= Battle of Ekeren =

1703 battle of the War of the Spanish Succession

- Part of the War of the Spanish Succession
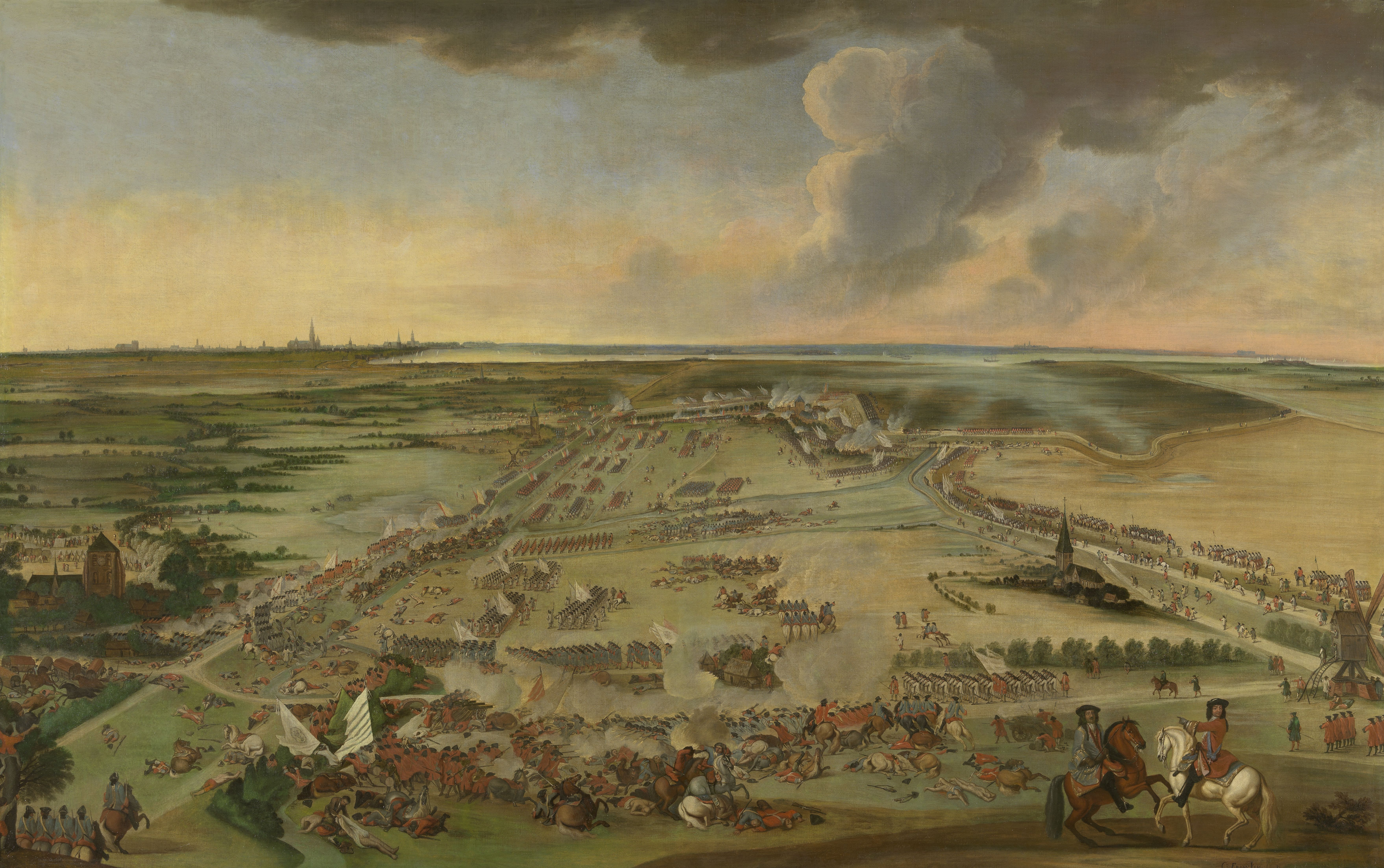
- Battle of Ekeren of 1703; Constantijn Francken, 1703
| Date | 30 June 1703 |
| Location | Ekeren, Antwerp, present-day Belgium; 51°16′14.00″N 4°24′27.00″E |
| Result | See Aftermath |

Belligerents
| Dutch Republic | France; Bourbon Spain; Cologne |

Commanders and leaders
| (Dutch Republic) Obdam (Dutch Republic) Slangenburg (Dutch Republic) C. Tilly (Dutch Republic) Fagel | (Kingdom of France) Boufflers (Kingdom of France) Guiscard (Spain) Bedmar (Spain) A. Tilly (Spain) Mérode-Westerloo |

Strength
| 12,000 (Note: Estimates for the number of Dutch troops range from 10,000 to 15,000, but are most often assumed to be around 12,000.) | 24,000 (Note: Estimates for number of men on the Franco-Spanish side varies more greatly. From John A. Lynn's estimate of 19,000 men, to Winston Churchill's estimate of 40,000 men. The Franco-Spanish commander Mérode-Westerloo himself thought that they were 3 times stronger than the Dutch. However, it is most commonly assumed that the Franco-Spanish force was around 2 times larger than the Dutch force.) |

Casualties and losses
| 1,700 killed or wounded 700 missing or: 2,500 killed or wounded, 800 captured | At least 2,234 killed or wounded (Note: Only the casualty numbers for part Franco-Spanish infantry is known. Numbers for the cavalry, grenadiers and the corps under Alberto Octavio Tserclaes de Tilly are missing. Wijn and Van Nimwegen write that Franco-Spanish losses were probably significantly higher than those of the Dutch.); 2,300 killed or wounded |

The Battle of Ekeren, which took place on 30 June 1703, was a battle of the War of the Spanish Succession. A Bourbon army of around 24,000 men, consisting of troops from France, Spain and Cologne, surrounded a smaller Dutch force of 12,000 men, which however managed to break out and retire to safety.

The battle had limited strategic effect, but, while showing the skill of the Dutch troops, it highlighted the disunity in the Anglo-Dutch command structure. Conflicts arose between various commanders, who all blamed each other for the near-disaster. In France Louis XIV was also displeased, as his superior force had let the Dutch escape.

== Background ==
The War of the Spanish Succession had commenced in the Netherlands in 1702 with the siege and capture of Kaiserswerth, and with the unsuccessful assault of the French army on Nijmegen. Marlborough took command of the combined Anglo-Dutch army on 1 July and he and Athlone, at the head of 60,000 men, went on the offensive by moving into the Spanish Netherlands. Like Frederick Henry in 1632, (Note: See Frederick Henry's Meuse campaign and the Capture of Maastricht) the Allied commanders followed the course of the river Meuse. The river was very important as a line of operation, because, due to the inadequacy of the land roads at that time, the possession of a river or a canal to transport an army's military necessities was not only advantageous, but almost necessary. The fortresses along the Meuse of Venlo, Stevensweert, Roermond and Liège succumbed to the Allies during this campaign.

The French and Spanish commanders observed the sieges of those cities idly. They had no other intention than to protect the regions of Brabant by means of an extensive entrenched line, which, passed over to the right bank of the Scheldt at Antwerp, and extended over Herentals, Aarschot, Diest and the Mehaigne near Huy to the Meuse. (See the map below)

== Prelude ==
In 1703 the campaign began with the siege of Bonn, which gave way to Menno van Coehoorn's attacks in the first half of May. After the fortress surrendered, Marlborough and the forces that had conducted the siege joined Ouwerkerk's army, which had been holding firm at Maastricht, to block Villeroy’s French army from advancing to relieve Bonn. The greater part of May and June continued with inconclusive movements on both sides, after which Marlborough decided to attack and break through the entrenched lines behind which the French army had withdrawn.

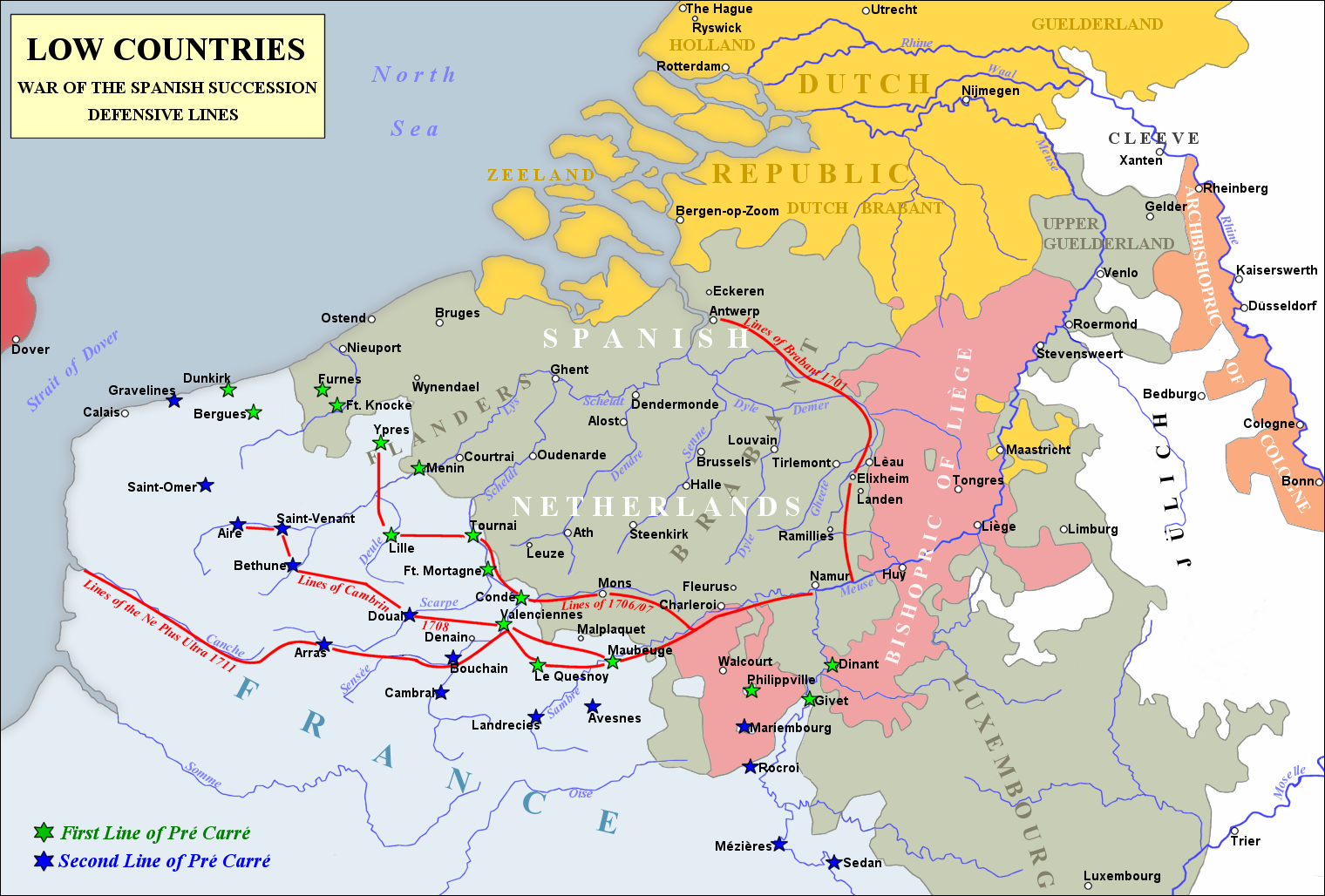
Map of the Low Countries during the War of the Spanish Succession; showing the Lines of Brabant.

Marlborough first proposed sieges of Ostend and Huy, but his plan was vetoed by the Dutch. (Note: Mainly because of opposition from Coehoorn, who would lead the siege of Ostend. He argued that it was too early in the season for an attack on Ostend and that Franco-Spanish reinforcements would easily bring an end to his siege of the city. In Marlborough's mind Coehoorn's attack on Ostend would just be a diversion for the siege of Huy. However, because his plan was not very clearly formulated, the generals effectively reasoned past each other. The Dutch States General was not unwilling to listen to Coehoorn because a conquest of Ostend did not align with Dutch commercial interests; conquering Ostend, thus establishing a beachhead on the North Sea coast, would provide the English with a direct (naval) connection to the Spanish Netherlands.) Instead Antwerp would be the main target. To capture that city Marlborough planned to pin down the French main force near Liège with the Allied main army of 55,000 men under himself and Ouwerkerk, thereby preventing the enemy from sending reinforcements to Antwerp. On the west bank of the Scheldt a division under generals Coehoorn and Sparre would attack the lines, opposite Dutch Flanders, and enclose Antwerp from the west side. Another division under general Count Wassenaer Obdam, had to enclose Antwerp via the other side of the Scheldt. If successful, the main army would then proceed to Antwerp as swiftly as possible, and start the siege of Antwerp.

Questions can be raised about this plan of attack as the two divisions under the Dutch generals were isolated from each other by the Scheldt and would not be able to come to each other's aid quickly in case of emergency. Additionally, the small divisions bore the heaviest burden, while the large Allied force was assigned only a demonstrative role. However, the greatest danger stemmed from the Franco-Spanish shorter internal lines, enabling their main army to reach Antwerp faster than the allied main force.

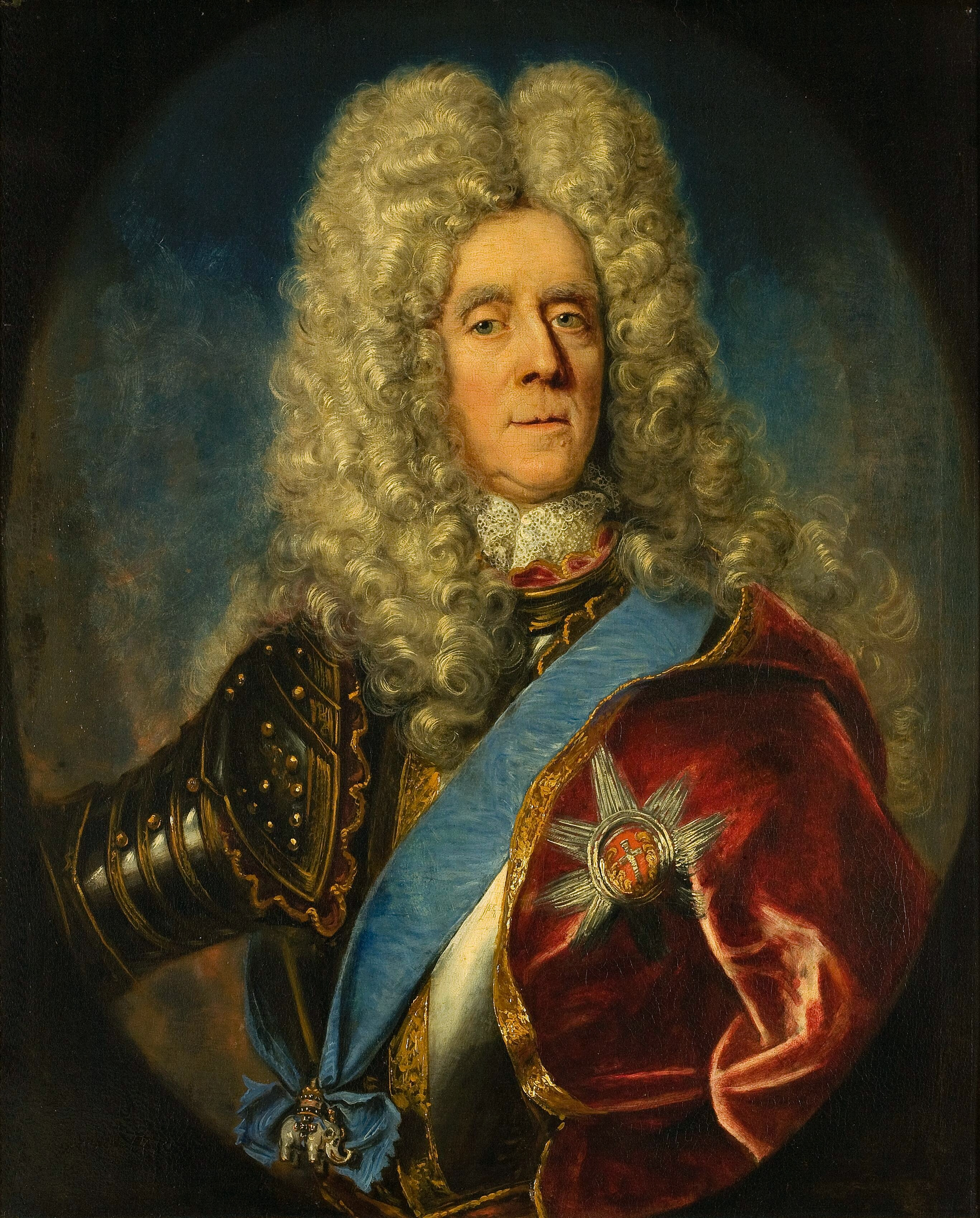
Jacob van Wassenaer Obdam

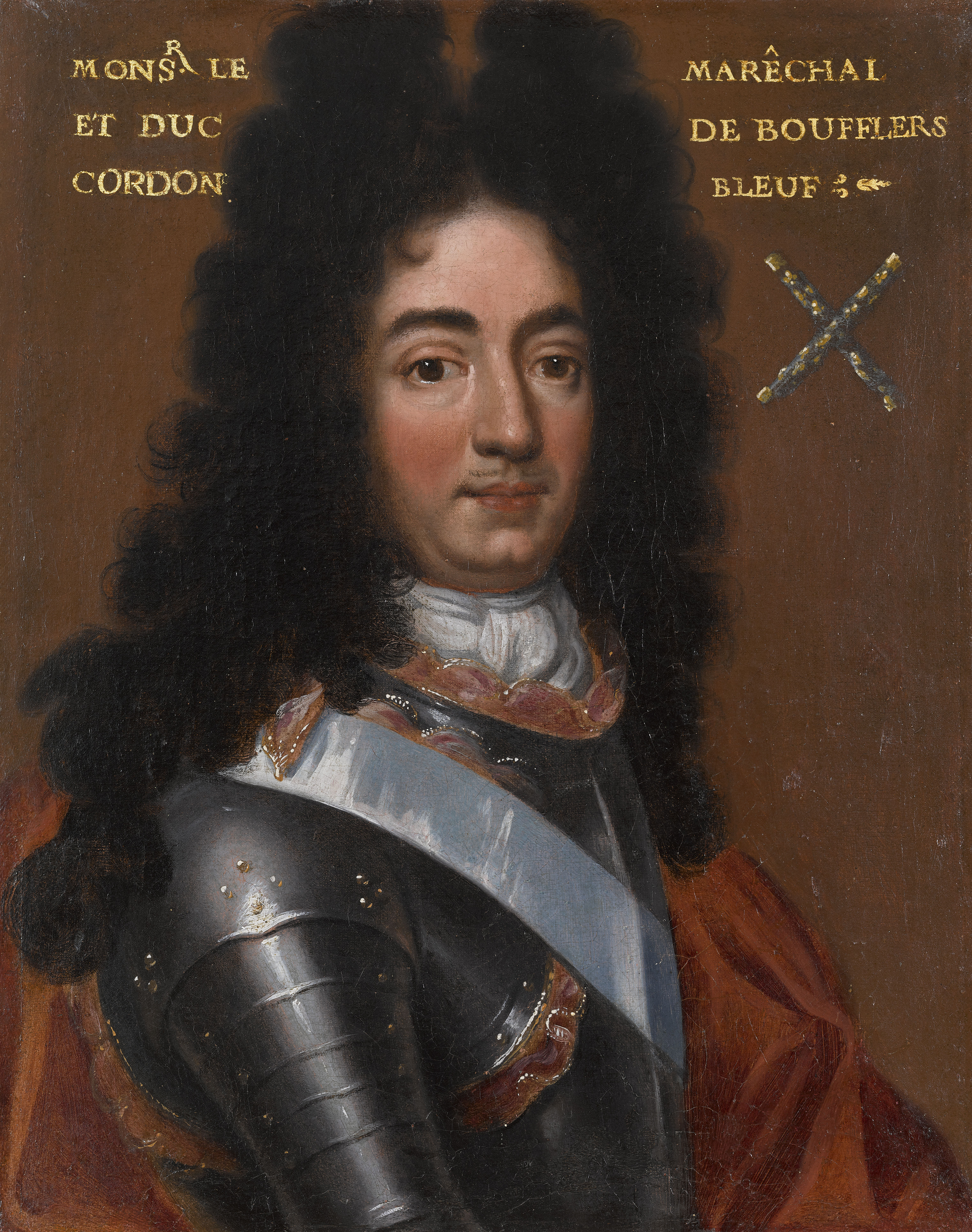
Louis-François de Boufflers

Upon Coehoorn's insistence, Obdam allocated a few of his battalions to the renowned engineer-general. Obdam's depleted force of 13 battalions and 26 squadrons, around 12,000 men, marched on 28 June from Bergen op Zoom to Antwerp and arrived the next day at Ekeren, seven kilometres north of Antwerp, just south of Dutch held Fort Lillo and one hour away from the French lines. Obdam's army had not remained blind to the danger it faced, and two of its sub-commanders, the Lord of Slangenburg and Count of Tilly, had stressed that danger to the head of the army. Obdam believed he should not act against the orders received and not abandon the position at Ekeren, but he reminded Marlborough of the precarious state of his division. Marlborough however ordered him to stay where he was.

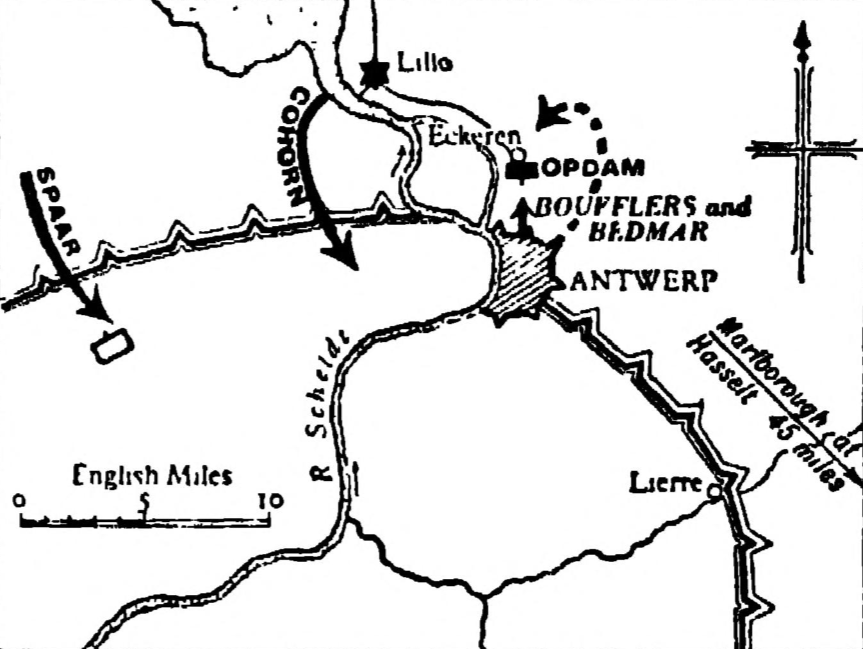
Map showing the movements of the various armies.

Had this situation lasted only a short while, and had the Anglo-Dutch forces been able to keep the enemy occupied elsewhere, the danger to Obdam would have been relatively minor. However, although Coehoorn and Sparre did attack and capture the Spanish lines at Stekene near Hulst on 27 June, the main army under Marlborough and Ouwerkerk started its diversion too early. By the end of June, the army had already stripped the area around Maastricht and Liège bare to supply itself and would therefore have to move elsewhere. They warned Obdam on 29 June that Villeroy had taken advantage of this to send Duke of Boufflers with part of the French army to link up with the Spanish near Antwerp, under the Marquis of Bedmar. Obdam moved the baggage to safety in time, but, as the French march was expected to take longer than it did, the positions which his army occupied were not yet abandoned when Boufflers arrived. After an exceptionally long march of 55 kilometers (34 miles), the 1,500 grenadiers and 30 squadrons of Boufflers already joined the 28 battalions and 19 squadrons of Bedmar at around midnight, growing the Franco-Spanish force Obdam now faced to some 24,000 men.

== Battle ==
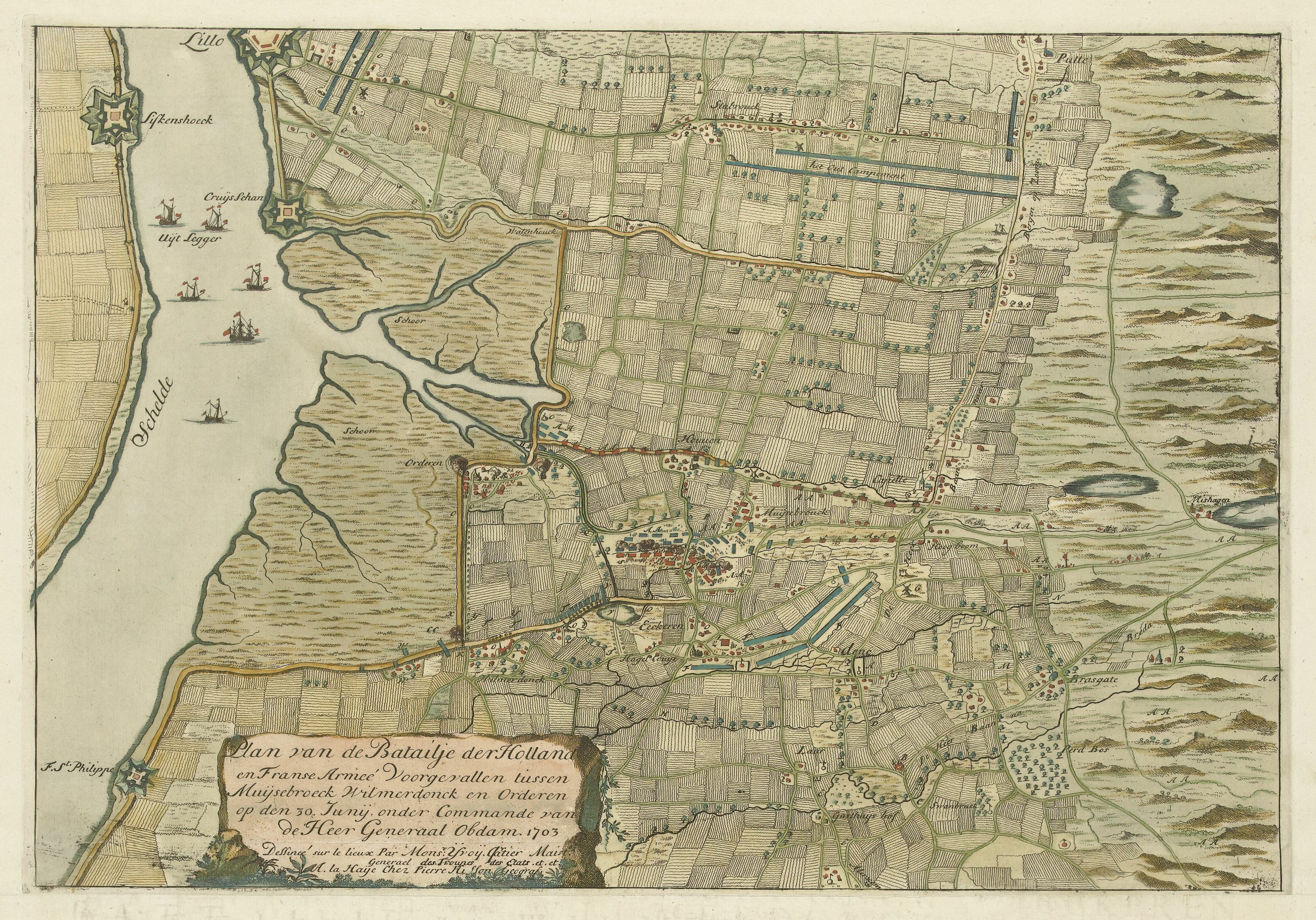
Contemporary Dutch map showing the battle. Fort Lillo is shown in the top left.

Early in the morning of 30 June the French dragoons of Louis de Guiscard marched from Merksem and Ekeren in the direction of Kapellen to cut off any potential escape route for the Dutch to Breda and Bergen-op-Zoom, while Bedmar and his Spanish troops were positioned near Wilmarsdonk. The Dutch forces were now surrounded, and severely outnumbered by two to one or more.

Soon Dutch reconnaissance discovered the French dragoons and Obdam immediately sent his cavalry to Hoevenen and Muisbroek, but it was too late, the villages were packed with French troops. They also found the French in great numbers in the village of Oorderen. Seeing the road through Oorderen as the only way to escape the encirclement, Obdam gave orders, at around 4 o'clock, to attack the village and the Dutch secured control of the village without much difficulty. Meanwhile in the polder, troops under Slangenburg, Tilly and François Nicolas Fagel engaged the Franco-Spanish troops in a struggle reminiscent of a rearguard action.

It was only now that the bulk of the Franco-Spanish infantry arrived on the battlefield. They were mainly sent to the polder where the Franco-Spanish attack gained new intensity. Supported by 10 pieces of artillery, they stormed the Dutch positions. However, the many ditches and hedges in the landscape eroded the cohesion of the attackers and the fighting evolved into isolated battles. Meanwhile, the Franco-Spanish cavalry remained largely inactive because the terrain hindered their usage. The engagement was long and bloody, but the Dutch lower commanders made up for the disparity in numbers by leaning on discipline, drill, and independent and quick thinking.

In the meantime, the French tried to retake Oorderen, but a first attempt was comfortably repulsed. After the arrival of fresh Franco-Spanish troops, another attempt was made. Here, too, the battle was long and fierce. Around 6 o'clock, Fagel sustained a head injury, which caused some confusion among his troops fighting in the polder. They pulled back which gave the French and Spanish the opportunity to throw more troops into the battle for Oorderen and the Dutch were finally driven out of the village. Mérode-Westerloo then led further attacks to break through to Wilmarsdonk, but these were repulsed by artillery fire from Colonel Verschuer. However, a charge by a detachment of French dragoons did manage to separate Obdam from his troops and after some time after 6 o'clock there was no more sign of him. He and his companions had removed the Allied green from their hats and their Orange sashes so that the French mistook them for their own countrymen. Thinking his army was destroyed, he then sent a letter reporting defeat to The Hague. Slangenburg, supported by Tilly, Fagel and Jacob Hop took over command.

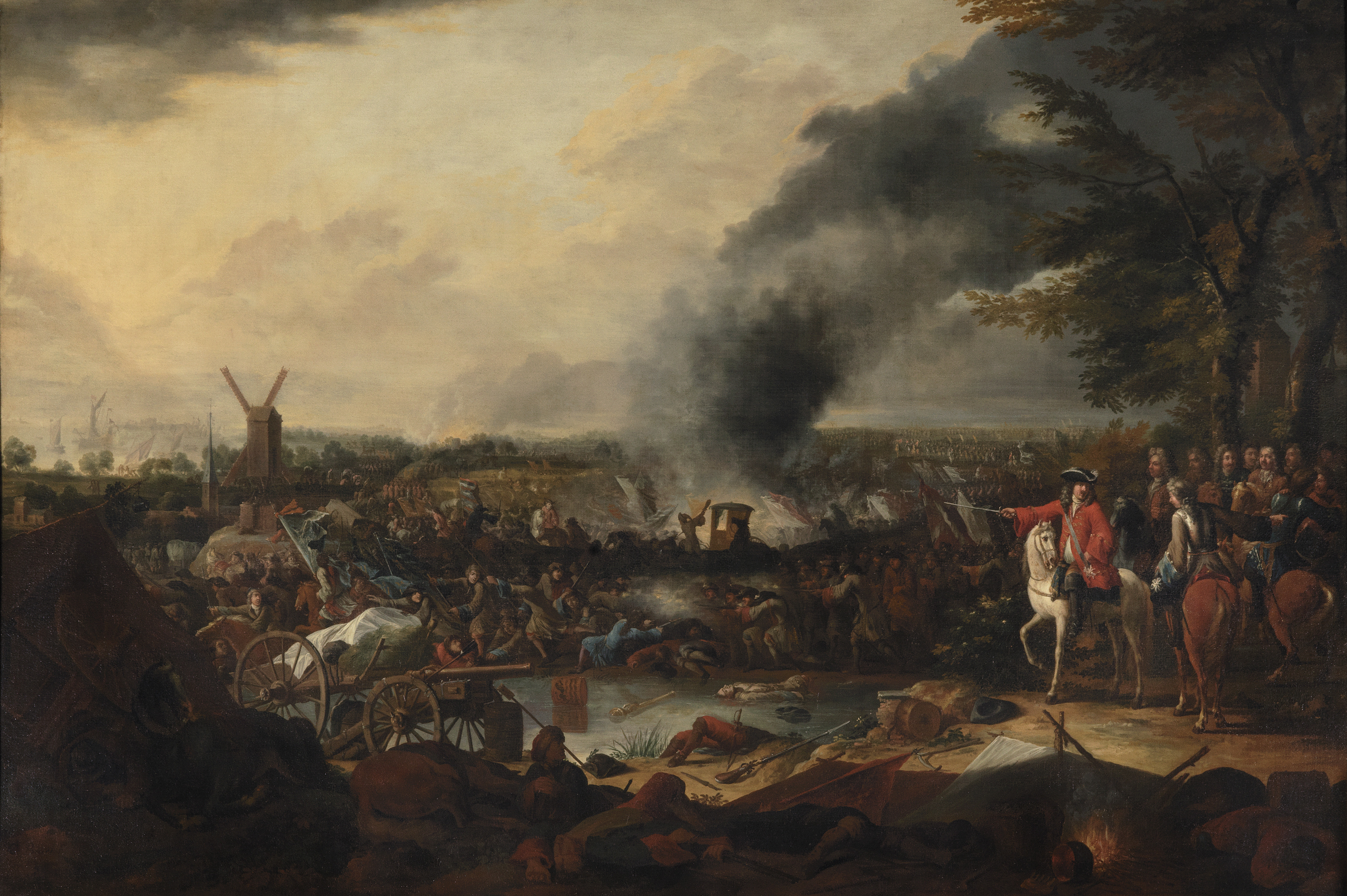
Battle of Ekeren, Jasper Broers

Around this time, some Dutch troops ran out of ammunition and Fagel ordered the soldiers to use the tin buttons of their uniform coats as bullets. It now became very urgent to break the encirclement. Tilly ordered an attack on some 1,500 Franco-Spanish cavalry crammed on a dyke to relieve the pressure on the Dutch troops in the polder. Hompesch gathered a number of cavalry squadrons and then charged at the Franco-Spanish cavalry. The Franco-Spanish cavalry broke and Hompesch pursued them for a distance of more than a kilometre. (Note: According to Spanish general Merode-Westerloo the French horsemen were drawn from their best regiments. He also writes that Hompesch charged at the head of only 40 caveliers. Chandler adopts these numbers from him, but they are in conflict with the accounts of Wijn and Van Nimwegen.) He then attacked the French infantry and managed to disperse some of their battalions, after which these French troops fled the battlefield in confusion. As a result the French in the polder pulled back. An attack by four fresh Spanish battalions from Antwerp approaching over the Scheldt embankment was subsequently repulsed. These successes created the opportunity to free up troops for a final assault on Oorderen, to force a breakthrough to safety. If this failed, the army would be lost.

Mérode-Westerloo commanded the Franco-Spanish troops in Oorderen, but the quality of his troops left much to be desired. Some had even dived into the cellars and came out drunk, while a lack of pioneers had prevented the village from being substantially fortified. Around 9 o'clock, the Dutch attack began. The Baron of Friesheim and the Count of Dohna sent their men wading through waist-deep water, with bayonets ready, on a flanking manoeuvre. They surprised the French and appeared on their flank and rear. The main Dutch force, clustered in a thick mass and followed by the cavalry, advanced over the Scheldt embankment from Wilmerdonk, and stormed Oorderen from that side. Here too the fighting was long and hard, but after 10 o'clock Mérode-Westerloo was forced to retreat. The French still held out at a sluice behind the village, where they had entrenched themselves; but this post was also overwhelmed. The Dutch now occupied the village and the encirclement was broken. The Dutch army spent the night at Oorderen, where it was reinforced by a few battalions that Coehoorn had sent to their aid from the other side of the Scheldt. At dawn of the following day, the march was continued to Lillo, where they arrived unhindered, without any French attempts to prevent their retreat.

The Duke of Berwick, one of the French generals, wrote:

... most of our men, believing they had lost the battle, withdrew to the heathland during the darkness, close to the cavalry which had remained there. When daylight came, they went out to scout; and when they saw that the enemies had completely withdrawn, they ordered the troops to return to the battlefield with many drums, timpani and trumpets.

== Aftermath ==
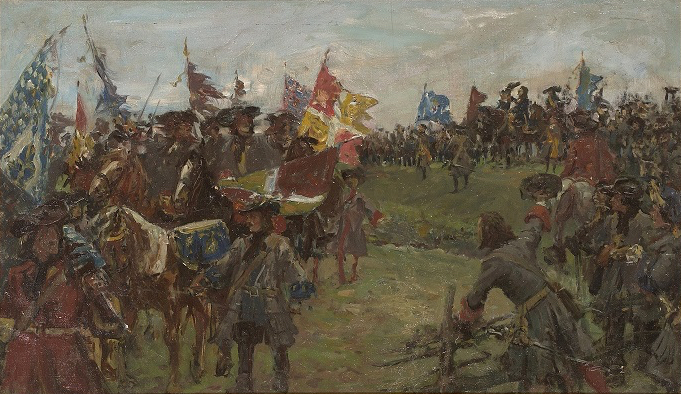
Parade of Dutch soldiers with captured French and Bavarian banners after the battle of Ekeren, by Jan Hoynck van Papendrecht.

The battle had no clear victor, but both sides claimed victory. The Dutch because they had forced the French from the battlefield, allowing them to retire to safety and the French and Spanish because they occupied the battlefield the next day. Both parties also appealed to outward signs of victory such as captured banners and standards. The strategic situation remained largely unchanged. The Dutch pulled back several kilometres, occupying a tactically more favourable position, and Boufflers' detachment returned, as if nothing had happened, to the French main army. While the failure to encircle Antwerp was an Allied setback, chances of success for the Allied plans had not significantly decreased. Both before and after the battle, everything depended on the actions of the main armies under Marlborough and Villeroy.

Boufflers was blamed for letting a perfect chance to destroy a large enemy division slip through his fingers. He argued that the limited success of the French forces in this otherwise well-designed and initially promising undertaking was caused by the quality of Bedmar's infantry regiments. Alongside battalions that performed their duties to the best of their ability, there were others whose combat value was less than mediocre. However, Louis XIV became so displeased with Boufflers during the campaign that he did not allow him to lead a force in the open field anymore, except for the year of 1709. Mérode-Westerloo, Flemish general in Spanish service, would later blame a lack of support and 'French foolhardiness' for the ultimate loss of Oorderen. (Note: Mérode-Westerloo wrote in his memoir: We lost more than 2,000 killed and wounded, although, in fact, we might have made the entire Dutch army prisoners of war for a loss of less than a hundred had we only occupied the line of the dykes and then pounded them to pieces with cannon fire or starved them into surrender. But French foolhardiness and I don’t know what besides made us muff the opportunity, and all we gained from it was what the foe cared to leave on the field of battle. Indeed, it was only next morning that we truly knew that they were not still in position, and set out to seek what they had forgotten to take with them. And so, two days later, they fired a salvo from all their forts [claiming a victory] with more justice than ourselves.)

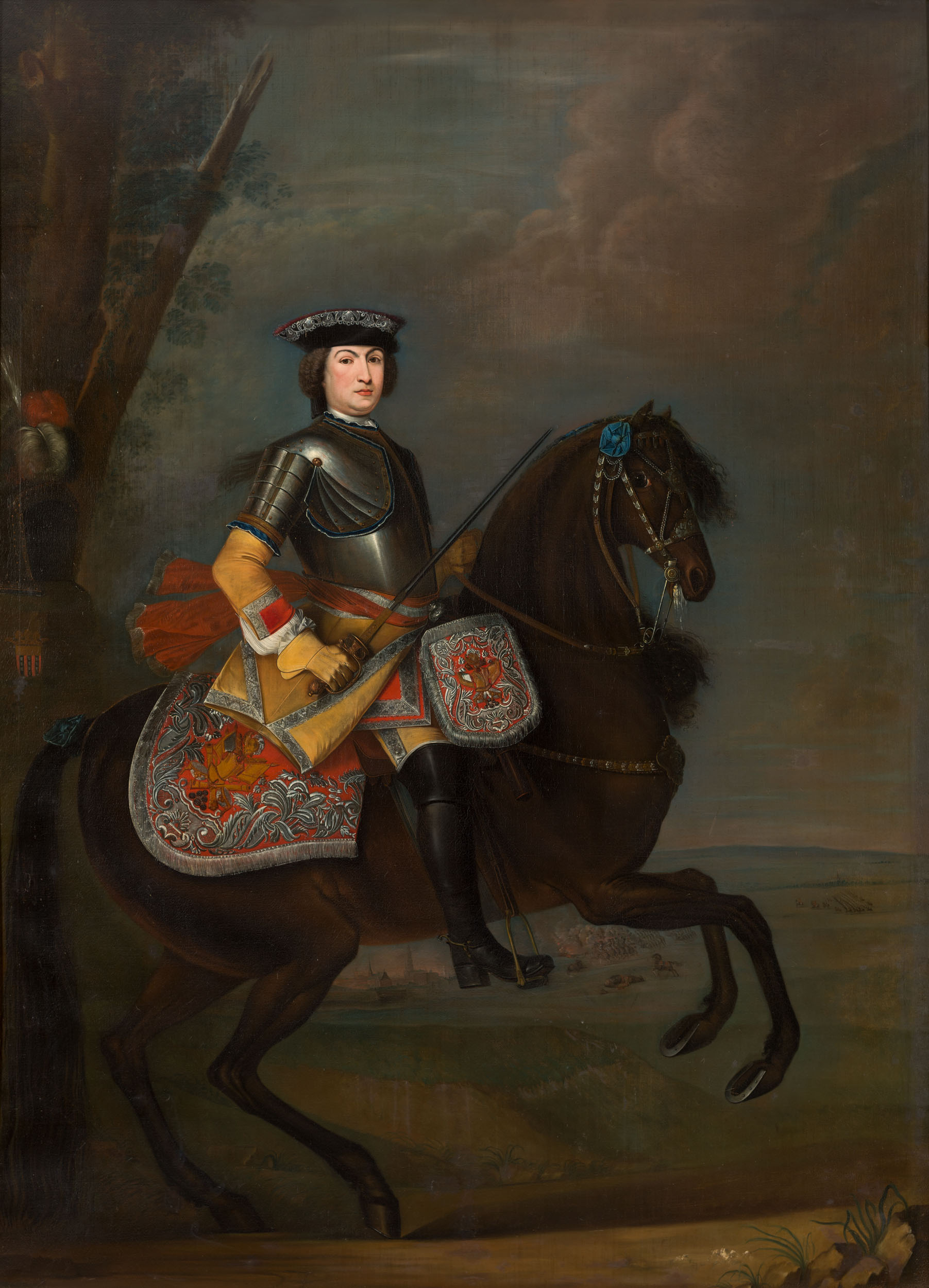
Portrait of a Dutch cavalry officer, with Ekeren in the background.

Obdam had panicked in the afternoon and had managed to get through the enemy line with a handful of riders. The States of Holland, after a careful investigation, declared that they had found that he was not at fault, but the incident ruined his military career. Slangenburg, for his part, was acclaimed as a Dutch hero. He had always been known as a difficult character, but with his newfound fame he was even less inclined to keep quiet. He refrained from supporting rehabilitation for Obdam, got into open conflict with other Dutch commanders and was also furious at Marlborough, who he accused of allowing them to fall into a trap he had warned Marlborough about. This difficult relationship with his peers would eventually lead to his dismissal in 1705. (Note: Thomas Lediard remarked that Slangenburg lost by his tongue what he had gained by his sword.)

Nevertheless, the Dutch officers and men had shown their best side while the French and Spanish troops, despite their superiority, had been unable to hold out. The Dutch infantry had once again proved why it was often considered to be the best in Europe. Boufflers wrote that the Dutch had very-exercised troops whose strength is to fire well, which they certainly do to perfection and with a marvelous order. But it was the performance of the Dutch cavalry that most impressed contemporaries. Chaplain of the Royal Scots, Samuel Noyes, wrote: The Dutch Horse has done wonders against the troops of the French household and [the French] begin to despise them as much as they were formerly despised by others. They had shown that they were no longer inferior to the French and Spanish cavalry.

Obdam's conduct was widely criticised, but in England the battle was presented by most as a Dutch success. Marlborough described the battle as one of the most magnificent exploits of the era, but did not share the delight of his countrymen. He was criticised because of the incident, and although Huy, Limbourg and Geldern fell into Allied hands in the months following Ekeren, Marlborough failed to bring Villeroy to battle. He feared that the lack of decisive success in the Low Countries would deter the Dutch from sending troops to Germany, where the Holy Roman Emperor was in an increasingly dire military situation.

== Technological developments ==
Bayonets played a major role in the battle. Originally a simple dagger inserted into the musket barrel, the bayonet was revolutionised by Vauban with the invention of the socket bayonet, which fitted around the barrel by means of a ring. This allowed infantrymen to continue firing while engaging in close combat. As a result, early 18th century soldiers possessed a more versatile and reliable weapon than earlier musketeers, combining firepower with a melee capability and reducing their vulnerability to cavalry. This improvement reduced the reliance on pikes. For the French infantry Ekeren marked the last recorded occasion on which they used pikes. The Dutch would not fully abolish the pike until 1708, after the Battle of Wijnendale.

== Gallery ==
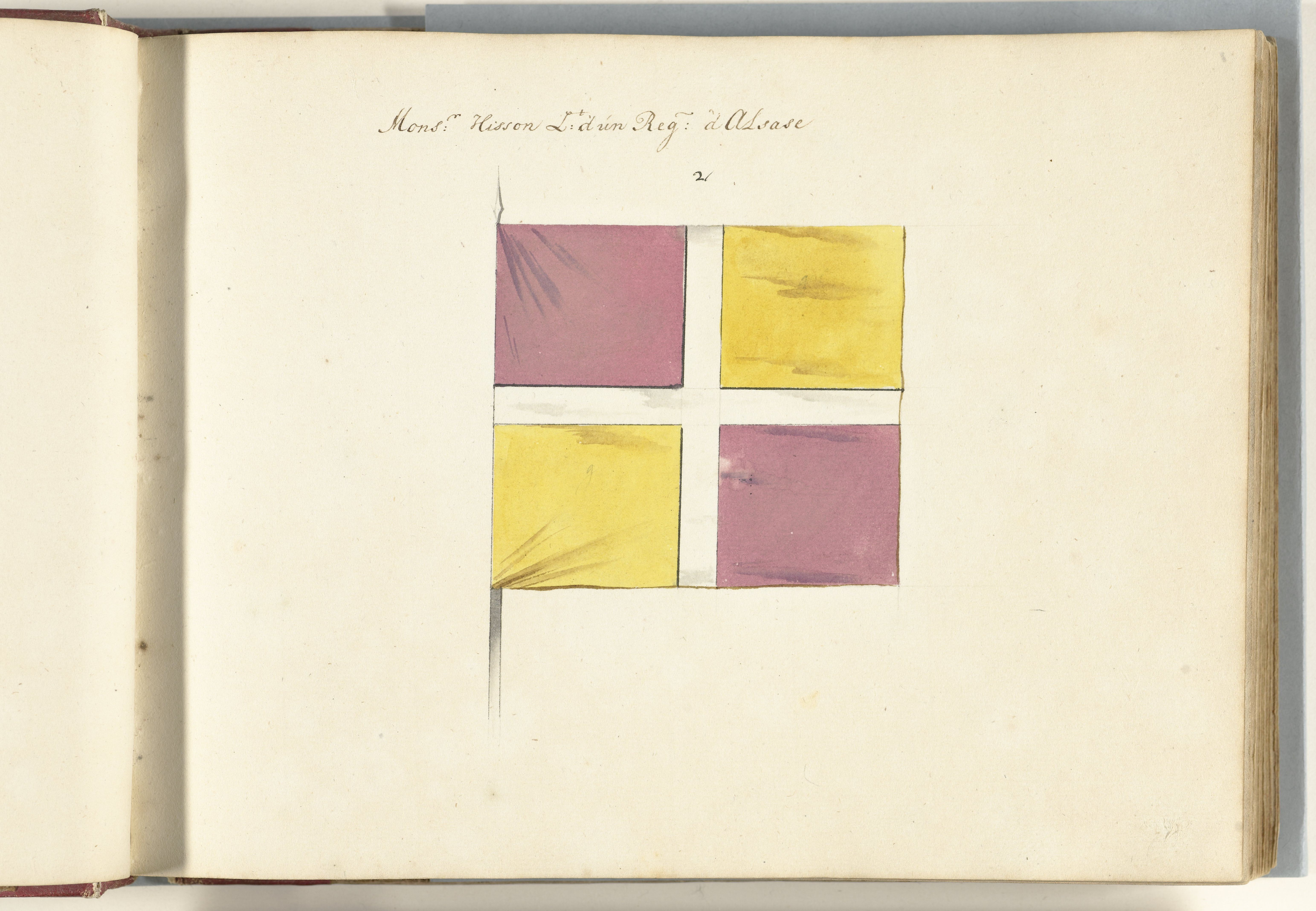
Drawing of a standard from the French Régiment d'Alsace, captured at the battle of Ekeren.

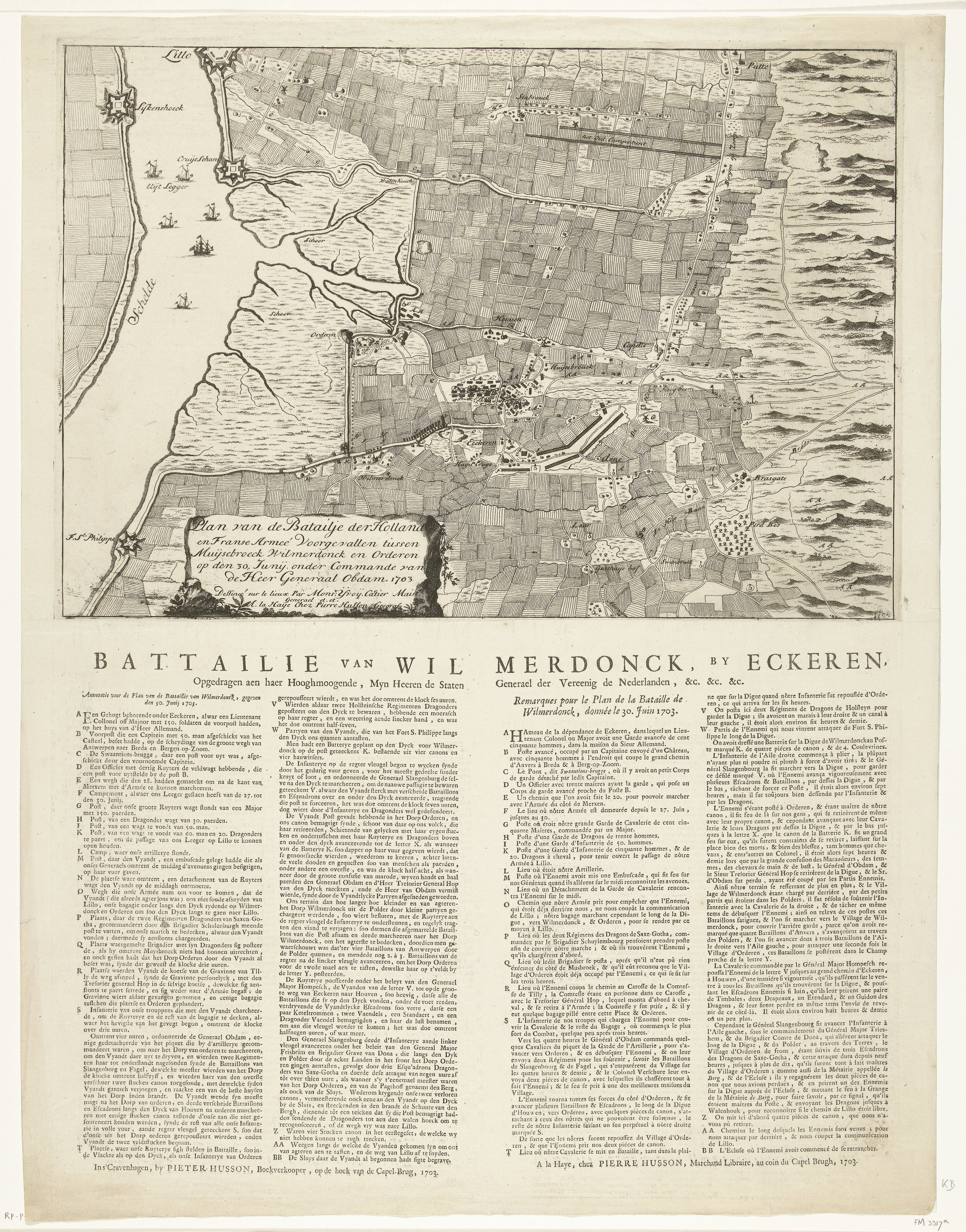
Dutch map and description of the Battle of Ekeren, produced in 1703

== Sources ==
- Van Alphen, Marc; Hoffenaar, Jan; Lemmers, Alan; Van der Spek, Christiaan (2019). Krijgsmacht en Handelsgeest: Om het machtsevenwicht in Europa (in Dutch). Boom. ISBN 978-90-244-3038-3.
- Bodart, Gaston (1908). Militär-historisches Kriegs-Lexikon (1618–1905) (in German).
- Bottema, J.K.H.L (1972). "Ekeren 30 juni 1703". Mars et Historia. 7 (4): 73–81.
- Bromley, J. S. (1970). The Rise of Great Britain and Russia, 1688–1715/25. Cambridge: University Press. ISBN 978-0521075244.
- Chandler, David (1976). The art of warfare in the age of Marlborough. Hippocrene Books. ISBN 978-0-88254-366-6.
  - Parker, Robert; de Merode-Westerloo, Jean Philippe Eugene (1998). Chandler, David (ed.). Military memoirs of Marlborough's campaigns, 1702-1712. Greenhill Books. ISBN 978-1-85367-330-6.
- Churchill, Winston (1936). Marlborough: His Life and Times. George G. Harrap Co. Ltd London.
- Coombs, Douglas (1958). The Conduct of the Dutch: British Opinion and the Dutch Alliance During the War of the Spanish Succession. Springer Dordrecht. ISBN 978-94-015-0359-4.
- Gietman, Conrad (2006). "Frederik Johan van Baer". Biografisch Woordenboek Gelderland, deel 5, Bekende en onbekende mannen en vrouwen uit de Gelderse geschiedenis (in Dutch).
- Johnston, S. H. F. (1959). "Letters of Samuel Noyes, Chaplain of the Royal Scotts, 1703–4". Journal of the Society for Army Historical Research. 37 (149): 33–40.
- Knoop, Willem Jan (1861a). "Coehoorn". De Gids (in Dutch). 25.
  - Knoop, Willem Jan (1861b). Krijgs – en geschiedkundige geschriften. Deel 1 [Military and historical writings. Volume 1] (in Dutch). H. A. M. Roelants.
- Van Lennep, Jacob (1880). De geschiedenis van Nederland, aan het Nederlandsche Volk verteld [The history of the Netherlands, told to the Dutch nation] (in Dutch). Leiden; z.j.
- Lynn, John A. (1999). The Wars of Louis XIV: 1667–1714. Longman. ISBN 0-582-05629-2.
- Marchal, Felix Paul Nicholas (1872). Abrégé des guerres du régne de Louis XIV précédé d'une notice historique: conférences donnees au régiment des carabiniers [Summary of the wars of the reign of Louis XIV preceded by a historical note: lectures given to the Carabineers Regiment] (in French). Fonteyn.
- Van Nimwegen, Olaf (2020). De Veertigjarige Oorlog 1672–1712 (in Dutch). Prometheus. ISBN 978-90-446-3871-4.
  - Nimwegen, Olaf van (1995). De subsistentie van het leger: Logistiek en strategie van het Geallieerde en met name het Staatse leger tijdens de Spaanse Successieoorlog in de Nederlanden en het Heilige Roomse Rijk (1701-1712) [The subsistence of the Allied and especially the Dutch army during the War of the Spanish Succession] (Thesis) (in Dutch). Universiteit Utrecht.
- Oury, Clément (2022). Le Duc de Marlborough: John Churchill, le plus redoutable ennemi de Louis XIV [The Duke of Marlborough: John Churchill, Louis XIV's Most Formidable Enemy] (in French). Perrin. ISBN 978-2262086145.
- Pelet-Clozeau, Jean-Jacques Germain; Vault, François-Eugène de (1835). Mémoires militaires relatifs à la succession d'Espagne sous Louis XIV: extraits de la correspondance de la Cour et des généraux. Tome 3 [Military Memoirs Relating to the Spanish Succession under Louis XIV: Extracts from the Correspondence of the Court and the Generals. Volume 3] (in French). Imprimerie nationale.
- De Vryer, Abraham (1738). Histori van Joan Churchill, hertog van Marlborough en prins van Mindelheim (in Dutch). Loveringh en De Jonge.
- Wijn, J.W. (1956). Het Staatsche Leger: Deel VIII-1 Het tijdperk van de Spaanse Successieoorlog 1702–1705 (The Dutch States Army: Part VIII-1 The era of the War of the Spanish Succession 1702–1705) (in Dutch). Martinus Nijhoff.
  - Wijn, J.W. (1959). Het Staatsche Leger: Deel VIII-2 Het tijdperk van de Spaanse Successieoorlog 1706–1710 (The Dutch States Army: Part VIII-2 The era of the War of the Spanish Succession 1706–1710) (in Dutch). Martinus Nijhoff.
