= Oorderen =

Village in Belgium

Coordinates: 51°17′N 4°22′E

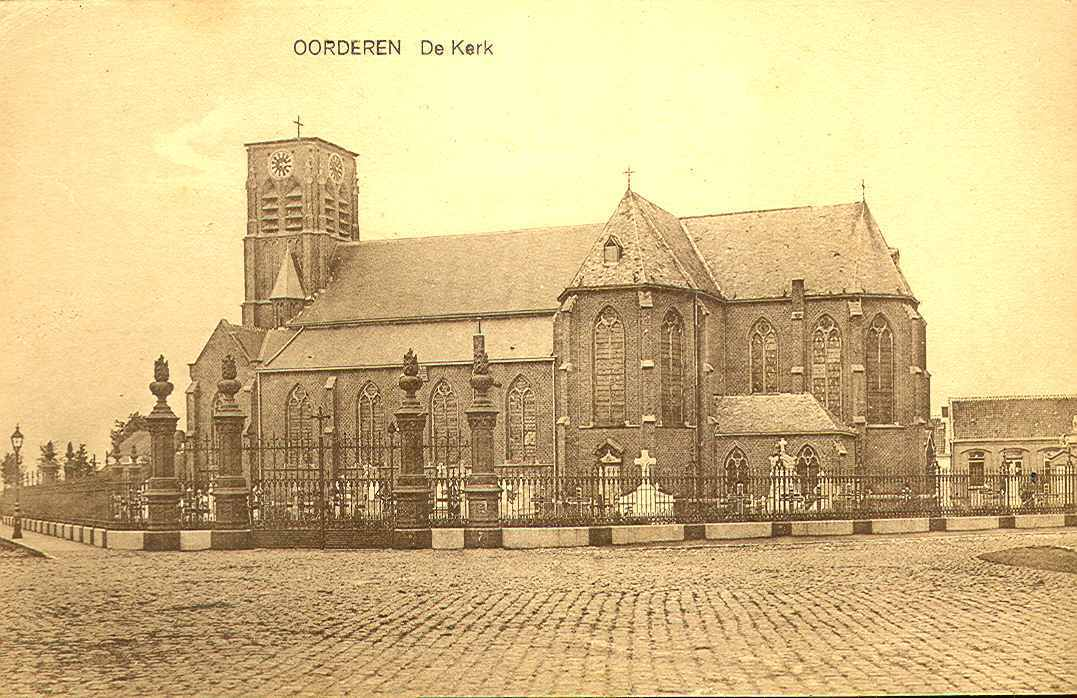
The church of Oorderen prior to the demolition in 1966.

Oorderen was a small Belgian village near the city of Antwerp until 1965. It was demolished because of the extension of the Port of Antwerp.

The village was first mentioned in 1116 and merged into the city of Antwerp in 1927.

In its place came Plant 2 of General Motors, later Opel Antwerp, now defunct.

Another part of the village was taken by the railroad yard Antwerp-North and railway station Antwerp-Harbour.

Other villages that were taken by the harbor of Antwerp are Wilmarsdonk, Oosterweel and Lillo
