= Battle of Stekene =

Part of the War of the Spanish Succession (1703)

- Part of the War of the Spanish Succession
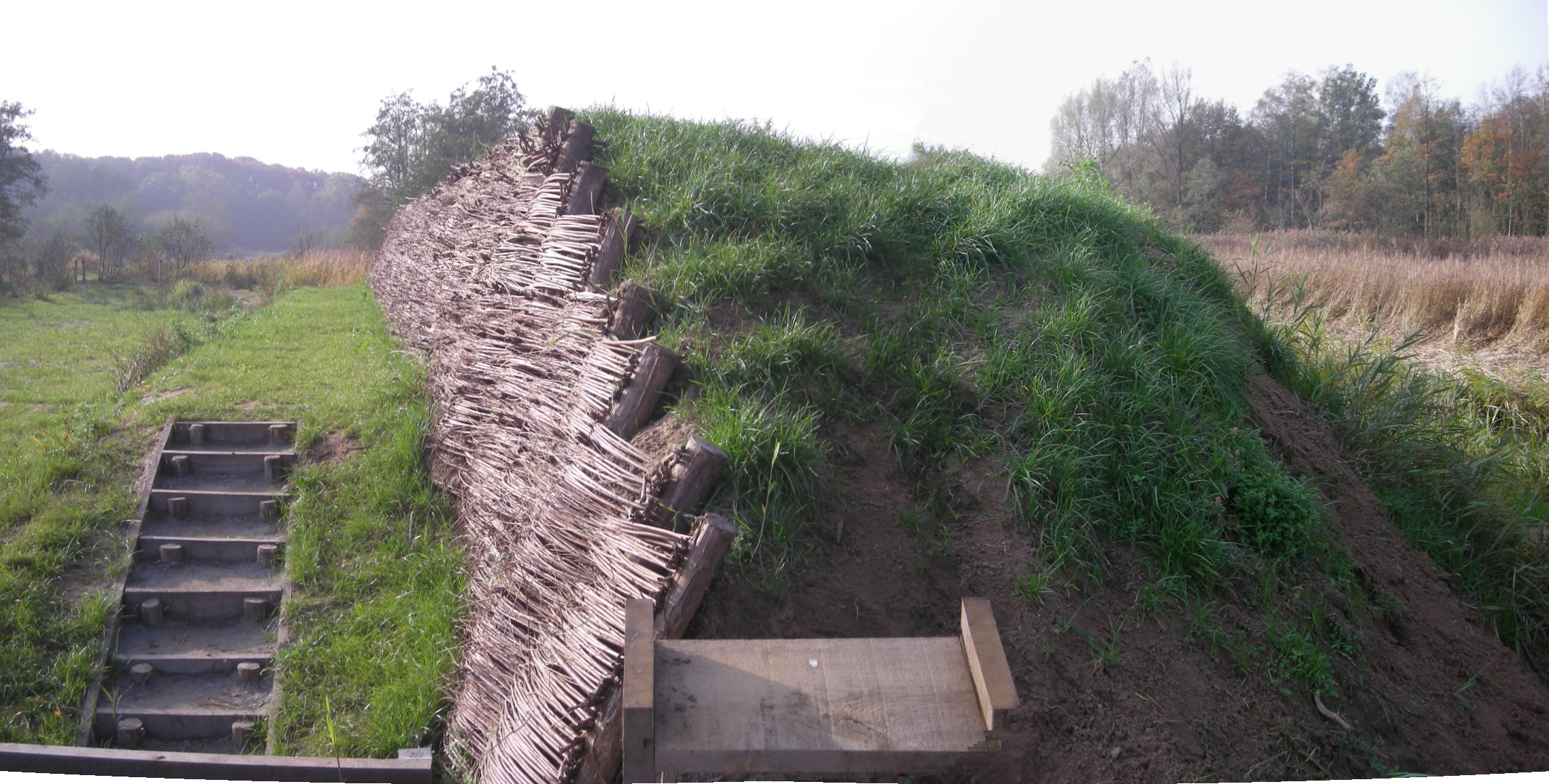
Date	27 June 1703
Location	Stekene, Spanish Netherlands, present-day Belgium
Result	Dutch victory

Belligerents
Dutch Republic	France; Bourbon Spain

Commanders and leaders
(Dutch Republic) Karel Willem Sparre	(Kingdom of France) Charles la Mothe

Strength
7,000	French soldiers: 2,500; Local farmers: 1,500–6,000

Casualties and losses
900–1,300 killed or wounded	700 killed or wounded 330 captured (Note: 280 of the 330 captured were farmers)

The Battle of Stekene took place on 27 June 1703, during the War of the Spanish Succession, when a Dutch force of 7,000 men, under Karel Willem Sparre, attacked the Franco-Spanish defensive that ran from Ostend to Antwerp. The lines at Stekene were defended by 2,500 French soldiers under La Mothe and 1,500 to 6,000 local Flemish farmers. After a 3-hour long battle, the French abandoned their posts, which allowed the Dutch to capture the defensive works. The Dutch then attacked and captured the village of Stekene itself where the local farmers fiercely resisted.

== Prelude ==
The War of the Spanish Succession had commenced in the Netherlands in 1702 with the siege and capture of Kaiserswerth, and with the unsuccessful assault of the French army on Nijmegen. Marlborough, later seeing himself at the head of 60,000 men, took advantage of this strong force by going on the offensive and penetrating into the Spanish Netherlands. The fortresses along the Meuse of Venlo, Stevensweert, Roermond and Liège succumbed to the Allies during this campaign.

The French commanders observed the sieges of those cities idly. They had no other intention than to protect the regions of Brabant by means of an extensive entrenched line, which, passed over to the right bank of the Scheldt at Antwerp, and extended over Herentals, Aarschot, Diest and the Mehaigne near Huy to the Meuse.

In 1703 the campaign began with the siege of Bonn, which gave way to Menno van Coehoorn's attacks in the first half of May. After the surrender of that fortress, Marlborough and the army under Coehoorn that had conducted the siege joined the army with which Ouwerkerk had repulsed Villeroy at Maastricht, for the purpose of preventing him from advancing to the aid of Bonn. The greater part of May and June continued with inconclusive movements on both side, after which Marlborough decided to attack and break through the entrenched lines behind which the French army had withdrawn.

Marlborough proposed sieges of Ostend and Huy to draw French forces away from the vital centre of Antwerp, but his plan was vetoed by the Dutch. Instead Marlborough now planned to break through the lines near Diest with the main army of 55,000 men under himself and Ouwerkerk, while on the left bank of the Scheldt a division under generals Coehoorn and Karel Willem Sparre would attack the lines, opposite Dutch Flanders. Another division under general Count Wassenaer Obdam, had to enclose Antwerp via the other side of the Scheldt, and to that end advance to the village of Ekeren.

== Attack on the lines ==
On the 27th of June, Coehoorn and Sparre undertook a maneuver towards the French lines. Coehoorn directed an assault near Kallo, and his forces, without much difficulty or the loss of many troops, managed to secure a redoubt and break through the lines.

While these events unfolded near the Scheldt, Sparre executed a maneuver between Sluis and Sas van Gent. This maneuver aimed to mislead the French Count of La Motte, who was closely observing Sparre's actions. To achieve this, Sparre set out towards Bruges on the morning of the twenty-sixth, creating the appearance of an intention to inspect the lines there. However, in the evening, he abruptly altered his course, redirecting his forces towards the Land of Waas. This tactical shift led them to the vicinity of the enemy's entrenched positions at a village named Stekene. In this area, seven battalions of foot soldiers and a few thousand peasants were stationed to guard the lines. Sparre, despite the presence of this opposition, thought this was the best place for an attack.

In the morning, around four o'clock, Dutch artillery opened fire. This was mainly aimed at destroying the palisades. Much damage to the earthworks themselves or the morale of the defenders was probably not caused. Sparre arranged his troops in proper formation and rallied them with a speech. Between six and seven in the morning, the attack against the French lines commenced. These particular lines were guarded by a small flowing river rather than a moat. In front went the grenadiers and pioneers, who filled the river with fascines and did the initial work with hand grenades. They were followed by the rest of the infantry in three columns. Sparre himself led the centre, Lauder the right, and Vassy the left. Despite the exposure to enemy fire, the Dutch forces filled the river, creating a passage. They engaged in direct combat with the defenders, persisting through their resistance. After a protracted and intense confrontation, the defenders eventually retreated, leaving the defensive line open for the Allies.

This undertaking, among the more costly of the conflict, incurred a toll of around 1,100 casualties for the Dutch, encompassing both fatalities and injuries. A significant portion of these losses transpired as the intensity of the battle already waned. This was because the farmers had opened a heavy fire on Sparre's army from the houses in the village of Stekene. These peasants held their ground tenaciously, prompting General Sparre to deviate from the customary rules of war. He ordered his troops to show no quarter, insisting that those who resisted be met with the blade, aiming to dissuade further enemy resistance.

== Aftermath ==
Why, after achieving this victory, Coehoorn and Sparre did not turn to the west side of Antwerp, to enclose that city and also to come into direct contact with the force under Obdam, which had approached Antwerp on the right bank of the Scheldt, remains a question. Instead, the divisions of Coehoorn and Sparre, after having scored a victory, remained idle in the Land of Waas.

The other armies met little success. The main army under Marlborough and Ouwerkerk started its manoeuvre too early. By the end of June, the army had already stripped the area around Maastricht and Liège bare and would therefore have to move elsewhere. Obdam's army, positioned on the other side of Antwerp near Ekeren, only nearly escaped destruction after being attacked by a French detachment under Louis-François de Boufflers.

Although Huy, Limbourg and Geldern fell into Allied hands in the months following Stekene and Ekeren, Marlborough failed to bring Villeroy's main army to battle. He feared that the lack of decisive success in the Low Countries would deter the Dutch from sending troops to Germany, where the Holy Roman Emperor was in an increasingly dire military situation.

== Sources ==
- Van Lennep, Jacob (1880). De geschiedenis van Nederland, aan het Nederlandsche Volk verteld [The history of the Netherlands, told to the Dutch nation] (in Dutch). Leiden; z.j.
- De Vryer, Abraham (1738). Histori van Joan Churchill, hertog van Marlborough en prins van Mindelheim (in Dutch). Loveringh en De Jonge.
- Bodart, Gaston (1908). Militär-historisches Kriegs-Lexikon (1618–1905).
- Knoop, Willem Jan (1861b). Krijgs – en geschiedkundige geschriften. Deel 1 [Martial and historical writings. Volume 1] (in Dutch). H. A. M. Roelants.
- Van Nimwegen, Olaf (2020). De Veertigjarige Oorlog 1672–1712 (in Dutch). Prometheus. ISBN 978-90-446-3871-4.
- Lynn, John A. (1999). The Wars of Louis XIV: 1667–1714. Longman. ISBN 0-582-05629-2.
- Knoop, Willem Jan (1861). "Coehoorn". De Gids (in Dutch). 25.
- Coombs, Douglas (1958). The Conduct of the Dutch: British Opinion and the Dutch Alliance During the War of the Spanish Succession. Springer Dordrecht. ISBN 978-94-015-0359-4.
- Wijn, J.W. (1956). Het Staatsche Leger: Deel VIII-1 Het tijdperk van de Spaanse Successieoorlog 1702–1705 (The Dutch States Army: Part VIII-1 The era of the War of the Spanish Succession 1702–1705) (in Dutch). Martinus Nijhoff.
