= Unico Wilhelm van Wassenaer =

Dutch noble, diplomat and composer (1692–1766)

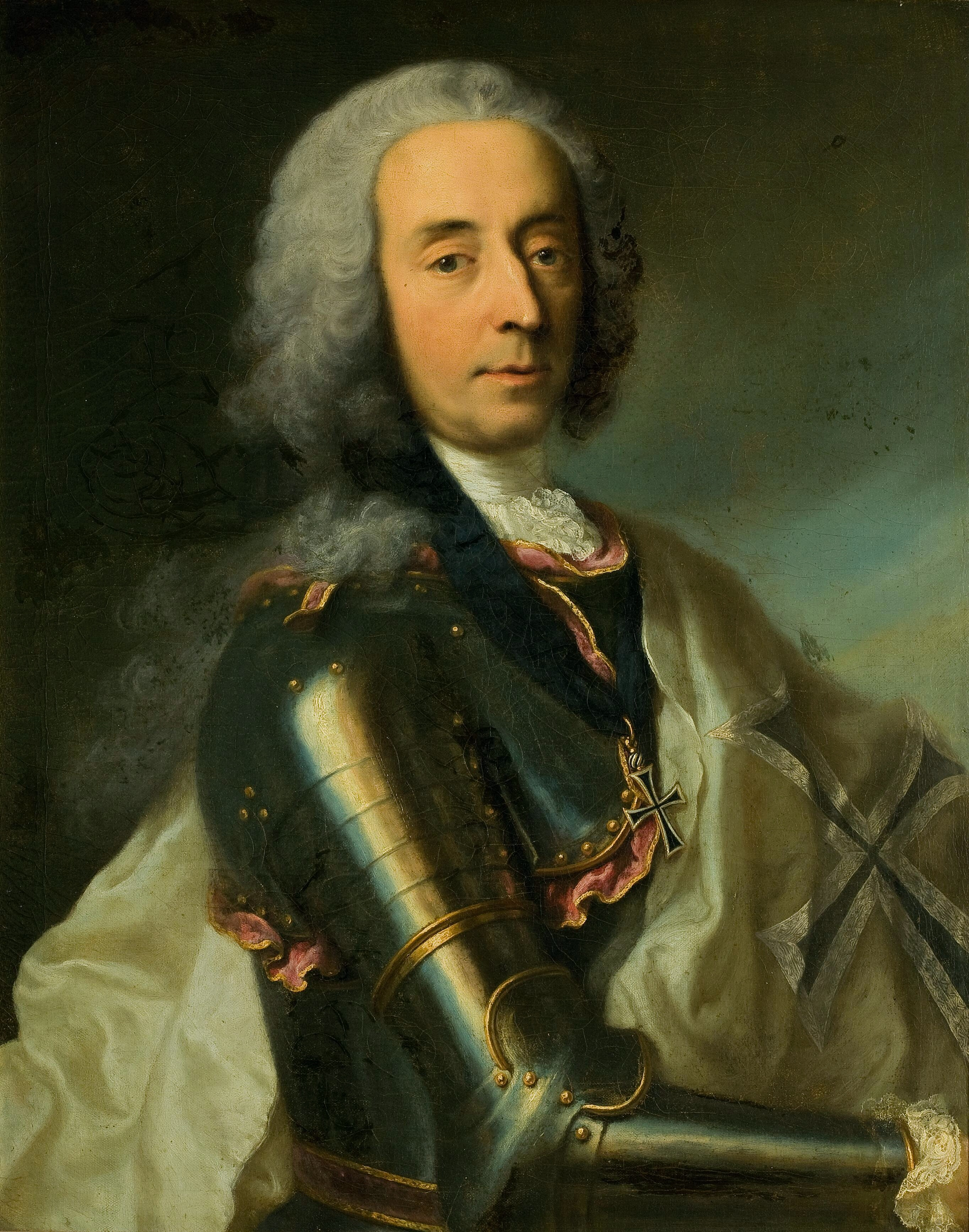
- Portrait by Georg Desmarées
- Born: 30 October 1692; Delden, Netherlands
- Died: 9 November 1766 (aged 74); The Hague, Netherlands
- Occupations: Diplomat, composer, and administrator
- Known for: Concerti Armonici

Unico Wilhelm, Count van Wassenaer Obdam (30 October 1692 – 9 November 1766) was a Dutch nobleman who was a diplomat as well as a composer. He reorganized the Bailiwick of Utrecht of the Teutonic Order. His most important surviving compositions are the Concerti Armonici, which until 1980 had been misattributed to the Italian composer Giovanni Battista Pergolesi (1710–1736) and to Carlo Ricciotti (1681–1756).

== Early years ==
Van Wassenaer was born into a distinguished family of wealth, power and accomplishment—the House of Wassenaer. His grandfather, Jacob van Wassenaer Obdam, was supreme commander of the confederate Dutch navy, and was killed in battle in 1665 in the Second Anglo-Dutch War; his father, Jacob van Wassenaer Obdam (younger), served as a general of the army in the War of the Spanish Succession, but ruined his military reputation in 1703 in the Battle of Ekeren, and spent the rest of his career as a diplomat.

Unico Wilhelm van Wassenaer was born in the family castle of Twickel, near Delden, on 30 October 1692, the son of Jacob van Wassenaer Obdam (1645–1714) and Adriana Sophia Raesfelt (died 1694). He grew up in the Hague, where he was taught to play the harpsichord and violin. In 1707-09 he stayed with his father and three sisters in Düsseldorf at the court of Johann Wilhelm, Elector Palatine. The strong Italian influences at the court had a major influence on his musical development. On 18 September 1710 Unico Wilhelm was admitted to the University of Leiden to study law. In December 1711 he interrupted his studies to go to Frankfurt for the coronation of the Emperor Charles VI. In June 1713, after completing his studies, he returned to Düsseldorf where his father and sisters had settled. He may have accompanied Arent van Wassenaer Duyvenvoorde on a visit to Britain in 1715–16. He made a grand tour of France and Italy in 1717–18.

In 1723 Unico Wilhelm married Dodonea Lucia van Goslinga (the daughter of Sicco van Goslinga), with whom he had three children.

== Official positions ==
Unico Wilhelm had inherited the estate of Twickel from his father in 1714 and three years later was admitted as a knight of Overijssel. He lived in this region from 1719 to 1724, when he accepted a position in Holland. His older brother Johan Hendrik found him a position as water manager of the Rhineland (1723), counsel to the Admiralty (1724) and governor of the Dutch East India Company (1734). These jobs kept him in and around the Hague. After his brother died in 1745 he moved into the Van Wassenaer house in the Kneuterdijk. A year later he was admitted into the Dutch knighthood. Unico Wilhelm continued to spend part of his time at Twickel, and in 1726 he had maps made of this property and the rest of his inheritance.

In 1744 Unico Wilhelm was sent on a diplomatic mission to the French court, and in the autumn of 1744 and again in 1745 he was sent to the court of Clemens August, Elector of Cologne. In 1746 he went again to France, and finally in 1746–47 to Breda for further discussions with the French. Although clearly intelligent, Unico Wilhelm was not a natural diplomat. Unico Wilhelm was a commander of the Bailiwick of Utrecht of the Teutonic Order. He was made coadjutor in 1753, and introduced administrative and managerial innovations. In 1761 he was made Commander of the order. He died in The Hague on November 9, 1766.

== Music ==
While based at the Hague between 1725 and 1740, Unico Wilhelm wrote the six Concerti Armonici. The Concerti armonici, published anonymously in 1740, were printed in London in 1755 as compositions by the violinist and impresario Carlo Ricciotti (c. 1681–1756). It has since been established that these were the work of Unico Wilhelm. There is no evidence that Ricciotti wrote any music. The concerti were dedicated to Wilhelm's friend, Count Willem Bentinck. The slow movements of the concerti have expressive beauty.

The Polish composer Franciszek Lessel (1780–1838) asserted incorrectly that the concertos were written by Pergolesi. Since the style of the concertos is Italian, laid out in typical Roman fashion with four parts for violin and consisting of four parts instead of the Venetian three, they are comparable to works by Pietro Locatelli.

However, in 1979–1980 a manuscript of the six concerti was found in the archives of Twickel Castle (the castle where Van Wassenaer was born) labeled "Concerti Armonici." Although the handwriting was not by Van Wassenaer, the manuscript did have an introduction in his hand, reading: "Partition de mes concerts gravez par le Sr. Ricciotti". Because of the research done by the Dutch musicologist Albert Dunning, there can be no doubt that the concerti were, in fact, written by Van Wassenaer.

Dunning quotes the composer's Foreword in full--

"Score of my concertos, engraved by Signor Ricciotti. These concertos were composed at different times between 1725 and 1740. When they were ready, I took them along to the musical gathering organized in The Hague by Mr Bentinck, myself and some foreign gentlemen.

Ricciotti played the first violin. Afterwards I allowed him to make a copy of the concertos. When all six were ready, he asked permission to have them engraved. Upon my refusal he enlisted the aid of Mr Bentinck, to whose strong representations I finally acquiesced, on condition that my name did not appear anywhere on the copy and that he put his name to it, as he did. Mr Bentinck wanted to dedicate them to me; I refused absolutely, after which he told Ricciotti to dedicate them to him. In this way these concertos were published against my wishes.

Some of them are tolerable, some middling, others wretched. Had they not been published, I would perhaps have corrected the mistakes in them, but other business has left me no leisure to amuse myself with them, and I would have caused their editor offence."

Concerto Armonico No. 2 in B flat Major (Allegro moderato) was among the works that formed the basis for Igor Stravinsky's Pulcinella, Tarantella, based on works considered at the time to be by Giovanni Battista Pergolesi.

Apart from Concerti Armonici, three sonatas for recorder and continuo were also discovered in a Rostock archive by Wim Brabants in the early 1990s.

== Sources ==
- Count Unico Wilhelm van Wassenaer (1692–1766). A master unmasked, or the Pergolesi-Ricciotti puzzle solved. By Albert Dunning. Tr. by Joan Rimmer. Frits Knuf, 1980.
