= Frederik Johan van Baer =

Dutch States Army officer

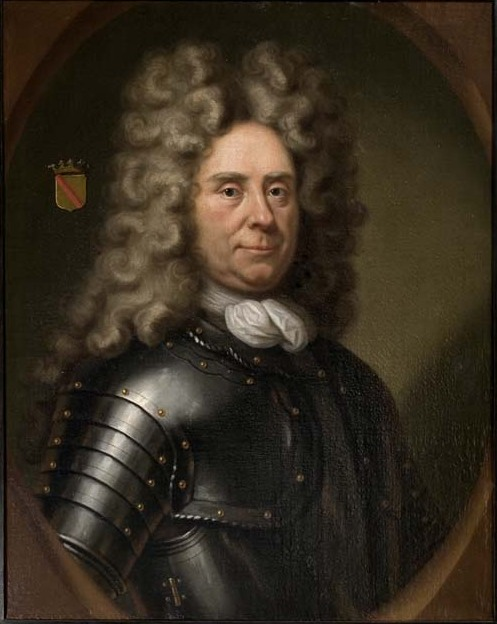
- Possible portrait of Slangenburg
- Born: 1645
- Died: 1713 (aged 67–68)
- Conflicts: (Incomplete list): Second Anglo-Dutch War; Franco-Dutch War; Battle of Seneffe; Siege of Maastricht; Nine Years' War; Battle of Walcourt; War of the Spanish Succession; Battle of Ekeren; Passage of the Lines of Brabant

Frederik Johan van Baer, Lord of Slangenburg (27 July 1645 – 15 December 1713) was a Dutch States Army officer. He served under William of Orange in the Franco-Dutch War and Nine Years' War. He was to become a controversial figure for his role in the War of the Spanish Succession. While a talented general, he possessed a very difficult character. Slangenburg was often at odds with his fellow generals, especially the Allied commander-in-chief, the Duke of Marlborough. The fame he acquired as a result of his conduct in the Battle of Ekeren was unable to prevent his eventual dismissal during the 1705 campaign, leading writer Thomas Lediard to remark that Slangenburg: lost by his tongue what he had gained by his sword.

== Family ==
He was the son of Herman van Baer van Slangenburg (1610–1653) and Catharina van Voorst (1620–1678). In 1665 he married Dorothea Petronella van Steenbergen, who died the same year. Frederik never remarried.

== Career ==
He was a professed Catholic, and therefore was denied a career in government. A career in the army was the obvious choice. Overcoming the challenges posed by his faith, he had a distinguished career in the Dutch Army, participating in the Franco-Dutch War, the Nine Years' War and the War of the Spanish Succession. At what age he entered military service is not known. The earliest known mention of Slangenburg as a state officer dates from 1668, when he was already a captain of infantry. This makes it probable that he participated in the Second Anglo-Dutch War too.

Early on he already managed to make himself one of William of Orange's favourites. From the Rampjaar of 1672 onwards, promotions followed one another in rapid succession. On 27 October 1672, he was made a major in the first Regiment of Van Stirum and less than a year later he had already been promoted to lieutenant-colonel. In 1675 he was retroactively appointed colonel of one of the Dutch-Scottish regiments on the basis of bravery shown during the Battle of Seneffe. During several battles, he personally led his regiment into battle. On 11 August 1676, he suffered a severe injury to one of his femurs during the Siege of Maastricht and had to be carried off the battlefield. His brave and skilful performance at Trois Trous against Marshal Luxembourg brought promotion to brigadier a year later. In 1678 the Dutch and French signed the Treaty of Nijmegen, which ended the Franco-Dutch War. He became major general in 1683.

In 1688 war broke out again with France. Slangenburg didn't join William III during his invasion in England, but served with the Allied army in the Spanish Netherlands. In 1689 he would play a decisive role in the Battle of Walcourt. On 7 January 1690, however, he arrived in England to complain personally to William about his bad relations with the Prince of Waldeck, under whose command he had to serve. With Waldeck he had been in constant conflict. At the same time, he applied for the lieutenant-general position. When it became clear that William III would not give him his way in this, he threatened to resign and furiously announced that both Emperor Leopold and the Elector of Bavaria were vying for his favour. Slangenburg eventually effectively resigned from the States Army in 1690, but two years later, at William III's intercession, he was retroactively appointed lieutenant general of infantry.

=== War of the Spanish Succession ===
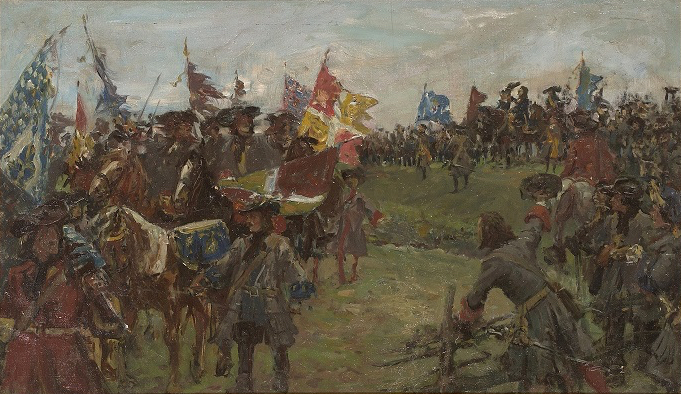
Parade of Dutch soldiers with captured French and Bavarian banners after the battle of Ekeren, by Jan Hoynck van Papendrecht

During the War of the Spanish Succession (1702–1713), Slangenburg's military career culminated. He was among the commanders of the Dutch troops that came to fight the Franco-Spanish army in the Southern Netherlands under the supreme command of an Englishman, the Duke of Marlborough. Initially the relations between senior Dutch commanders were extremely poor due to mutual rivalries and antipathies. At the same time, the Dutch officers were suspicious of Marlborough, whose troops were largely financed by the Dutch Republic, perceiving him to be pursuing a risky offensive strategy which in the event of a French breakthrough posed a great danger to the defence of the Republic's land provinces (Slangenburg was from one of the land provinces). Slangeburg was involved in secret consultations in The Hague as early as 1702 of 'malcontents' from various regions who did not trust Marlborough's intentions and tactics.

Slangenburg gained widespread fame on June 30, 1703, during the Battle of Ekeren. There, he successfully averted the encirclement and destruction of a Dutch division, who Obdam had manoeuvred into a dangerous position, despite warnings from his Slangenburg and Tilly. During the battle, Obdam was forced to flee and hastily retreated to Breda with a small contingent of soldiers, after which the command fell on Slangenburg. Outnumbered by at least two to one the fierce fighting claimed the lives of over seven hundred Dutch soldiers (as well as a considerable number of French and Spanish troops), but Slangenburg managed extract his forces from danger.

As a consequence of the battle of Slangenburg's reputation was greatly enhanced the expense of Obdam's. Dubbed the 'hero of Ekeren,' Slangenburg managed to send several captured standards, banners, and kettle drums to The Hague, where they were displayed as symbols of triumph in the great hall of the Binnenhof. After his performance at Ekeren, Slangenburg became even more outspoken and assertive. He not only refused to support a request for Obdam's rehabilitation but also openly clashed with other Dutch commanders and Marlborough. During the allocation of commands for subsequent operations in Flanders in 1703 and the recommendations for promotions following the campaign's conclusion, he felt overlooked in favor of officers he deemed less qualified. He nurtured ambitions of attaining the rank of field marshal. While his arguments were occasionally valid and his insights often accurate, his strong desire for recognition, lingering resentment, inflexibility, and the fervor with which he expressed his opinions increasingly irritated, especially the English ally.

On April 11, 1704, Slangenburg was promoted to the rank of General of Infantry and appointed as the commander of the Allied army on the Moselle. However, by the summer of 1705, his position had become untenable. Marlborough had held him responsible for the failure of a maneuver near the Yse river. While the Dutch general enjoyed support in the provincial regions of the Dutch Republic, he had to step down when it became apparent that Holland, particularly the city of Amsterdam, was unwilling to risk a rupture with Marlborough, who had already threatened to leave the combined Allied army. Efforts by his allies to compensate him with the governorship of Maastricht or Upper Guelders yielded no results. After a vicious smear campaign, Slangenburg withdrew in bitterness to the Slangenburg estates. Shortly after his dismissal, his reputation suffered further damage when, in a fit of anger, he nearly beat to death one of his servants.

== Life after service ==
After his dismissal Slangenburg rebuilt his ancestral mansion the "Slangenburg" near Doetinchem into a considerable castle, fitting his status. His wife is memorialized in many paintings there by Gerard Hoet.

His military reputation remained high however, and in 1710 Slangenburg was one of three candidates the Danish king considered for the command of his army.

== Legacy ==
Slangenburg's legacy is controversial. Anglo-American historians have historically blamed him for obstructionism, caused by his jealousy of Marlborough. The remarks of Winston Churchill, a famous Marlborough proponent, were especially damning. He blamed Slangenburg for preventing Marlborough from attacking the French at the Yse river and for essentially bringing down the Dutch Republic. He wrote:

... if the valiant Republic, to whom Protestant civilization owes an inestimable debt, was to be deprived of its fruition in modern times, condemned for ever to be a minor Power while rivals grew so great, this was the fatal scene. Here by the cross-roads of bodeful Waterloo, as earlier upon the heaths of Peer, the destinies of Holland turned; and upon that milestone there may well be inscribed the not otherwise noticeable name of Slangenberg.

This is countered by the account of Dutch historian Jan Willem Wijn, who argues that it is doubtful that an attack would have been a success. Olaf van Nimwegen claimed that Marlborough's willingness to attack strong French positions resulted from desperation. Willem Jan Knoop, a critic of Marlborough, also scrutinized Slangenburg, but reserved greater criticism for the English duke, casting doubt on Marlborough's sincerity in his readiness to engage in battle. According to Knoop, despite his purported intentions Marlborough failed to undertake the requisite measures to prepare his army for combat, writing:

Little chance of winning; great chance of suffering severe losses in defeat; - that double consideration should have deterred from engaging in battle, and we are fully convinced that Marlborough did not desire the battle. But he pretended as if he did; placed in a situation by earlier mistakes where everything he did must give rise to justifiable criticisms, he wanted to appear as if he was not free in his actions; he wanted to shift the responsibility onto others for what he himself had done wrong.

Even though historians agree that Slangenburg was difficult to handle and could not fully submit to commanders other than William III, they generally acknowledge that he was a talented military leader. Jan Willem Wijn writes:

The ideal solution would have been for Slangenburg, in the highly coveted rank of Field Marshal—for which he was more suited than Ouwerkerk or Obdam—to lead the Dutch troops and collaborate with Marlborough in a magnanimous manner, much like Prince Eugene of Savoy. However, his difficult character was an almost insurmountable obstacle to this.

== Sources ==
- Churchill, Winston (1936). Marlborough: His Life and Times. George G. Harrap Co. Ltd London.
- Gietman, Conrad (2006). "Frederik Johan van Baer". Biografisch Woordenboek Gelderland, deel 5, Bekende en onbekende mannen en vrouwen uit de Gelderse geschiedenis (in Dutch).
- Tuxen, August; Hansen, A. L.; With, C. L. (1906). Bidrag til Den Store Nordiske Krigs Historie. Bind III: Felttogene i Nordtyskland og Baahuslen, i Østersøen og Kattegat, 1710-1712 (in Danish). Copenhagen: Gyldendalske Boghandel Nordisk Forlag.
- Van Nimwegen, Olaf (2020). De Veertigjarige Oorlog 1672–1712. Prometheus. ISBN 978-90-446-3871-4.
- Knoop, Jan Willem (1865). "1705. Een veldtogt uit den Spaanschen Successie-oorlog". De Gids (29): 402–473.
- Wijn, J.W. (1956). Het Staatsche Leger: Deel VIII-1 Het tijdperk van de Spaanse Successieoorlog 1702–1705 (The Dutch States Army: Part VIII-1 The era of the War of the Spanish Succession 1702–1705) (in Dutch). Martinus Nijhoff.
