= Jacob van Wassenaer Obdam (younger) =

Dutch States Army officer

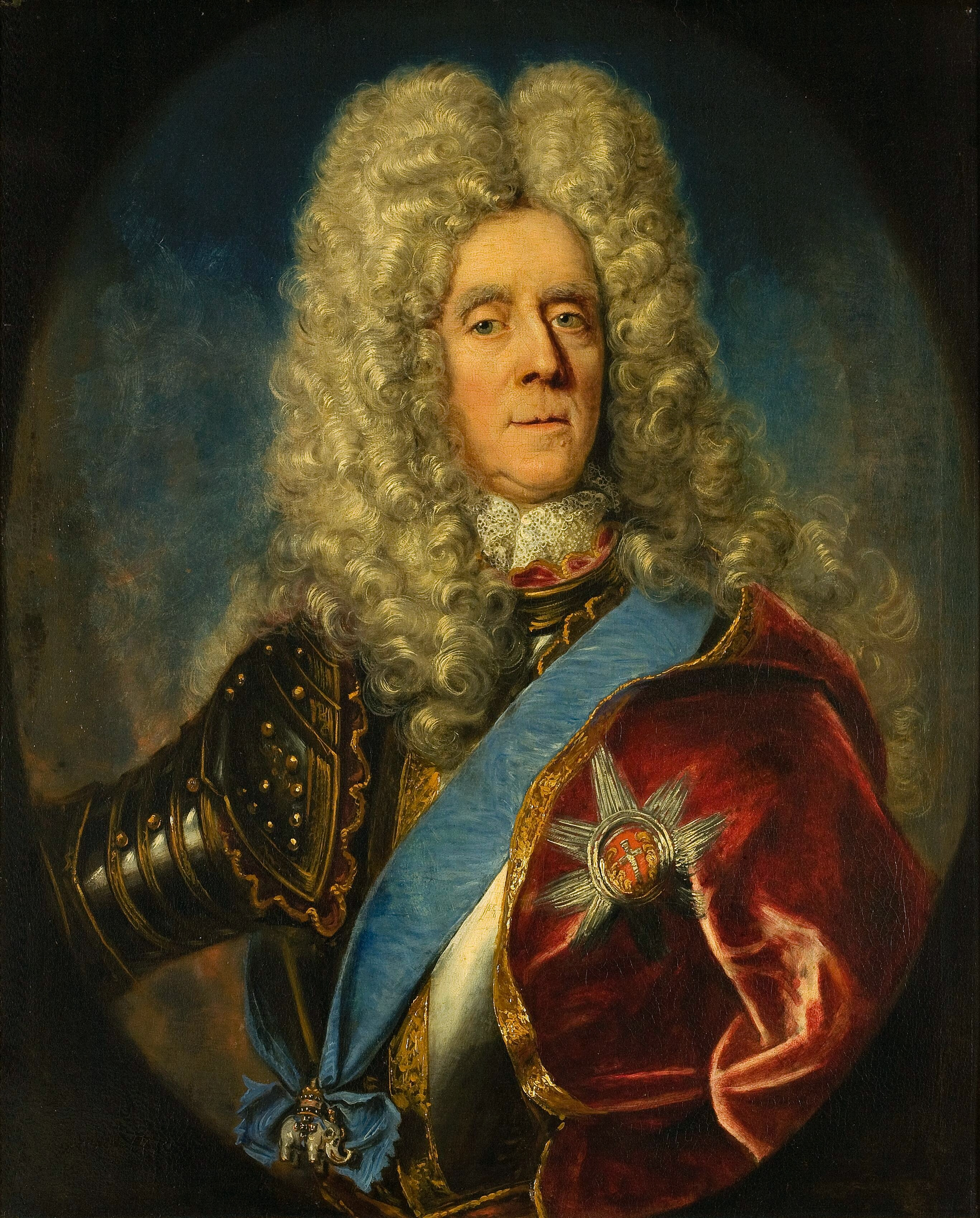
- Portrait of Jacob van Wassenaer Obdam
- Born: 25 August 1635 Heusden, Dutch Republic
- Died: 24 May 1714 (aged 78) The Hague, Dutch Republic
- Battles / wars: (Incomplete): Franco-Dutch War; Battle of Seneffe; Nine Years' War; Battle of Landen; War of the Spanish Succession; Siege of Venlo; Siege of Roermond; Siege of Bonn; Battle of Ekeren

Jacob van Wassenaer Obdam (25 August 1635 – 24 May 1714) was a Dutch States Army officer from the prominent Van Wassenaer family who served in the Franco-Dutch War, Nine Years' War and War of the Spanish Succession. His extensive career made him eligible for the supreme command of the Dutch States Army in 1703, but his military career came to an abrupt end after he fled his army during the Battle of Ekeren and the position was given to Hendrik van Nassau-Ouwerkerk instead.

He was born in Heusden, the son of the famous Dutch Admiral Jacob van Wassenaer Obdam. On 19 May 1676 at Delden he married Adriana Sophia van Raesfelt. Their son was composer and diplomat Unico Wilhelm van Wassenaer.

Unlike his father, he chose career in the army, rather than the navy. In 1702 he led the siege of Venlo, not completely to the satisfaction of Marlborough, his superior.

In 1703 his army of 10 000 men was surrounded by 40 000 French at Ekeren. Considering all hope for a breakthrough lost, Obdam abandoned his army and escaped with 30 men, disguising themselves as Frenchmen. When he arrived in the Netherlands, he wrote a letter admitting the total destruction of his army. But the army, now under General Slangenburg, had forced an escape route late in the evening and saved itself. The struggle was known as the Battle of Ekeren.

Obdam's behavior wasn't forgiven, and his military career was finished. He was appointed Governor of 's-Hertogenbosch and became Ambassador to the Elector Palatine between 1708 and 1712. He died in The Hague in 1714.
