= Battle of Cádiz (1702) =

1702 siege

- Part of the War of the Spanish Succession
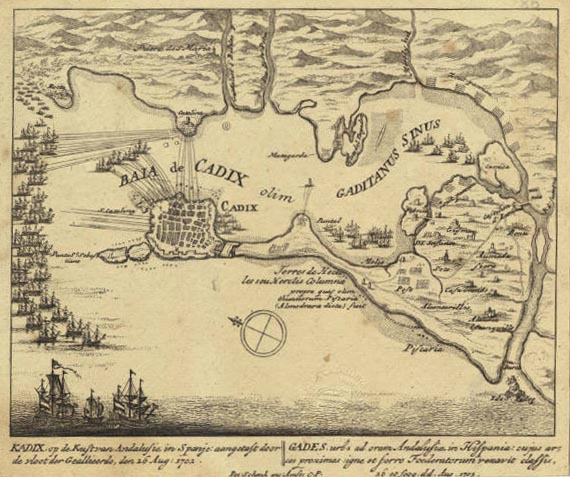
- Contemporary map of the Battle of Cádiz 1702.
Date	23 August – 30 September 1702
Location	Cádiz, Andalusia, Spain; 36°34′30″N 6°18′00″W
Result	Spanish victory

Belligerents
Spain	England; Dutch Republic

Commanders and leaders
(Spain) Marquis of Villadarias	(England) George Rooke (England) Duke of Ormonde

Strength
Garrison: 300 regulars and 150 horsemen Relief: 500–600 cavalry A few thousand soldiers	50 ships: 30 English ships; 20 Dutch ships; 14,000 men

The Battle of Cádiz was an attempt by English and Dutch forces to seize the southern Spanish port of Cádiz in 1702 during the War of the Spanish Succession. The Andalusian port of Cádiz served as the centre of Spanish trade with its American colonies. As such, the port's capture would not only help to sever Spain's links with her empire in the Americas, but it would also provide the Allies with a strategically important base from which the English and Dutch navies could control the western Mediterranean Sea.

The military build-up was accompanied by Allied diplomatic measures in Portugal aimed at enticing King Peter II to join the Grand Alliance. The Allies also intended to garner support in Spain for an insurrection in the name of the Austrian pretender to the Spanish throne, the Archduke Charles. The battle was the first of the war in the Iberian Peninsula, but due to interservice rivalry, ill discipline, poor co-operation, and a skilful defence from the Marquis of Villadarias, Admiral George Rooke was unable to complete his objective and, after a month, he set sail for home.

== Background ==
On 15 May 1702 the Powers of the Grand Alliance, led by England and the Dutch Republic, declared war on France and Spain. Emperor Leopold I also declared war on the Bourbon powers, but his forces under Prince Eugene had already begun hostilities in northern Italy along the Po Valley in an attempt to secure for Austria the Spanish Duchy of Milan. Eugene's successful 1701 campaign had aroused enthusiasm in England for war against France, and helped Emperor Leopold's efforts in persuading King William III to send an Allied fleet to the Mediterranean Sea. Count Wratislaw, the Emperor's envoy in England, urged that the sight of an Allied fleet in the Mediterranean would effect a revolution in the Spanish province of Naples; win south Italy from the precarious grip of Philip V; overawe the Francophile Pope Clement XI; and encourage the Duke of Savoy – and other Italian princes – to change sides. More modestly, Prince Eugene pleaded for a squadron to protect the passage of his supplies from Trieste across the Adriatic.

The English had their own interests in the Mediterranean: the Levant Company needed escorts, and an Allied naval presence could challenge the dominance of King Louis’ Toulon fleet, an attack on which could deliver a mortal blow to French naval power. It was clear, however, that before the Allies could commit to the Mediterranean strategy, it would first be necessary to secure a base in the Iberian Peninsula. The decision to favour Cádiz – the capture of which would open the Straits, and place in Allied hands the gate to the trade with the New World – was taken before the death of King William III in March 1702, but the policy was continued under his successor Queen Anne, and her ministers led by the Earl of Marlborough.

England's representatives at the Portuguese court in Lisbon, John Methuen and his son Paul, were also clamouring for a strong naval demonstration on the Spanish coast to encourage the wavering King Peter II to annul his recent treaties with France and Spain, and join the Grand Alliance. The Methuens were assisted by Prince George of Hesse-Darmstadt, a cousin of the Empress Eleonora. The Allies hoped that whilst the Methuens negotiated with the Portuguese, the Prince could inspire and even direct the pro-Austrian insurrection in Spain on behalf of the Emperor's youngest son and pretender to the Spanish throne, the Archduke Charles.

== Prelude ==
The Anglo-Dutch fleet set sail at the end of July and passed down the Portuguese coast on 20 August. Admiral Rooke commanded 50 warships (30 English, 20 Dutch), and transports, totalling 160 sail in all; Ormonde, commander of the troops, had under him 14,000 men in total – 10,000 English (including 2,400 marines) and 4,000 Dutch. Yet Rooke had no faith in the expedition: his ships had insufficient victuals for a prolonged campaign, and he had concerns over the French port of Brest which lay between himself and England.

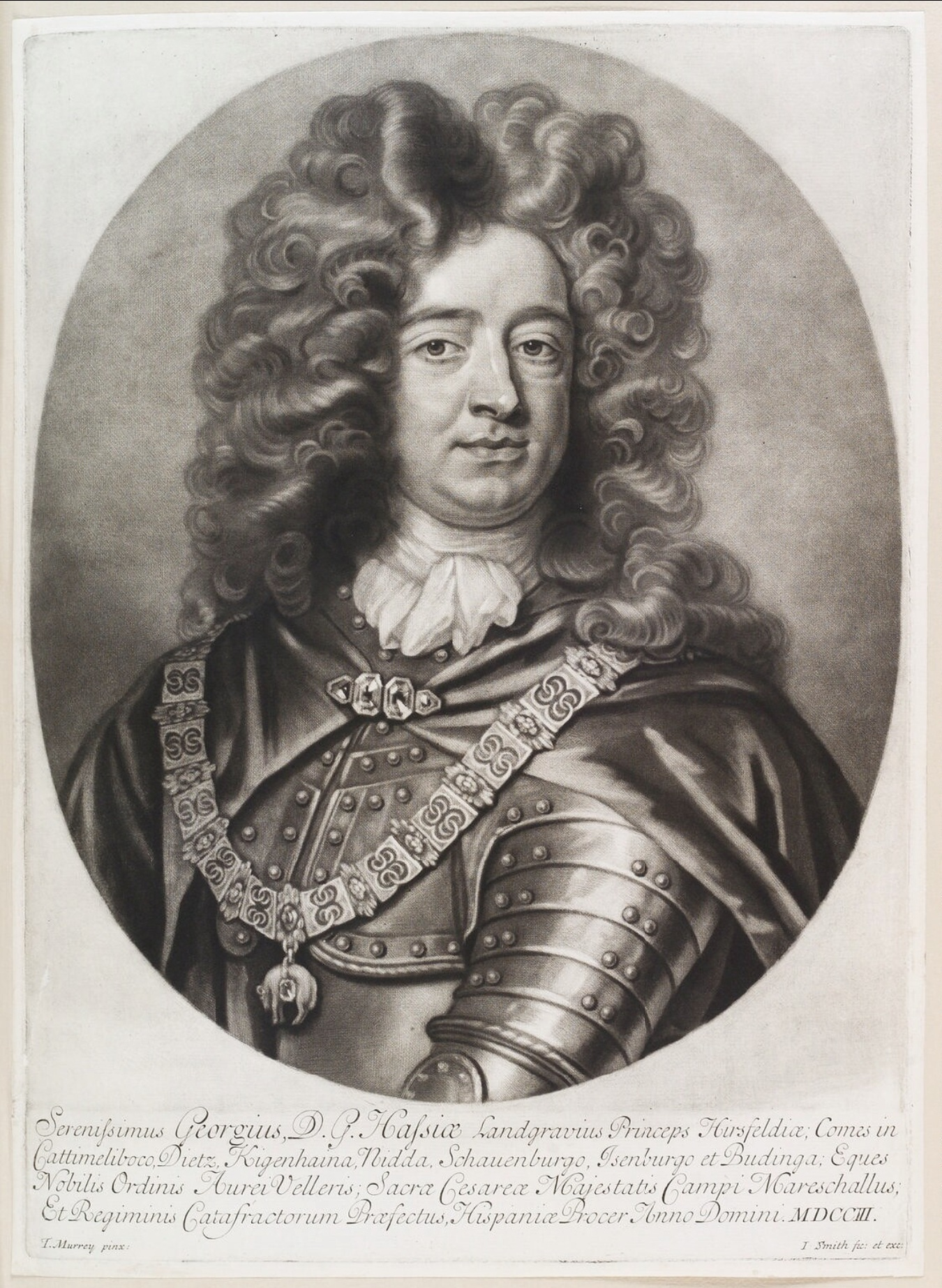
George of Hesse-Darmstadt, who accompanied the Anglo-Dutch fleet in the interests of Austria

Prince George, in his ship the Adventure, had joined the fleet at Cape St. Vincent. Both the Prince and Paul Methuen (who had also joined the expedition), reported to Rooke that Cádiz was poorly defended, but the admiral's own intelligence, received from captured fisherman, suggested that a powerful garrison of Spanish regulars had already strengthened the city. Allied doubts about the real strength opposing them were exacerbated by the Spanish stratagem of lighting extensive fires along the heights. Therefore, after the Allied fleet anchored off Cádiz on 23 August, three days were spent in futile discussions before any decision was reached.

There were several options for the Allied attack. According to Rooke's journal of 25 August, Sir Stafford Fairborne:

… having proposed to the Admiral his forcing the harbour and destroying the eight French galleys which lay under the walls of Cádiz, he [the Admiral] called a council of flag officers to consider the same; but … it was unanimously judged unreasonable and impracticable to hazard any the least frigate on such an attempt.

Another option for the Allies was to land the army under the cover of a bombardment by the fleet on the isthmus dividing Cádiz from the mainland; from there, the troops could storm the city. This tactic was Ormonde's preference, but Major-General Sir Charles O’Hara insisted that a landing on the isthmus was inadvisable unless the navy could guarantee the landing of supplies on a daily basis, which, because of the lee shore, they could not. Ormonde's second choice was a blockade, supported by a bombardment of the town; but there was doubt that the ships could anchor close enough for an effective bombardment. In any case, Prince George objected to such a plan for fear of alienating the population. The decision, therefore, was to land the Allied troops between the Bay of Bulls and Fort Saint Catherine. This suited the navy because they could bring their ships near to the shore, and from the beachhead troops could seize the towns of Rota and Port Saint Mary. However, the landing place was a long way from the base of the isthmus on which Cádiz stood. (See map below).

Don Francisco del Castillo, Marquis of Villadarias, was given command in the threatened province of Andalusia. Cádiz, Andalusia's main city, held a garrison of some 300 poorly equipped men with a similar number lining the shore, but the sudden appearance of the Allied fleet engendered a state of emergency, and, in Philip Stanhope's words, ‘the spirit and determination to repel it’. The wealthy cities of Cordova and Seville contributed to the Spanish cause, the nobles took up arms, and the local peasantry were organised into battalions, so that after boosting the city's garrison Villadarias could still muster in the field five or six hundred good horsemen, and several thousand militia. To increase the strength of his position further, the Spanish commander secured the harbour by drawing a strong boom and sinking two large hulks across its entrance.

== Battle ==
=== Landing and looting ===
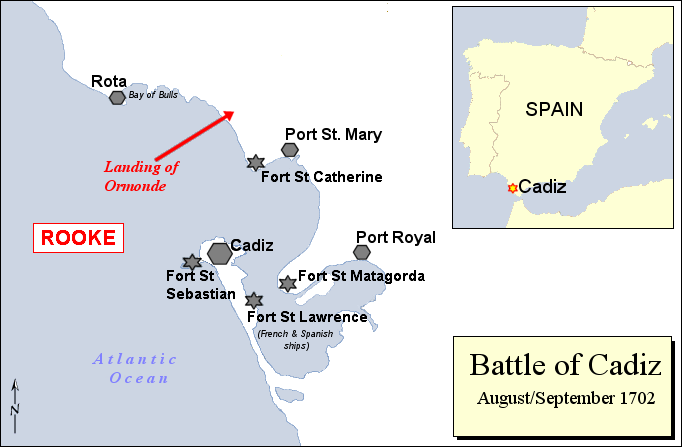
Battle of Cádiz 1702.

The landing took place on 26 August in a fresh wind, resulting in the loss of some 25 landing craft, and 20 men drowned. Fire from a Spanish 4-gun battery, and a charge from a squadron of cavalry offered resistance to the landing. The foremost ranks of the Allied forces consisted of grenadiers who repulsed the Spanish horsemen. Nevertheless, one of the Allied officers, Colonel James Stanhope, who later became British commander-in-chief in Spain, praised the courage of the English and Spanish troops engaged in the small action, admitting that 200 more such horsemen would have spoiled the Allied descent.

From the landing place Ormonde's forces marched on Rota. The town was found deserted (although after a while the governor and some of the inhabitants returned to greet them). The Allies stayed here for two days, disembarking horses and stores. Although military power remained in Anglo-Dutch hands, Prince George had been granted the head of the civil administration in any town occupied by the Allies. He distributed manifestos calling on Spaniards to declare for the House of Austria; the fact that some came forward to join the Allies at Rota was of value, for the Imperial representative was dependent on local volunteers to make contact with other inhabitants. However, the Spanish authorities had taken severe measures to prevent desertion to the allied cause, threatening with hanging anyone caught in possession of one of Prince George's manifestos.

The Allies proceeded to take Fort Saint Catherine, before entering the town of Port Saint Mary. Ormonde's men initially encamped beyond the town, but the mistake was to allow them to return to it. The troops found the town full of unguarded warehouses stuffed full of goods, and the cellars full of wine and brandy, most of which was owned by English and Dutch merchants doing business under Spanish names. The men helped themselves, lost control, and fell to looting, destroying, and plundering, not just the warehouses, but also convents and churches. Prince George despaired and sent home a report damning the conduct of the officers, particularly Ormonde's subordinates, Sir Henry Belasys (Ormonde's second-in-command), O’Hara, and the Dutch Baron Sparre, whom he held responsible for persuading Ormonde to quarter the troops in the town. The navy were not at first involved in the looting, but they were soon tempted to take their share.

The cause of Archduke Charles had suffered a serious setback due to the behaviour and misconduct of Ormonde's men, who, according to Trevelyan, plundered Saint Mary to 'the bare walls'. A local English merchant wrote disparagingly, "our fleet has left such a filthy stench among the Spaniards that a whole age will hardly blot it out." These excesses ended any hope that the local population would desert Philip V and join with the Allies, and were a boost to Bourbon propaganda. Rooke himself reported that, "the inhumane plundering of Port Saint Mary made a great noise here by sea and land, and will do so throughout Christendom."

=== Re-embarkation ===
The immediate effects of the looting were detrimental to the expedition; the army thought mainly of taking their spoils home and, according to David Francis, lost their combative spirit. For their part, the navy feared for the ships anchored off a lee shore, which in bad weather was dangerous. Nevertheless, the army's long march from the landing place to their objective required assistance from the men in Rooke's fleet. Crew members built bridges, cut fascines, dug trenches, fetched and carried, but, due to sickness, there was never enough labour available. Rooke was eventually obliged to limit these onerous demands on his sailors, declaring that "such slavish labour was not for seamen." The admiral may have had no choice, but it was a blow to army–navy relations.

After the occupation of Port Saint Mary the advance lost momentum. The marshy coast as far as Port Royal was occupied, and the English generals became more recalcitrant. However, Baron Sparr insisted on attacking Fort Matagorda situated on the Puntales (a sandy spit near the entrance to the inner harbour), thus enabling the entry of Rooke's fleet into the anchorage, before destroying the enemy ships within. With 600 Dutch and 1,600 English troops, the Allies made a causeway across the deep sand and brought a battery close to the stronghold, but they now found themselves within range of the Franco-Spanish ships anchored behind the boom – commanded by Conde de Fernan Núñez – and in a vulnerable position; they were also subject to attack from the galleys which still lurked outside the harbour.

Villadarias, meanwhile, continued to harass detached Allied parties and cut off their communications; by a sudden attack he also recaptured Rota whose garrison commander, the former governor, was condemned to death and executed as a traitor. The Allies made little or no progress. Matagorda held out, and after several days Rooke declared that even if the fort was taken, the other stronghold guarding the Puntales entrance would prevent the fleet from navigating the narrow passage. On 26 September, therefore, facing certain failure, the decision was taken to re-embark the troops. A plan to bombard the city (against Prince George's wishes) was abandoned due to bad weather, and, after a further council of war, the fleet left on 30 September. The attempt to seize Cádiz had ended in abject failure.

== Aftermath ==
The fact that no Spanish notables had joined the Allies during their time at Cádiz meant a loss of prestige for Prince George; but he did receive aboard his ship a deputation of Spanish grandees from Madrid which had missed him in Lisbon, and had been ferried over from Faro. The Prince informed Rooke and Ormonde that they were ready to declare for the House of Austria, but they were not prepared to commit themselves unless the Allies could guarantee them adequate support, and leave a force to winter in Spain. This assistance was not forthcoming. There had, however, already been a number of Castilian defections, the most startling of which was that of the Admiral of Castile, Juan de Cabrera, Duke of Rioseco and Count of Melgar. After leaving Madrid on 13 September 1702, he fled to Portugal where he issued a denunciation of the Bourbon government and entered the service of the Archduke Charles.

Ormonde and Prince George wanted to land at another key place in Spain but Rooke, concerned about the autumnal gales, decided to head for England. By now Ormonde and Rooke were barely on speaking terms: the general thought he could have taken Cádiz were it not for Rooke vetoing his plan; for his part, the admiral had written bitterly to Ormonde regarding the behaviour of the soldiers on shore. However, it was fortunate for Rooke, Ormonde, and the Allied cause, that news of a Spanish silver fleet from America had arrived off the coast of Galicia. The subsequent Battle of Vigo Bay was considerably more successful than the attempt on Cádiz (although the financial rewards were far less than expected), and the victory had taken the edge off the failed expedition. Nevertheless, when the fleet returned to England the House of Lords insisted on an inquiry into the conduct of the Allies at Cádiz.

The bad feeling between Rooke and Ormonde had led to hopes of a fruitful inquiry, but the success at Vigo had given the Tories the opportunity to build up Rooke as a hero; Ormonde was also given a triumphal reception and rallied to the Tory side. The inquiry, therefore, became a party struggle: the Tories glorifying Rooke and Ormonde, whilst the Whigs remained critical. The two Allied commanders made an obdurate joint defence before the House of Lord's Committee. However, a Court-Martial was held into the conduct of Belasys and O’Hara. O’Hara was cleared but Belasys was dismissed from the service. Both men were expected to lose their regiments, yet Belasys was later reinstated, and O’Hara was promoted to lieutenant-general in 1704.
