= Karel Willem Sparre =

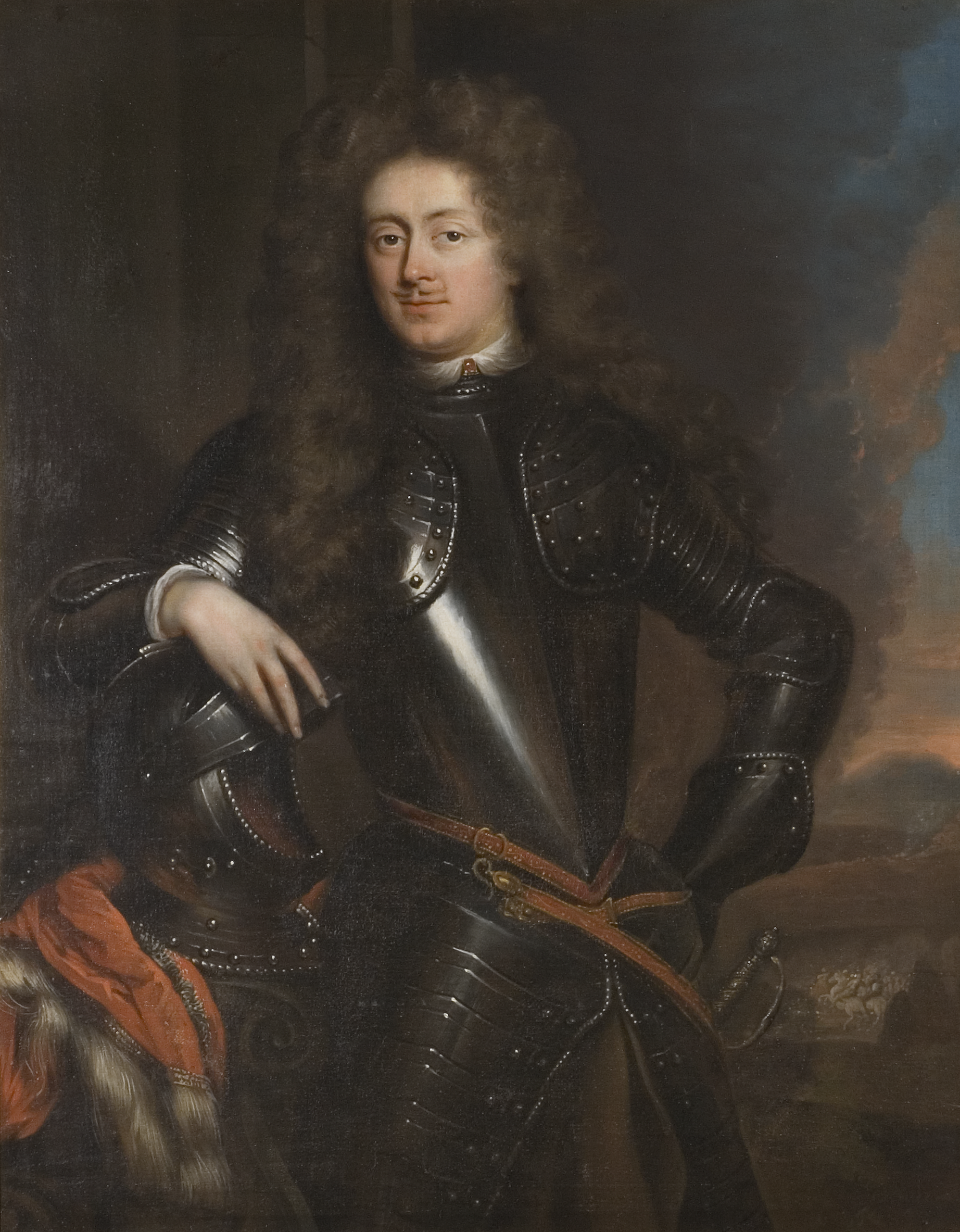
- Born: 19 July 1661; Sweden
- Died: 27 October 1710 (aged 48–49); Brussel, Spanish Netherlands
- Military career
- Allegiance: Swedish Empire (1688–1691); Dutch Republic (1691–1709)
- Branch: Infantry
- Rank: Lieutenant general
- Unit: Dutch States Army
- Conflicts: Nine Years' War; War of the Spanish Succession; Battle of Cádiz; Battle of Vigo Bay; Battle of Stekene; Attack on Fort Saint Philippe; Battle of Ramillies; Siege of Ostend; Battle of Oudenarde; Siege of Lille; Battle of Malplaquet

Willem Karel, Baron of Sparre, (19 July 1661 – 27 October 1710) was a Dutch States Army officer and nobleman. In this capacity, he took part in the Nine Years' War and played a prominent role in the War of the Spanish Succession. He would die of an injury sustained during the bloody Battle of Malplaquet.

Sicco van Goslinga, one of the Dutch field deputies that accompanied the allied army, and personal friend of Sparre had this to say about Sparre:

Sparre, descended from one of the great families of Sweden, had an outstanding intellect, a penetrating judgment, courage as much as one can have, good conduct and vigilance; he had that quick eye, which is so rare and yet so necessary for a commander in battle; he saw everything, provided for everything, was in one word fit to command an entire army...

== Sources ==
- Knoop, Willem Jan (1867). Krijgs – en geschiedkundige geschriften. Deel 8 [Military and historical writings. Volume 8] (in Dutch). H. A. M. Roelants.
