= Fort Lillo =

Coordinates: 51°18′16″N 4°17′22″E

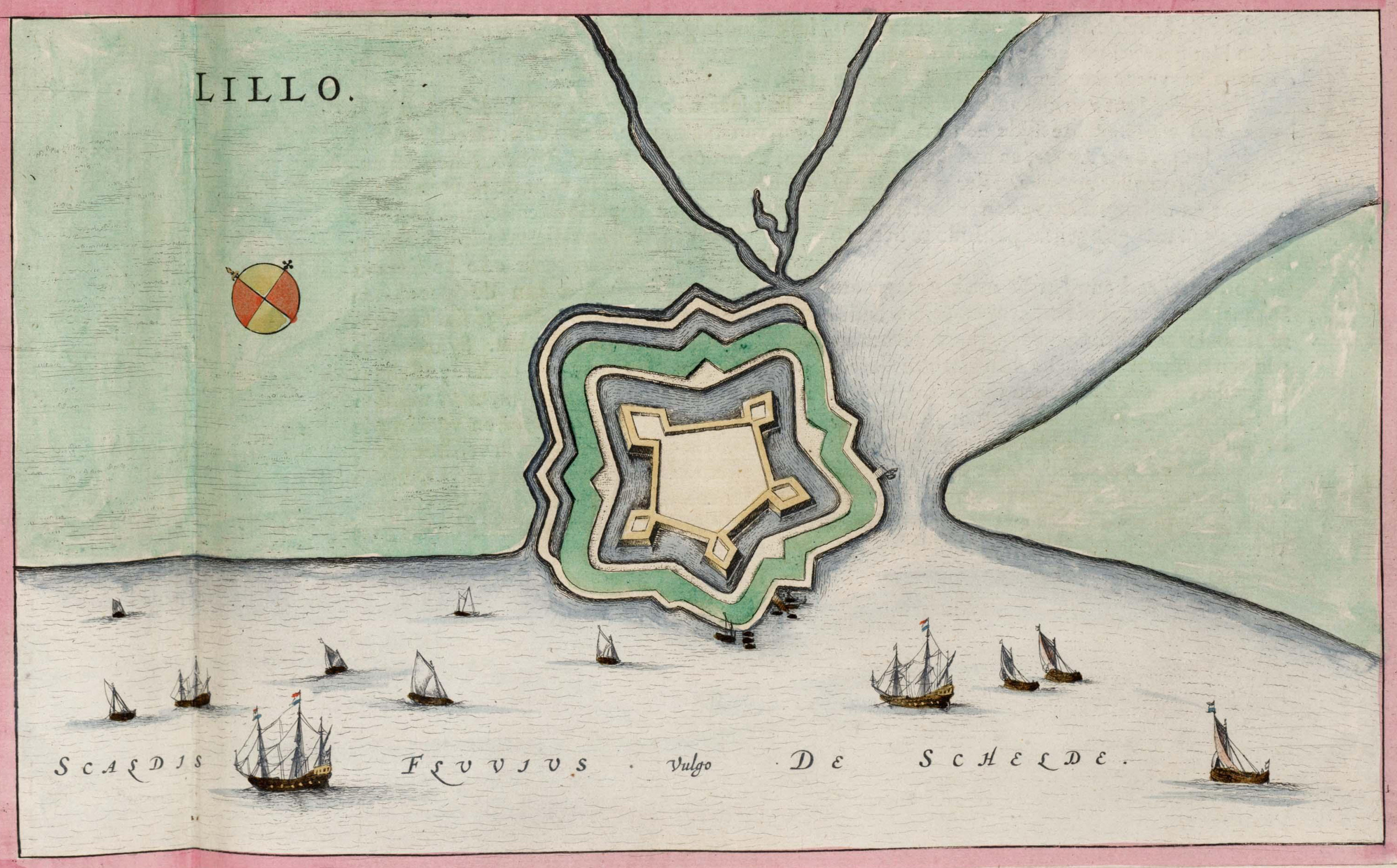
Plan of Fort Lillo, 1650

Fort Lillo is a former military fort built as part of the Antwerp Defence Line on the right bank of the Schelde, and completely surrounded by the industrial port of Antwerp.

== History ==
Built between 1579–82 on the orders of William the Silent to defend Antwerp, in 1809 during the Napoleonic Wars the fort was attacked by the British while under occupation by the forces of Napoleon. Along with Fort Liefkenshoek on the opposite bank of the Scheldt, these heavily armed defences proved a formidable obstacle to attacking forces.

Of the three towns that formerly comprised the village of Lillo, Fort Lillo is the only one to survive, the other two - Oud Lillo (lit. "Old Lillo") and Lillo-Kruisweg (lit. "Lillo Crossroads") were evacuated in 1958 then demolished and razed to allow the expansion of the port of Antwerp. Fort Lillo shared the fate of three other polder villages: Wilmarsdonk, Oosterweel, and Oorderen. Fort Lillo has been preserved and is today part of the "ethonological polder" historical ground north of Antwerp.

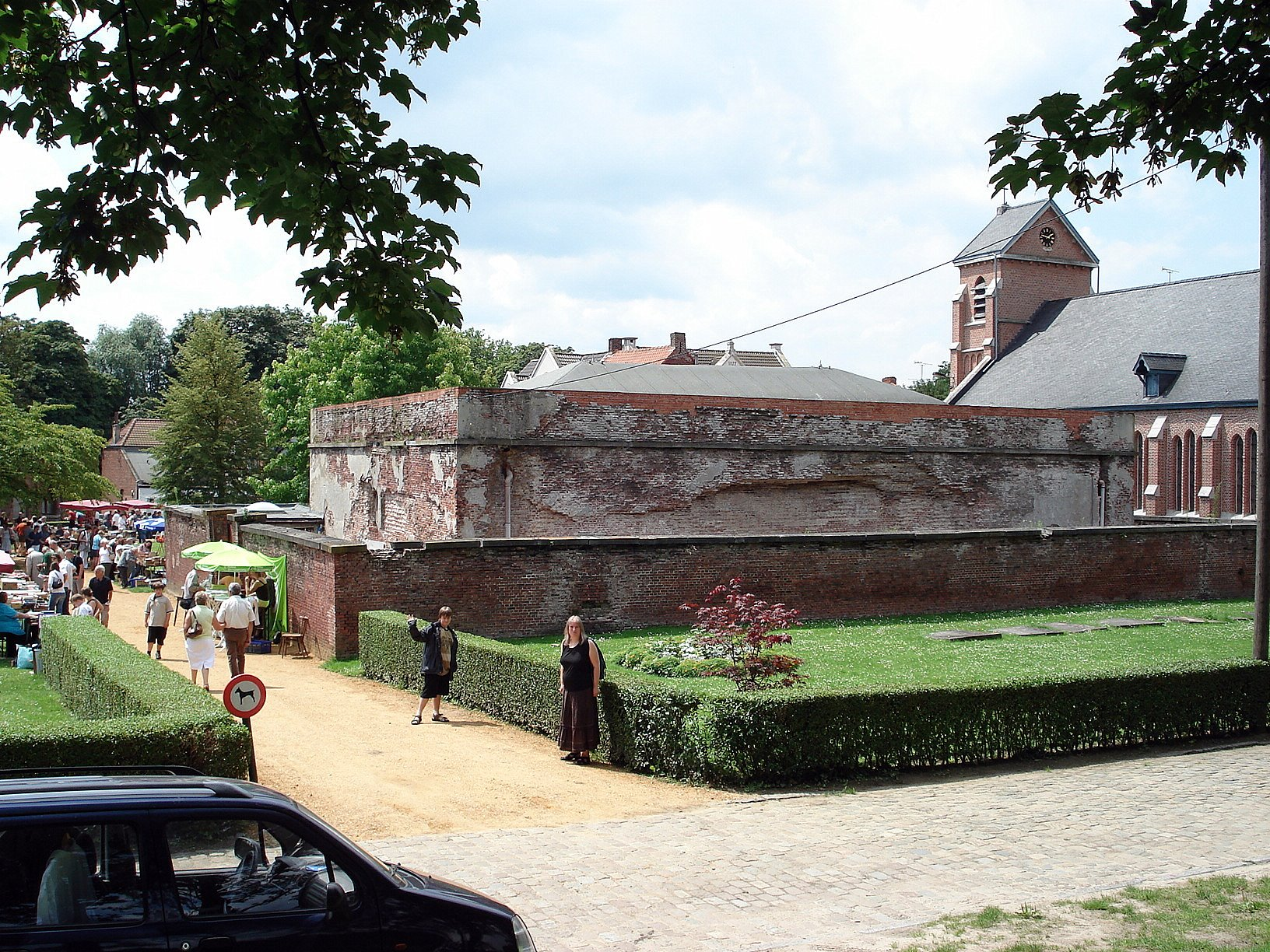
Fort Lillo: the small rectangular building is the powder store with the church of St. Benoit on the right.
