= Thomas Lediard =

English writer and surveyor

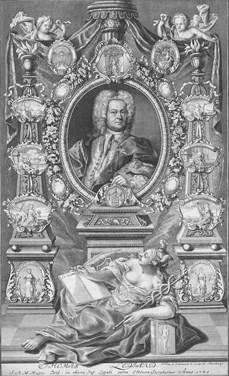
Thomas Lediard, from his Eine Collection verschiedener Vorstellungen in Illuminationen (1730)

Thomas Lediard (1685–1743) was an English writer and surveyor.

== Life ==
In early life, by his own account, he was attached to the staff of the Duke of Marlborough, particularly in 1707, on the occasion of the Duke's visit to Charles XII of Sweden. He is assumed to have been there as a diplomat, an attaché to the embassy at Hamburg, seconded as a foreign secretary. He was then, for many years, secretary to the British envoy extraordinary in Hamburg, Sir Cyril Wyche, 1st Baronet. There, Lediard was a stage designer at the Oper am Gänsemarkt, for Wyche, who, beginning in 1722, served as one of the theater's directors.

Lediard returned to England some time before 1732 and settled in Smith Square, Westminster. In February 1738 he wrote a proposal for Westminster Bridge. Possibly as a consequence, he was appointed Agent and Surveyor of Westminster Bridge. On 13 July 1742 the Crown lands from Westminster Bridge to Charing Cross were granted to him and Sir Joseph Ayloffe, to hold in trust to the Commissioners appointed to build the bridge. On 9 December 1742 Lediard was elected a Fellow of the Royal Society. Early in 1743 he resigned his appointment as Surveyor of the bridge, and died shortly afterwards, in June 1743. He was succeeded in the post by his son Thomas.

== Works ==
Lediard's most famous works were his The Naval History of Englandand his The Life of John, Duke of Marlborough, in the preface of which he claimed to write from personal eyewitness knowledge of some of the transactions, particularly as part of Marlborough's retinue to King Charles XII of Sweden. and to have had access to important letters and papers, although he did not have access to the Blenheim Palace archive. The Duchess of Marlborough impugned his work when she wrote in 1744 "I have read Lediard's History, which I never did before. I suppose that must be because some of my acquaintances that might have told me of it, said nothing from disliking some things in it, which I do very much." Lediard also contributed to the third volume of Rapin de Thoyras's The History of the Reigns of William III and Mary, and Anne, in continuation of the History of England (1737). 2nd edit. (1738). In addition, he published translations and contributed to etymological works.

- An exact and particular description of the beautiful illumination, prospect of the City of London, and fire-works, (together with all the emblems, inscriptions and mottos, and two large cuts of the same finely grav'd) to be represented in a Prologue and an Epilogue to the opera Julius Cæsar in Ægypt, on the stage of Hambro', Monday June 9. N.S. 1727. At celebrating the anniversary of His most sacred Majesty, George, Lewis, King of Great Britain's, &c. &c. &c. most solemn birth-day: in humble duty offer'd to the Right Honourable Cyrill Wich, Esq. His Majesty's Envoy Extraordinary to the Princes and Hance-Tows [sic] in the Circle of Lower Saxony &c. By His Excellency's most faithful and obedient servant and secretary Thomas Lediard. Hambro: printed by Philip Lewis Stromer, [1727].
- A particular description of four curious illuminations, (together with all the emblems, inscriptions and mottos, and two large cuts of the same finely grav'd) as represented in a musical entertainment on the stage of Hambro', October 12. N.S. 1727. Being the day appointed for solemnizing the coronation of their most sacred Majesties, George II. and Caroline, King and Queen of Great Britain, &c. &c. &c. By command of the Right Honourable Cyrill Wich, Esq. His Majesty's Envoy Extraordinary to the Princes and Hance Towns in the Circle of Lower Saxony &c. invented by His Excellency's Secretary Thomas Lediard. Hambro' : printed by Philip Lewis Stromer, [1727]
- A plan of civil and historical architecture, in the representation of the most noted buildings of foreign nations, both ancient and modern: ... display'd in 86. large double folio-plates, finely engraven, ... divided into five books; ... by John Bernhard Fischer of Erlach; ... First publish'd at Leipzig, in the year 1725. ... in German and French, ... and now faithfully done into English, with additional notes, by Thomas Lediard, ... [London] : Anno, 1730. A second edition: "London: published at the expence of the translator, and to be had only at his house in Smith's-Square, Westminster; and during the sessions of Parliament, at the pamphlet shop, in the Court of Requests, MDCCXXXVII. [1737]"
- Britannia. An English opera. As it is perform'd at the New Theatre in the Hay-Market. With the representation and description of a transparent theatre, illuminated, and adorn'd with a great number of emblems, Mottoes, Devices and Inscriptions, and embellish'd with Machines, in a manner entirely New. By Mr. Lediard. Late Secretary to His Majesty's Envoy Extraordinary in Hamburg, and many Years Director of the Opera House in that City. The musick compos'd after the Italian manner, by Mr. Lampe. London: printed for J. Watts at the Printing-Office in Wild-Court near Lincoln's-Inn Fields, MDCCXXXII. [1732]
- The history of England. Written originally in French by M. Rapin de Thoyras. Translated into English by John Kelly of the Inner Temple, Esq; to which is added, critical and explanatory notes; also Chronological and Genealogical tables: with some particulars of the life of M. Rapin." London: printed for James Mechell, at the King's Arms, near Red Lion Street, High Holborn, MDCCXXXII. [1732]. Vol.3 is dated 1737 and contains a list of subscribers." The reigns of King William III and Queen Mary: and also that of Queen Anne, are impartially continued by Thomas Lediard, ..".
- An appeal to the publick; or, Burchett and Lediard compar'd: being an impartial and just parallel, between Mr. Burchett's Compleat history of the most remarkable transactions at sea, &c. and Mr. Lediard's Naval history of England, ... By a lover of truth [Thomas Lediard], and a friend to both these authors. London: printed for T. Gover, printer; and sold by J. Roberts; and at the pamphlet-shops in London and Westminster, 1735.
- The naval history of England, in all its branches; from the Norman conquest in the year 1066. to the conclusion of 1734. Collected from the most approved historians, English and foreign, authentick records and manuscripts, scarce tracts, original journals, &c. with many facts and observations, never before made publick. By Thomas Lediard, gent. late secretary to His Majesty's envoy extraordinary in Lower Germany. In two volumes. London : Printed for John Wilcox, at Virgil's Head, opposite the New Church, and Olive Payne, at Horace's Head, in Round Court, both in the Strand, MDCCXXXV. [1735]
- The history of England, by M. Rapin de Thoyras, continued, from the abdication of King James II, to the accession of His late Majesty K. George I. By Thomas Lediard, Gent. Late Secretary to His Majesty's Envoy Extraordinary in Lower Germany. Vol.III. London: printed by and for, the sole proprietor, J. Mechell, at the King's-Arms, next the Leg Tavern, in Fleet-Street, MDCCXXXVI. [1736] (A reimpression of books XXV-XXVII from vol.3 by Thomas Lediard of Rapin-Thoyras's 'The history of England' published by James Mechell, 1732–37, with altered pagination and register and separate titlepage.)
- The life of John, Duke of Marlborough, Prince of the Roman Empire; Illustrated with Maps, Plans of Battles, Sieges, and Medals, And a great Number of Original Letters and Papers Never before Published. 3 volumes. By Thomas Lediard, Gent. ... London: printed for J. Wilcox, against the New Church in the Strand, MDCCXXXVI. [1736] Another edition London: printed for J. Wilcox, against the New Church in the Strand; and T. Osborne in Gray's-Inn, MDCCXXXVI. [1736] Also, a second edition in two volumes "With considerable additional improvements." By Thomas Lediard, Esq; F. R. S. ... London : printed for J. Wilcox, against the New Church in the Strand, MDCCXLIII. [1743]
- Dictionarium Britannicum: or a more compleat universal etymological English dictionary than any extant. Containing not only the words and their explication; but their etymologies from the antient British, Teutonick, Dutch Low and High, Old Saxon, German, ... French, Italian, Spanish, Latin, Greek, Hebrew, &c. each in its proper character. Also explaining hard and technical words, or terms of art, in all the arts, sciences, and mysteries following. Together with accents directing to their proper pronuntiation, shewing both the orthography, and orthoepia of the English tongue, viz. in agriculture, algebra, anatomy, architecture, ... hawking, heraldry, horsemanship, hunting, husbandry, hydraulicks, ... surveying, theology, and trigonometry. Illustrated with near five hundred cuts, for giving a clear idea of those figures, not so well apprehended by verbal description. Likewise a collection and explanation of English proverbs; also of words and phrases us'd in our ancient charters, ... and processes at law. Also the iconology, mythology, ... and theology of the Egyptians, Greeks, Romans, &c. being an account of their deities, solemnities, ... and many other curious matters, necessary to be understood, especially by the readers of English poetry. To which is added, a collection of proper names of persons and places in Great-Britain, &c. with their etymologies and explications. The whole digested into an alphabetical order, not only for the information of the ignorant, but the entertainment of the curious; and also the benefit of artificers, tradesmen, young students and foreigners. A work useful for such as would understand what they read and hear, speak what they mean, and write true English. The second edition with numerous additions and improvements. By N. Bailey, philologos. Assisted in the mathematical part by G. Gordon; in the botanical by P. Miller; and in the etymological, &c. by T. Lediard, Gent. professor of the modern languages in Lower Germany. London: printed for T. Cox, at the Lamb under the Royal-Exchange, M,DCC,XXXVI. [1736]
- The German spy. In familiar letters from Munster, Paderborn, Osnabrug, Minden, ... Written by a gentleman on his travels thro Germany, ... with a prefatory account of these letters, and explanatory notes, by Thomas Lediard, Esq, London: printed for J. Mechell, and J. Bailey, 1738.
- Some observations on the scheme, offered by Messrs. Cotton and Lediard, for opening the streets and passages to and from the intended bridge at Westminster. In a letter from one of the Commissioners for Building the said Bridge, to Mr. Lediard, and his answer. With the scheme and plan prefix'd: to which is added, a plan of the lower parts of the parishes of St. Margaret and St. John the Evangelist, from the Horse-Ferry to White-Hall; Wherein several farther Improvements are delineated, and a Proposal for Establishing a Perpetual Fund, to defray the Expences of Paving, Watching, and Lighting the said Bridge, and keeping it in Repair. By Thomas Lediard, Esq. London: printed for John Brett and Ruth Charlton, at the Golden Ball over against St. Clement's Church, and at the Sun in Westminster Hall; and to be had of the booksellers of London and Westminster, [1738]
- The history of the ancient Germans; including that of the Cimbri, Suevi, Alemanni, Franks, Saxons, Goths, Vandals, and other ancient northern nations, who overthrew the Roman Empire, and establish'd that of Germany, and most of the kingdoms of Europe. Written originally in high German; and illustrated with notes and quotations, from ancient authors, accounts of monuments, inscriptions, medals, coins, and other antiquities, by Doctor John Jacob Mascou, Aulick Counsellor to the King of Poland, Assessor of the Court of Justice, and Senator of the city of Leipzick, in Saxony. Now translated into English, by Thomas Lediard, Esq; late Secretary to His Majesty's envoy extraordinary in lower Germany. London and Westminster : printed and sold by James Mechell, at the Kings Arms, in Fleet-Street; and to be had at the Translater's House, in Smith's-Square, Westminster; of Innys and near St. Paul's; Wilcox and Payne, in the Strand; Bettesworth and Hitch, in Pater-noster-Row; Curl, in Covent-Garden; Millan, at Whitehall; Willock, in Cornhill; and Brett, in Westminster-Hall, 1738.
- A charge delivered to the grand jury, at the sessions of the peace held for the city and liberty of Westminster, on Wednesday the 16th of October, 1754. By Thomas Lediard, Esq; chairman of the said Sessions. to which is added, the presentment of the grand jury of the philosophical works of the late Right Honourable Henry St John, Lord Viscount Bolingbroke. Published by order of the court, and at the unanimous request of the gentlemen of the grand Jury. London: printed for T. Payne, at the Mews-Gate, in Castle-street, 1754.

== Notes ==
Attribution

This article incorporates text from a publication now in the public domain: Lee, Sidney, ed. (1892). "Lediard, Thomas". Dictionary of National Biography. Vol. 32. London: Smith, Elder & Co.
