= Wilmarsdonk =

Village in Belgium

Coordinates: 51°17′N 4°22′E

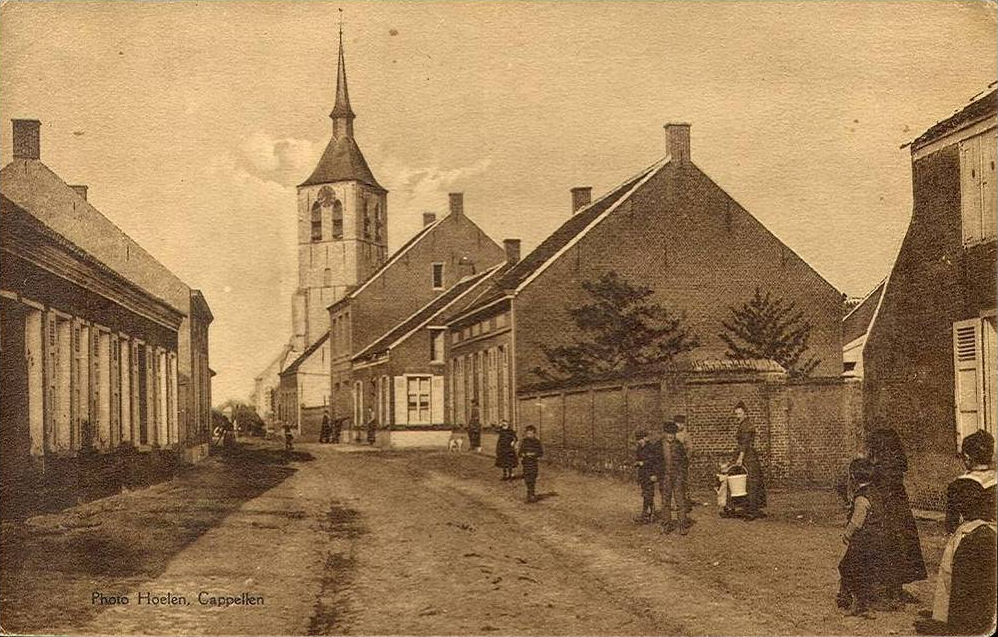
Wilmarsdonk in 1899

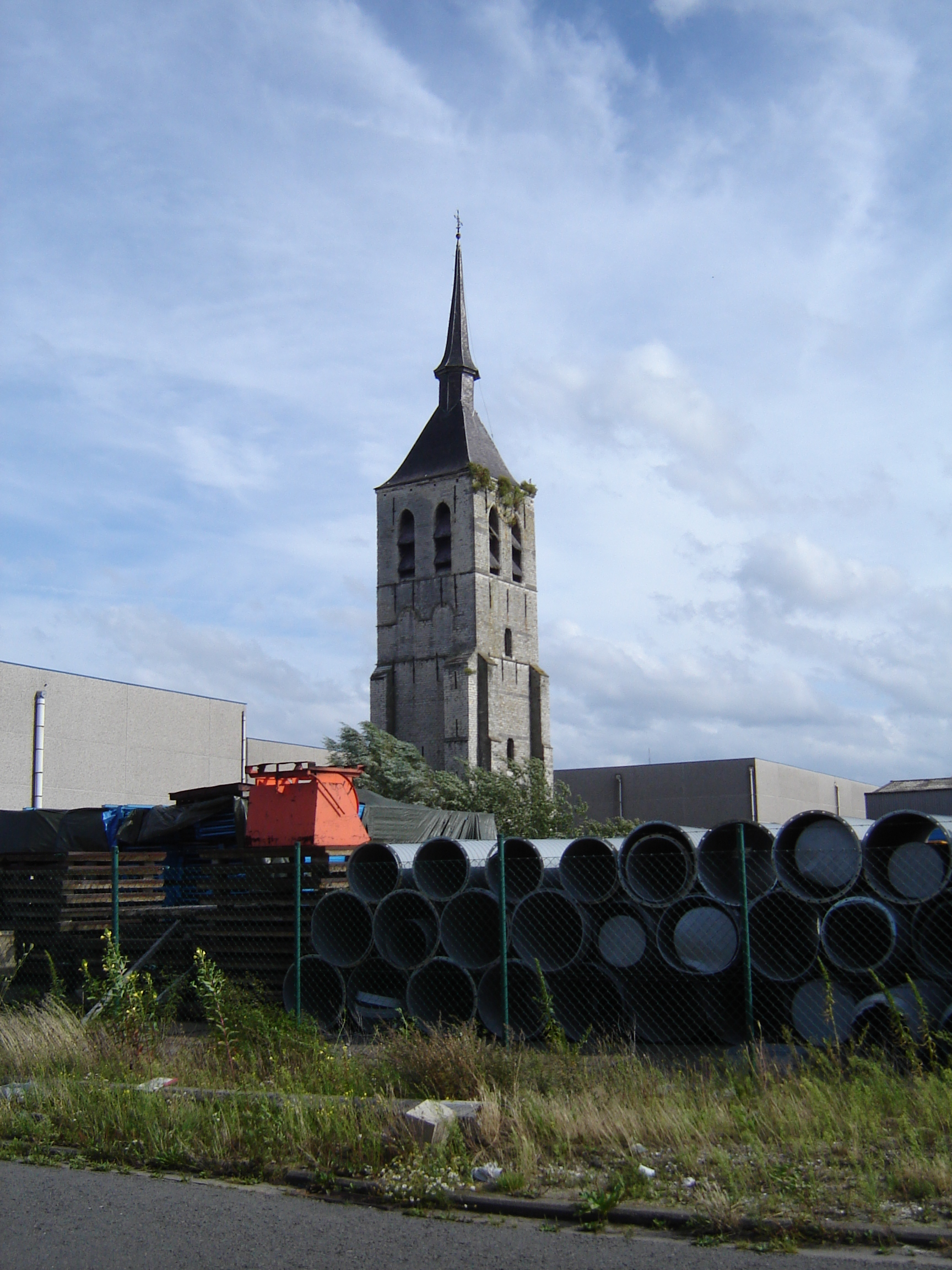
Wilmarsdonk in the Port of Antwerp, 2008

Wilmarsdonk was a village in Belgium, north of Antwerp, which has disappeared under the Port of Antwerp expansion.

The village was first mentioned in 1155 and merged into the city of Antwerp in 1927.

The village was sacrificed to the expansion of the harbor and destroyed in 1965. Only the church tower was preserved.
