= Jobst von Scholten =

Dano-Norwegian Army officer and engineer (1647–1721)

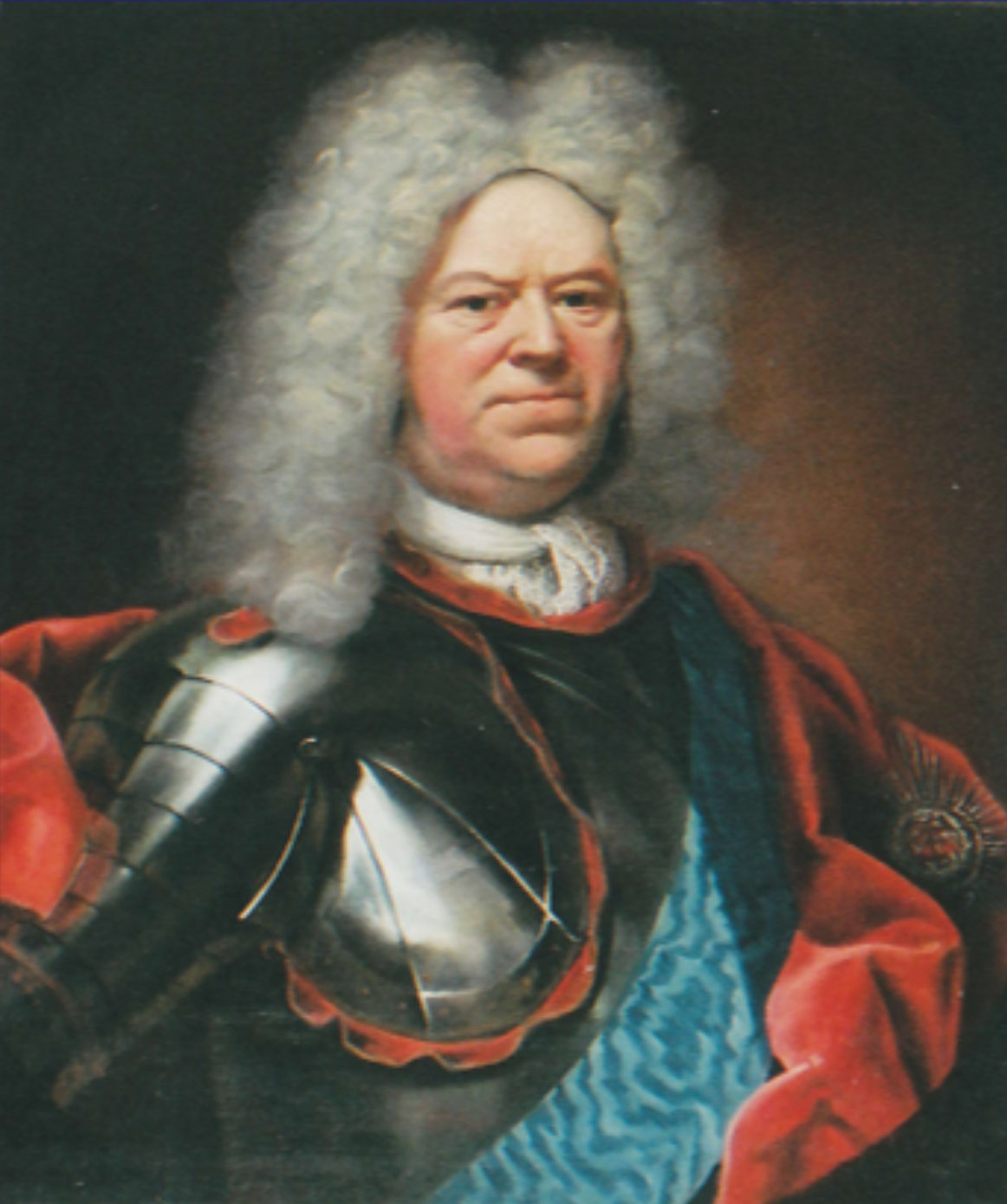
- Portrait of Jobst von Scholten, by Johann Salomon Wahl
- Born: 1647; Amsterdam, Dutch Republic
- Died: 7 November 1721 (aged 73–74); Copenhagen, Denmark-Norway
- Spouses: Adelgunde Mechtilde Rømeling (m. 1673; died 1714) Charlotte Amalie von Plessen (m. 1714)
- Military career
- Branch: Royal Danish Army
- Service years: c. 1661–1721
- Rank: General af Infanteriet
- Conflicts: Scanian War; Siege of Wismar; Siege of Malmö; Siege of Bohus fortress; Siege of Helsingborg (Note: Belägringen av Helsingborg); Siege of Hamburg (Note: Belagerung Hamburgs (1686)); Bombardment of Ratzeburg; War of Spanish Succession; Capture of Liége; Siege of Huy; Battle of Blenheim; Crossing of the Lines of Brabant; Battle of Ramillies; Capture of Oudenarde; Siege of Menin; Great Northern War; Siege of Tönning; Siege of Stralsund (1711) (Note: Belagerung von Stralsund (1711)); Siege of Stade (Note: Belagerung von Stade (1712)); Battle of Gadebusch; Siege of Tönning (1713) (Note: Belagerung von Tönning (1713)); Siege of Stralsund (1715) (Note: Belagerung von Stralsund (1715))
- Awards: Order of the Dannebrog

Jobst von Scholten (c. 1647 – 7 November 1721) was a Royal Dano-Norwegian Army officer and engineer.

== Arrival in Denmark ==
Jobst von Scholten's family hailed from the County of Tecklenburg in Westphalia, but Scholten's father, Heinrich Scholten, had emigrated to Holland. Heinrich Scholten became a public official in Amsterdam and joined the ranks of the city's patricians. Scholten's exact birth year has been disputed, but historians often cite the year 1647. A lot of evidence points to Heinrich Scholten being an acquaintance of Henrik Rüse, perhaps being tied to him through family. Rüse would be called to Denmark at the behest of Frederick III in 1661 in order to improve and expand the kingdom's fortifications after the destructive Second Northern War. It is likely that Scholten was in Rüse's cortege of officers and followed him to Denmark. He is said to have served in the Danish Army since the age of 14, which, if he was born in 1647, would correspond with him going into the King of Denmark's service in the same year as Rüse.

Scholten was enlisted as fähnrich in Rüses Regiment prior to 1670. In 1672, he was promoted to lieutenant in that same regiment, and in 1673 he made captain.

== Early Career as a Fortifications Engineer ==
Despite these infantry commissions, Scholten's profession and speciality was and remained as a military engineer. He was trained by Ruse, and he had sought further education in his native Netherlands as well as in Brandenburg. After his homecoming to Denmark he first received a post as konduktør. This was the equivalent of the rank of lieutenant amongst the small throng of engineers then employed in Danish service. There was no unified corps of engineers at this time in Denmark, nor any corps that consolidated the engineers in the King's service. A young engineer like Scholten instead conducted himself in a system where engineers fell directly under the general staff's control. The engineers usually sorted under the command of either the Quartermaster General of Denmark or the Quartermaster General of Holstein, who also held jurisdiction over the Duchy of Schleswig and the Duchy of Holstein, and also over the County of Oldenburg and the County of Delmenhorst. Yet Rüse had been appointed to the position of quartermaster general of all the realm's fortifications, and over-inspector of the same. Scholten would therefore serve directly under his mentor at the construction, repairment, remodelling and improvement of fortifications in Schleswig, Holstein and Denmark proper. In 1673 he became the leading engineer at Rüse's remodelling of the most important fortification in the duchies: the fortress city of Rendsburg in Schleswig.

In the Scanian War, he also served both as an engineer and as an infantry officer. Scholten's career can only be followed with complete certainty after his transfer to the Royal Life Guard in 1676, but it is likely that the officer at Wismar by the name of Captain Schultz is indeed identical with Scholten.

The campaign of the Danish Army in that war opened with an attack on the Swedish enclave of Wismar in 1675. Christian V's front prepared for this main event by sapping its way towards the fortress walls under the guidance of the engineers, Scholten included - if we assume Captain Schultz to be Scholten. Wismar was assaulted on 13 December, and the Swedish garrison was forced to capitulate, but Scholten was injured because of a fall.

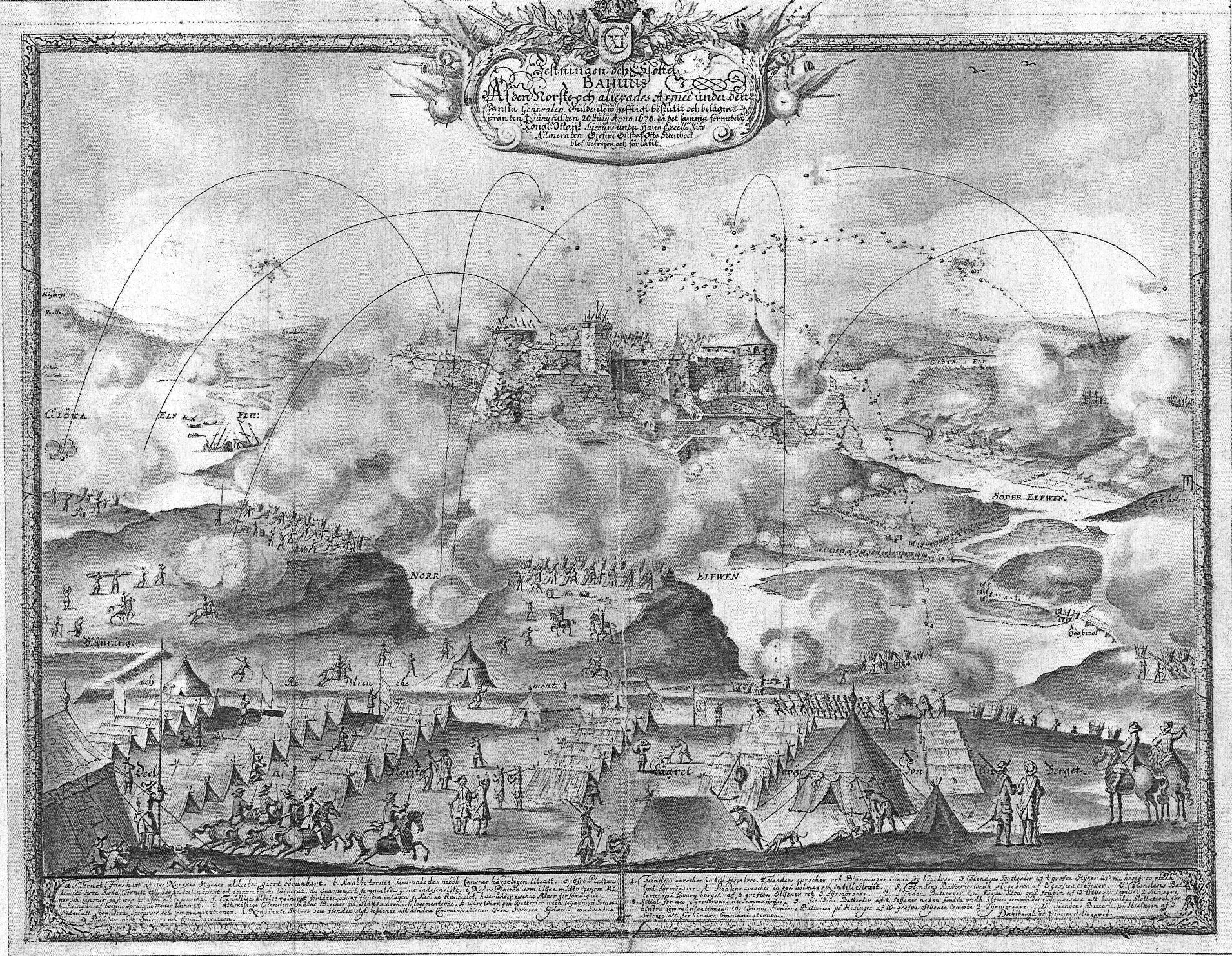
The bombardment of Bohus Fortress by Ulrik Frederik Gyldenløve's army of 15,000 men.

He spent that year 1676 back in the country of his birth, where he had been sent in order to hire more engineers for the army. He is listed as having the rank of major in the Royal Life Guard on 14 February 1677. He was wounded again during the Siege of Malmö in 1677. He was very soon after promoted to lieutenant colonel. In October of 1677, he led the fortifying efforts at Landskrona, a Danish strongpoint in Scania as well as the base of operation for the Danish guerillas known as snaphaner by the Swedes. In December he travelled to Holland again with orders to recruit more engineers. In 1678 Scholten received command of the Life Guard. As the leader of this elite regiment he was included in the Danish expeditionary force consisting of 6,000 men, which was sent to Norway in order to support the Norwegian regiments in the up-coming invasion of Bohuslen. Scholten was under the immediate command of a lieutenant general by the name of Giese, while the commander-in-chief of the whole invasion force was Ulrik Frederik Gyldenløve. Later that year he partook in the relief of Helsingborg from a Swedish siege.

In 1679, the war ended with the Treaty of Lund. Scholten was promoted to colonel and became commandant of Rendsburg. In 1680, he drew up the street-plan for a fortress town in the County of Oldenburg, the ancestral land of the House of Oldenburg, which the senior Danish branch had inherited in 1667. This fortress, named Christiansburg, (Note: Christiansburg (Varel)) would be completed in 1682. Scholten was also likely the man who had chosen its location at Varel near the Jade. The fortress was said to be well-made, but already in 1693 it was decreed that it was to be demolished.

== Fortress Inspector in Schleswig and Holstein ==
In 1682, the same year as Christiansburg was completed, Scholten became chief of Dronningens Livregiment in Glückstadt. On 6 November Christian V organised the engineers of the Danish Army into the Danish Fortifications Service (Note: Ingeniørkorpset) and the Holsteiner Fortifications Service. The first quartermaster general in charge of the Holsteiner Fortifications Service, Wolfgang William Romer, fell out of favour with the King for having hired unsuitable foreign officers for the new service, and Scholten took over as inspector-in-chief of the engineers and fortresses in Schleswig, Holstein, Oldenburg and Delmenhorst in the fall of 1685.

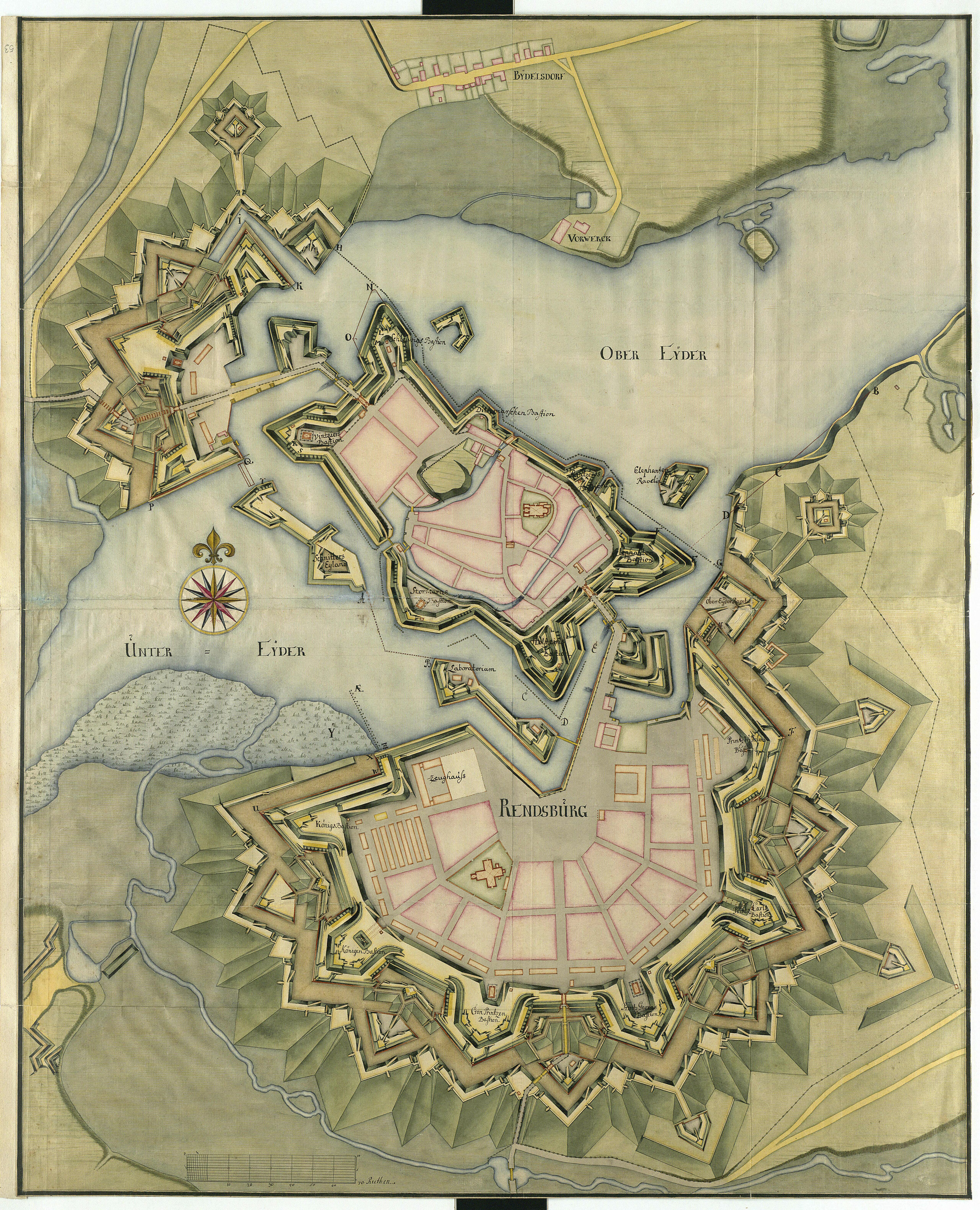
A map of Rendsburg in the early 1700s. The Altstadt can be seen in the middle of the river Eider. Scholten's large Nyværk lies on the southern bank of the Eider, and his Kronværk is situated north of the Altstadt, on the opposing river bank.

Scholten took on the task of strengthening Rendsburg, the realm's second most important fortress behind Copenhagen. Rendsburg's defensive works were at this time concentrated around Slotsholmen, a redoubt in the middle of the Eider, today known as Altstadt. Rendsburg had come in to disrepair after two successful sieges by the forces of the Austrian Wallenstein in 1627 and the Swedish Torstensson in 1643, as well as two sieges where the fortress had held out; a siege by the Swedish commander Wrangel in 1645 and another Swedish siege between 1657 and 1660. It was therefore a ravaged fortress that Rüse had been tasked with rebuilding and repairing in 1669, a task in which Scholten had worked for Rüse as his protegé, as mentioned above. Rüse had lengthened the city walls back then, so that the castle and the walls became one single, integrated fortress. Scholten's rework would be much more ambitious, however.

In 1684, he would begin expanding Rendsburg's fortified works south. Here he established the new citadel Nyværk. This defensive complex was built in the typical modern style of the age of Vauban, sporting a grand central parade ground with radial streets emanating from it. Those streets lead out to the walls of the polygon-shaped citadel. This citadel had six bastions, as well as ravelins and other outer defensive barriers. Nyværk itself was larger than the entirety of Rendsburg's old fortifications, and stretching south it went beyond the borders of Schleswig and down into Holstein. Between 1690 and 1695 Scholten furthermore expanded the city's fortifications north with the new Kronværk, placing it where a small village on the northern Eider bank had lied previously. The Kronværk was smaller than the Nyværk, and it also had both ravelins and other defensive works guarding its walls. Scholten made Rendsburg into the most modern fortress in the realm, and the only other fortress classed as 'first class' other than Copenhagen.

Scholten also designed Kronborg's Kronværk. Kronborg's Kronværk consisted of three bastions shaped like a crown, hence the name. Kronborg's Kronværk was built between 1689 and 1690. Scholten would continue to expand Kronborg's fortifications, and one of Kronborg's ravelins was named Scholtens Ravelin in his honour. Scholten is mentioned in several sources as carrying out his assignments as a fortification engineer with great skill. He was promoted to brigadier in 1687 and in 1690 he became major general, taking leave of his role as colonel-in-chief of his regiment.

== Campaigns on the Southern Border ==
Scholten led the establishment of field fortifications and the siegeworks in many of the smaller feuds that were fought at Denmark's southern border in the last decades of the 17th century. He did this together with one of Rüse's other students, Andreas Fuchs.

Christian V moved with an army towards Hamburg in August of 1686 to force the affluent merchant city to swear fealty to him as their sovereign and hereditary monarch. Scholten took part in the ensuring Siege of Hamburg. (Note: Belagerung Hamburgs (1686))

In 1693, Denmark's alliance with France compelled Denmark to attack and bombard Ratzeburg. During the Bombardment of Ratzeburg Scholten also served as a military engineer. He also took part in the conquest of the Gottorper redoubts at Stapelholm and on Ejdersted in 1697, a prelude to the Great Northern War.

Denmark opened the Great Northern War in 1700 by launching a military campaign against Holstein-Gottorp. Scholten, still commanding the Holsteiner Fortifications Service, led the engineers under Overgeneral Ferdinand Vilhelm. The Danish army split into two columns, and Scholten followed Ferdinand Vilhelm's column on its advance on Husum and then towards Friedrichstadt. The Gottorpers were determined to make a stand at the redoubt defending Husum, and Scholten started construction sapping trenches on 8 April. He also directed the arrangement of siege batteries, which ultimately forced the Gottorpers to retreat on 12 April. The column quickly took Friedrichstadt, and proceeded on to Tønning, where Ferdinand Vilhelm and Fuchs convened to surround the Gottorpers. The siege started after weeks of bombardment and preparations on the night to 15 May, and Scholten now led the sapworks in unison with two other engineers, Fuchs being one of them. Scholten followed the army when it broke up from the siege following the entry of a combined Swedish-Dutch-Lüneburger army into Holstein. Scholten's last act during this early phase of the war was to assume command of some 600 peasants that were conscripted on King Frederick IV's orders.

== War of the Spanish Succession ==
Scholten became inspector of the infantry regiments in the duchies after the Treaty of Traventhal on 18 August 1700. In 1701 he was made lieutenant general. A few months later the War of Spanish Succession broke out, and Scholten was appointed second-in-command of the Danish Auxiliary Corps in Anglo-Dutch service.

His first reported feat during this war was the capture of Weert. Scholten was dispatched towards this town on 14 August 1702 with four battalions and 700 men of cavalry. The approximately 135-strong French garrison defended only the castle, but abandoned that too after two days, after obtaining free passage to Roermond. The castle of Weert was destroyed by artillery fire and Scholten lost only 6 men in the capture of the town. Later that same year, he commanded operations in the trenches at the capture of Liège in collaboration with the Hereditary Prince of Hesse-Kassel, later King of Sweden and George of Hanover, later King of Britain.

In the 1703 campaign, a fierce discussion took place among the allied generals in August. The Duke of Marborough, dissatisfied with the gains made that year, hoped to be allowed to plan an attack on the fortified French lines defending Brabant. However, his proposal divided the council of war. The generals of the right wing of the army, including Scholten and the most senior Danish commander, the Duke of Württemberg, supported Marlborough. However, the left wing consisting mainly of Dutch generals, such as Nassau-Ouwerkerk, Dopff and Albemarle, but also, for example, the Dane Jørgen Rantzau, was strongly opposed to they plan. The officers of the small army under General Slangenburg also opposed the plan. Strong opposition and the fact that some of Marlborough's original supporters, such as Scholten, cooled in their zeal ultimately meant that the Dutch field deputies did not feel able to give Marlborough permission to attack the French lines.

In May 1704, Scholten was sent by Nassau-Ouwerkerk with a detachment, 8 battalions and 21 squadrons strong, all Danish, to Marlborough's army in the Moselle. Initially, only part of the force was to consist of Danes, but after objections from the Danish commanders about 'separating' their troops, efforts were made to send as many Danes as possible with them. This meant he would participate in the Battle of Blenheim that took place later that year. He also participated in various operations in Germany after that battle.

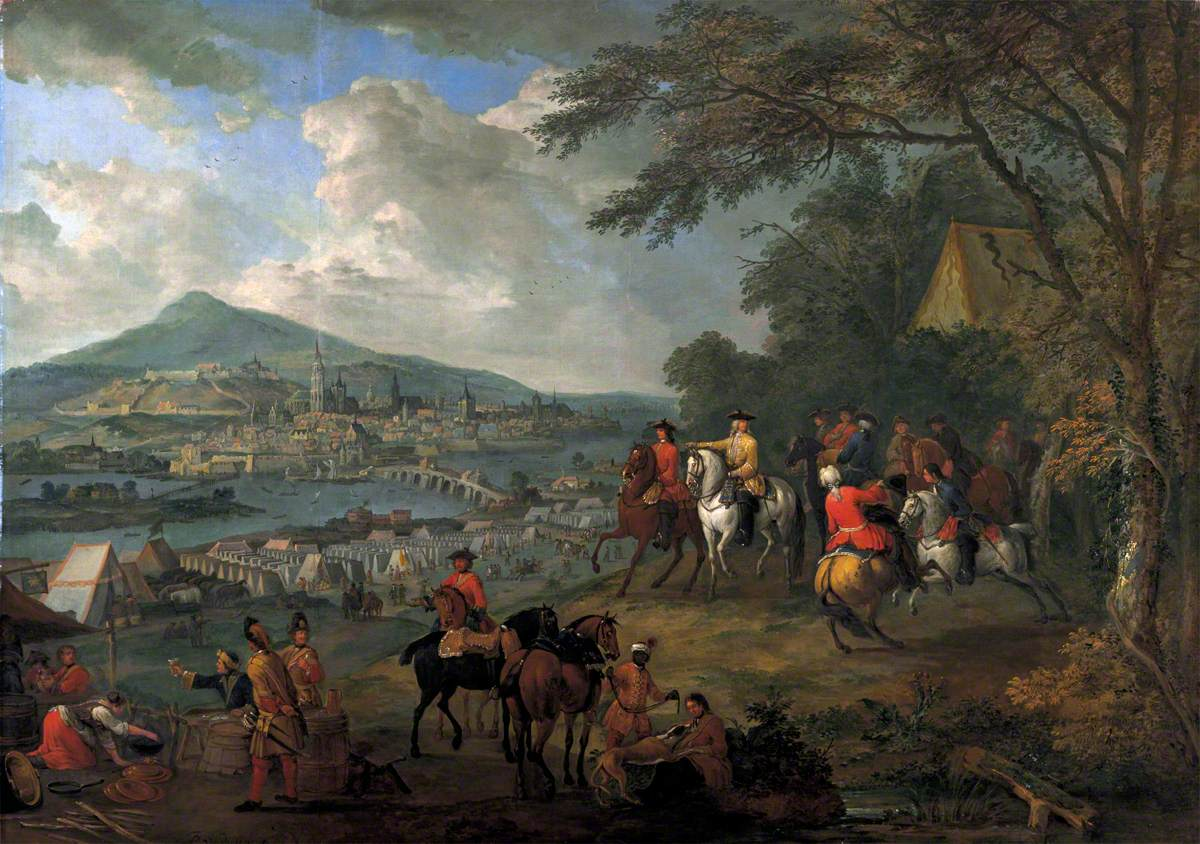
The Assault on the Town of Oudenaarde, by Jan Peeter Verdussen.

In July 1705, Scholten was sent to Huy with 12 battalions and 10 squadrons to invest that town, covered by the army under Nassau-Ouwerkerk. The city had been recaptured by the French earlier that year. The city and, a little later, the castle were taken relatively quickly, in less than 3 days. The garrison of 550 men were taken as prisoners of war. However, Scholten seems to have overstepped his powers here by concluding a capitulation without the field deputies. Marlborough, in a letter, later advised Scholten to apologise, as he believed the field deputies and Nassau-Ouwerkerk were displeased by his action. Later that year, at the eve of the Battle of Elixheim, he led Noyelles' right-wing column, which broke through the lines at Over- and Nederhespen without a fight.

During Battle of Ramillies, in 1706, Scholten led the first attack on the village of Ramillies. At the head of 12 Dutch, British, German, Swiss and Danish battalions, he managed to capture the village without much difficulty. A counterattack by d'Artagnan was temporarily successful, but with the arrival of fresh Allied troops, the village again fell into Allied hands. At the capture of Oudenaarde, later that year, it was the arrival of Scholten and his troops that made the governor of that city decide to surrender. Under the command of Ernst Wilhelm von Salisch, Scholten took part in the Siege of Menin. Together with the Earl of Orkney, he led the allied infantry during the siege. His regiment also took part in the Siege of Ostend.

== Overgeneral in Great Northern War ==
Scholten retired to Amsterdam in 1708. Scholten had amassed a large fortune that he was able to live off of. The next year Denmark involved itself in the Great Northern War once again. The first major action of the Danes in this rematch was the crushing defeat at the Battle of Helsingborg. Overgeneral Jørgen Rantzau had been severely wounded, and a new overgeneral - that is to say head of the army - had to be found. Scholten was chosen due to a variety of factors. Firstly, his 40 years of service in Denmark, and the fact that he had only ever served Denmark, meant that he had an intricate knowledge of the affairs of the Danish Army. Secondly, the war was moving into a phase were battles would be rare and sieges would be common, so Scholten's engineering expertise would be needed. Thirdly, Scholten was known for being a good administrator and very good with money, and that was sorely needed now that the army had to be rebuilt from the ruins that the defeat at Helsingborg had left it in. Fourthly, Bendix Meyer, (Note: Bendix Meyer) who had served on Scholten's staff in the War of Spanish Succession and who was engaged to his daughter, recommended him, and this recommendation carried a great deal of weight.

Scholten took over command of the army from the acting overgeneral, Franz Joachim von Dewitz, (Note: Franz Joachim von Dewitz) on 20 June 1710. Dewitz and Scholten would continue to work very closely together for the rest of the war, right up until Dewitz's death in 1719. They formed a capable team - almost always in agreement, and with complete mutual loyalty and support towards each other.

Scholten's first task was rebuilding the Danish Army. New equipment, muskets and horses were bought abroad to replace all the equipment lost during the 1709-1710 campaign in Scania. Peasants and townsmen were conscripted into the army in order to replace the soldiers lost at Helsingborg. The Danish reconstruction efforts were a success, and in the late summer of 1711, Scholten could take his place at the head of an army of 30,100 men in Holstein. Scholten and his staff broke up from Holstein and marched onwards into Mecklenburg with the intent of sieging down Swedish Wismar. Yet this plan was abandoned when August the Strong coerced Frederick IV into taking on Stralsund first, otherwise August would return with his troops to Saxony. Scholten firmly opposed this plan, but Frederick IV nonetheless gave in, and Scholten had to take to his bed for some days after getting kicked by August's horse. The attempt to take Stralsund in 1711 would fail due to the inability of the Danish Navy to transport the necessary siege artillery to Pomerania that autumn.

In February 1712, Scholten suggested of King Frederick that a commission be set-up to decide the plans for the coming campaign season. It was decided that the first priority of the Danish war effort should be to invade and occupy the Swedish province of Bremen-Verden. On 31 July, Scholten would therefore cross the Elbe into the Swedish province with an army of 13,500 men. On 7 August, the first Danish column reached Stade, the only major fortress in the Swedish province. Scholten had held the city besieged, and he conducted the siege by sapping his front closer and closer towards the Swedish walls at night. Scholten had 90 artillery pieces with him, and on August 29 he opened a week-long bombardment of the city. The bombardment was very heavy, and on 7 September, Stade with its garrison was forced to surrender. Scholten was appointed as Governor-General of Bremen-Verden by Frederick IV following this victory, though the everyday running of the province's affairs would be managed by a corps of Danish bureaucrats. Scholten then led the army to Hamburg on the orders of the King. Here it pressured the Hamburgers to pay 246,000 Danish rigsdaler to Denmark. Scholten seemingly did not concern himself with the coalition's strive to take Stralsund in 1712.

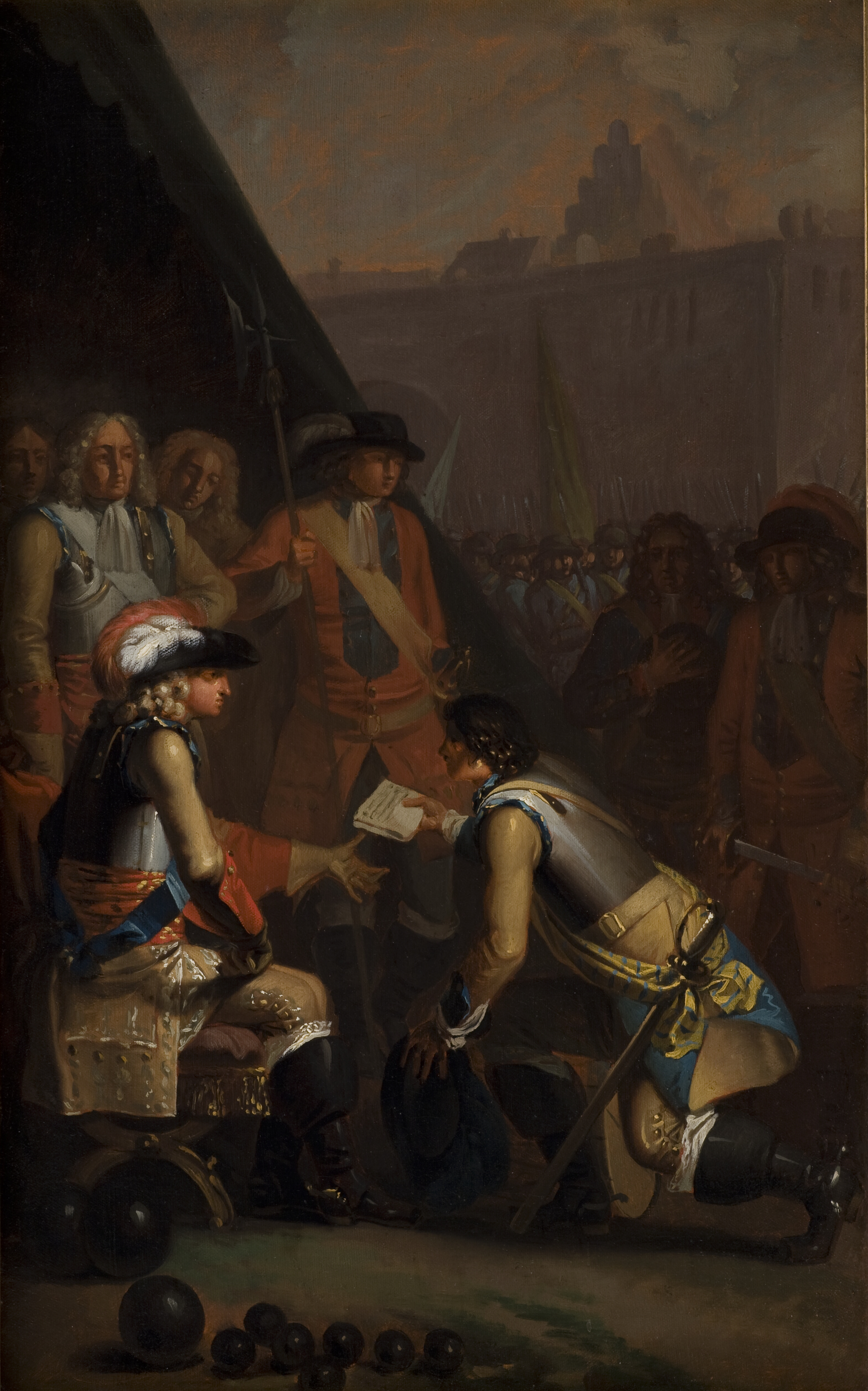
Magnus Stenbock Surrenders the Fortress of Tønning to Frederick IV, a sketch for a painting that burned in 1794 by Nicolai Abildgaard. The figure immediately behind Frederick IV is likely Scholten.

The Battle of Gadebusch on December 12, 1712, would be the first and only time that Scholten served as overall commander of an army in a pitched battle. Scholten's battle orders prior to the battle were criticised by both his own officers as well as the leading generals of the 3,500 strong Saxon cavalry force that reinforced the Danes just before to the battle. Scholten was ordered to change the order of battle by Frederick IV when the Saxon general Jacob Heinrich von Flemming went against him. But the discussion had gone on for so long that it was now morning, and the Swedes attacked just as the Danish and Saxon lines were reorganising, thus creating a great deal of confusion amongst the allied ranks. Scholten sensed disaster, and he felt forced to ride over to the left flank in an attempt to stop the Saxon squadrons from fleeing. This left the Danes without an overall commander for some time. The battle ended in a defeat, and the Danish army retreated in good, but shattered order. Scholten himself retreated to the town of Ziethen, where he found groups of soldiers were coming in. Scholten then reunited with the King in Oldesloe in Holstein.

News reached the Danish camp on 29 December 1712 that the victorious Swedes were crossing the Trave into Holstein. Scholten went to Hamburg while the King with the Danish army retreated northwards to Flensburg and further towards Fredericia. Scholten was not alone here, sharing the city with the leader of the Saxon forces in Northern Germany, Jacob Heinrich von Flemming, as well as the Swedish theater commander in Northern Germany, Mauritz von Vellingk. Scholten and Flemming feuded with Vellingk over the Burning of Altona (Note: Einäscherung von Altona) during their time in the port city, and they would also convince Czar Peter to continue his pursuit of Stenbock. Scholten was back in command as the allied armies closed in on Western Schleswig, where Stenbock had sought refuge, although under the immediate command of his monarch and commander-in-chief Frederick IV, just like at Gadebusch. Stenbock would seek protection inside the fortress of Tønning, and as the fortress came under siege by the allied armies, it would once again fall to Scholten to conduct the siege operations. Scholten was present for Stenbock's surrender to Frederick IV at Hoyerswort on 20 May 1713. On 8 February 1714, the fortress of Tønning itself was surrendered to Scholten's besieging force of 8 Danish battalions and 8 Danish squadrons.

Scholten would lead an excellently trained and equipped Danish army of 30,000 men into Swedish Pomerania in 1715, and here he would lead the Danish efforts during the Siege of Stralsund. In 1716, Scholten drew up the plans for the intended Dano-Russian invasion of Scania, but drew Czar Peter's ire in the process. Scholten's plans were built on his experience from the Scanian War, but Peter found it too late in the season and Scholten too old. The Russians abandoned the project on 19 September, two days prior to the planned launch.

Scholten's age was no doubt beginning to show. He showed very little energy in the last years of the war. In 1717, he was very sceptical of any and all preparations for an offensive into Sweden. In 1718, he refused to go to Norway to inspect the defenses there because of his advanced age. Scholten was duly considered unfit for service in the field in 1719, when the Danes prepared for a campaign into Bohuslen. King Frederick instead tried unsuccessfully to hire Franconian Feldmarschallleutnant Seckendorff for the task.

Scholten would spend his last years handling the army's administrative affairs as First Deputy of the Generalkommissariat. He would become Governor-General of the Danish Pomerania upon the death of Dewitz in 1719. Scholten would continue to serve as overgeneral and first deputy until his death in 1721.

== Family ==
Scholten was the progenitor of the von Scholten-family in Denmark. His son, Henrik von Scholten, (Note: Henrik von Scholten) was an officer like his father, and served in his father's campaigns in both the War of Spanish Succession and the Great Northern War, being wounded at the Battle of Malplaquet. Henrik would himself be promoted to general. Jobst von Scholten's great great grandson was Peter von Scholten.

== Sources ==
- Andersen, Dan H. (2021a). Store Nordiske Krig. Bind I. 1700-1710 - Store Planer (in Danish) (1 ed.). Copenhagen: Politikens Forlag.
- Andersen, Dan H. (2021b). Store Nordiske Krig. Bind II. 1710-1721 - Triumf og Tragedie (in Danish) (1 ed.). Copenhagen: Politikens Forlag.
- Bjerg, Hans Christian; Frantzen, Ole L. (2005). Danmark I Krig (in Danish) (1 ed.). Copenhagen: Politikens Forlag.
- Dansk Adelsforening (1960). Danmarks Adels Aarbog 1961 (PDF) (in Danish). J. H. Schultz Forlagsboghandel A/S.
- Harbou, H. W. (1887). "Jobst von Scholten". In Bricka, C. F. (ed.). Dansk Biografisk Lexicon - tillige omfattende Norge for Tidsrummet 1537-1814 (in Danish) (1 ed.). Gyldendalske Boghandels Forlag (F. Hegel & Søn).
- Hvass, Lone. "Kronborgs befæstning". Helsingør Leksikon (in Danish).
- Jensen, N. P. (1900). Den Skaanske Krig 1675-1679 (in Danish) (1 ed.). Copenhagen: Det Nordiske Forlag.
- Lorenzen, Vilhelm (1939). "Christiansburg. Et dansk Byanlæg i Oldenburg i 17. Aarhundrede". Historisk Tidsskrift (in Danish) (V/10): 464–475.
- Petersen, Karsten Skjold (2023). Nederlag og Triumf (in Danish) (1 ed.). Copenhagen: Gads Forlag.
- Rockstroh, K. C. (1935). "Hærens Overkommando i to Krige under og to efter Enevælden". Krigsvidenskab.dk (in Danish).
- Rockstroh, K. C. (18 July 2011). "Jobst v. Scholten". Dansk Biografisk Leksikon (in Danish).
- Rockstroh, K. C. (1934). Bidrag til Den Store Nordiske Krigs Historie. Krigens Afslutning. 1719-1720 (in Danish). Copenhagen: Gyldendalske Boghandel Nordisk Forlag.
- Svane, Erik Bondo (1952). "Rendsborg". Sønderjysk Månedsskrift (in Danish) (VII/28): 99–112.
- Tuxen, August (1894). "Overfaldet paa Hamburg 1686". Historisk Tidsskrift (in Danish). IV (6).
- Tuxen, August; Harbou, H. W.; With, C. L. (1910). Bidrag til Den Store Nordiske Krigs Historie. Kong Frederik IV's Første Kamp om Sønderjylland. Krigen 1700 (in Danish). Copenhagen: Det Nordiske Forlag.
- Tuxen, August; With-Seidelin, C. L. (1899). Bidrag til Den Store Nordiske Krigs Historie. De Nordiske Allieredes Kamp med Magnus Stenbock. 1712-1713 (in Danish). Copenhagen: Gyldendalske Boghandel Nordisk Forlag.
- Tuxen, August (1927). Bidrag til Den Store Nordiske Krigs Historie. Karl XII i Norge, Peter I i Danmark. 1716 (in Danish). Copenhagen: Gyldendalske Boghandel Nordisk Forlag.
- Tychsen, V. E. (1884). Fortifikations-Etaterne og Ingeninieurkorpset 1684-1884. Organisatorisk Oversigt, udarbeidet i Anledning af 200-Aarsdagen, den 6te November 1884, for den danske Fortifikations-Etats Oprettelse (in Danish). Copenhagen: Hoffensberg & Traps Etabl.
- Wijn, J.W. (1956). Het Staatsche Leger: Deel VIII-1 Het tijdperk van de Spaanse Successieoorlog 1702–1705 (The Dutch States Army: Part VIII-1 The era of the War of the Spanish Succession 1702–1705) (in Dutch). Martinus Nijhoff.
- Wijn, J.W. (1959). Het Staatsche Leger: Deel VIII-2 Het tijdperk van de Spaanse Successieoorlog 1706–1710 (The Dutch States Army: Part VIII-2 The era of the War of the Spanish Succession 1706–1710) (in Dutch). Martinus Nijhoff.
