= Sophie Flamand =

Belgian writer and journalist (1964–2026)

- Born: 6 November 1964; Liège, Belgium
- Died: 14 April 2026 (aged 61); Ramillies, Belgium
- Education: Université libre de Bruxelles
- Occupations: Writer, journalist

Sophie Flamand (6 November 1964 – 14 April 2026) was a Belgian writer and journalist.

== Early life and career ==
Born in Liège on 6 November 1964, Flamand attended the Université libre de Bruxelles and became deputy director of the cultural center in Woluwe-Saint-Lambert at the request of mayor Georges Désir. She also directed the nonprofit organization "Le pied de la Lettre" until 2009. She notably wrote for magazines such as BoDoï, Casemate, and ActuaBD. In 2003, she hosted an exhibition for the 50th anniversary of the Martine series. She then contributed to the albums L'Album de l'année : bricoler, lire, découvrir, cuisiner, jouer, Mon livre jeux Martine, and Martine visite Bruxelles, published by Casterman, the last of which served as a children's guidebook of Brussels. In 2013, she published Fusion, prefaced by Jean Van Hamme. She then wrote Mission et omissions and La Journée d'une femme, included in the "Opuscule" collection in 2024.

Flamand published a two-part series titled Les Mantes religieuses alongside her husband, Bernard Swynsen, and illustrator Christian Paty. The first installment, L’Évasion de l’araignée, was published in 2022, with the second, La Stratégie de l’araignée in 2023. The series was praised by Zoo magazine.

== Personal life and death ==
Flamand was married to comic book author Bernard Swynsen, with whom she had three daughters: Capucine, Cléo, and Fanny.

Flamand died in Ramillies on 14 April 2026, at the age of 61.
