= List of protected heritage sites in Ramillies, Belgium =

This table shows an overview of the protected heritage sites in the Walloon town Ramillies, Belgium. This list is part of Belgium's national heritage.

Object	Year/architect	Town/section	Address	Coordinates	Number^{?}	Image
Tumulus of Hottomont and surrounding area ^{(nl)} ^{(fr)}		Grand-Rosière-Hottomont		50.622708°N 4.891027°E	25122-CLT-0003-01 Info	Tumulus van Hottomont en omliggende terreinen
Chapel of Saint-Feuillen except the sacristy ^{(nl)} ^{(fr)}		Autre-Eglise	rue de la Gare d'Hédenge et alentours	50.673845°N 4.905753°E	25122-CLT-0004-01 Info	Kapel Saint-Feuillen, uitgezonderd de sacristie
Presbytery Church of Saint-Hubert and outbuildings: facades and roofs, and environment ^{(nl)} ^{(fr)}		Ramillies-Offus	rue du Wayaux (S)	50.636329°N 4.915740°E	25122-CLT-0005-01 Info	
Presbytery: facades and roofs, and surrounding wall ^{(nl)} ^{(fr)}		Autre-Eglise	rue de la Place (M) et alentours (S)	50.663367°N 4.925040°E	25122-CLT-0006-01 Info	Pastorie: gevels en daken, en omliggende muur
Rectory of the church of Saint-symphorien and construction: walls and roofs ^{(nl)} ^{(fr)}		Geest-Gérompont-Petit-Rosière	rue Louis Delvaux (M) et alentours (S)	50.643862°N 4.861066°E	25122-CLT-0007-01 Info	
Notre Dame Church and surroundings ^{(nl)} ^{(fr)}		Autre-Eglise		50.663416°N 4.925578°E	25122-CLT-0008-01 Info	Kerk Notre-Dame en omgeving
Church of Saint-Jean-Baptiste ^{(nl)} ^{(fr)}		Huppaye		50.692198°N 4.892477°E	25122-CLT-0009-01 Info	Kerk Saint-Jean-Baptiste
Church of Saint-André and the cemetery wall and its surroundings ^{(nl)} ^{(fr)}		Mont-Saint-André		50.654902°N 4.863665°E	25122-CLT-0010-01 Info	Kerk Saint-André en de kerkhofmuur en diens omgeving
Church of Saint-Remy and environment ^{(nl)} ^{(fr)}		Geest-Gérompont-Petit-Rosière		50.646967°N 4.880574°E	25122-CLT-0011-01 Info	Kerk Saint-Remy en omgeving
Baptismal font of Molembais ^{(nl)} ^{(fr)}		Ramillies		50.693261°N 4.906369°E	25122-CLT-0012-01 Info	
Church of Notre-Dame du Rosaire ^{(nl)} ^{(fr)}		Bomal		50.668096°N 4.873550°E	25122-CLT-0016-01 Info	Kerk Notre-Dame du Rosaire
Parts of the surrounding area of the Abbaye of Ramée ^{(nl)} ^{(fr)}		Bomal		50.679696°N 4.852983°E	25122-CLT-0018-01 Info	
The presbytery dating from the 17th century ^{(nl)} ^{(fr)}		Bomal		50.668763°N 4.873869°E	25122-CLT-0019-01 Info	De pastorie uit de 17e eeuw
Tumulus of Hottomont, archaeological site ^{(nl)} ^{(fr)}		Ramillies	Grand-Rosière	50.622708°N 4.891027°E	25122-PEX-0001-01 Info	Tumulus van Hottomont, archeologische site

== See also ==
- Lists of protected heritage sites in Walloon Brabant
- Ramillies, Belgium
