= Siege of Menin (1706) =

1706 siege

- Part of War of the Spanish Succession
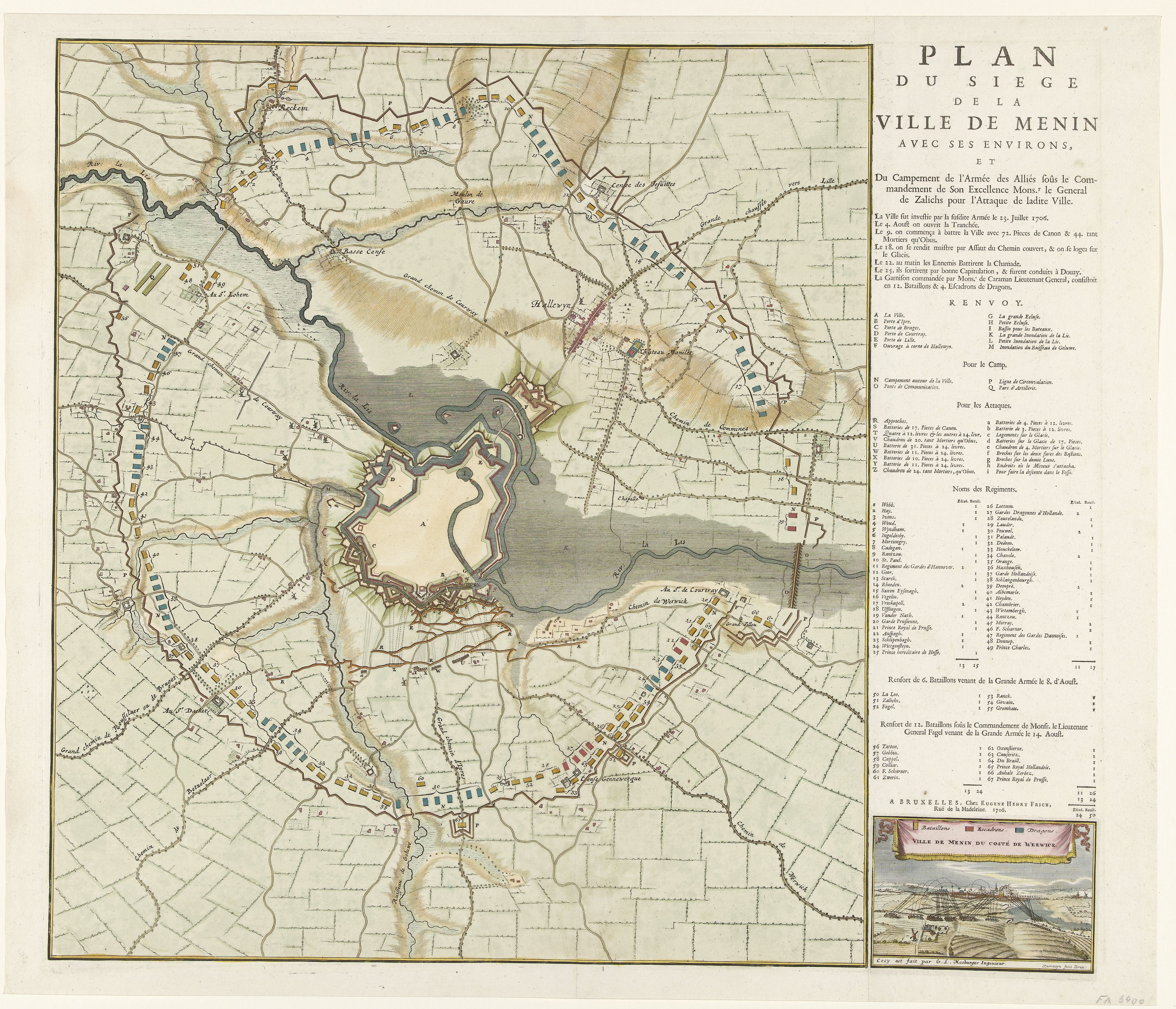
Date	12 July – 22 August 1706
Location	Menen (Menin), Spanish Netherlands 50°48′N 03°07′E
Result	Allied victory

Belligerents
Grand Alliance; Dutch Republic; Scotland	(Kingdom of France) France

Commanders and leaders
(Dutch Republic) Ernst von Salisch; Earl of Orkney (Dutch Republic) Jobst von Scholten	(Kingdom of France) Count de Caraman (Kingdom of France) Marquis de Bully

Strength
30,000 men	5,500 men

Casualties and losses
2,100–3,000 killed or wounded	1,400 killed or wounded

The siege of Menin (1706) was a siege by the Allies against the French during the War of the Spanish Succession.

== Siege ==
In the wake of the Allied victory over the French at the Battle of Ramillies on 23 May 1706, many cities across the Spanish Netherlands rapidly surrendered to the Duke of Marlborough's victorious forces. On 17 June, Kortrijk was occupied, just 11 Kilometer from the French border.

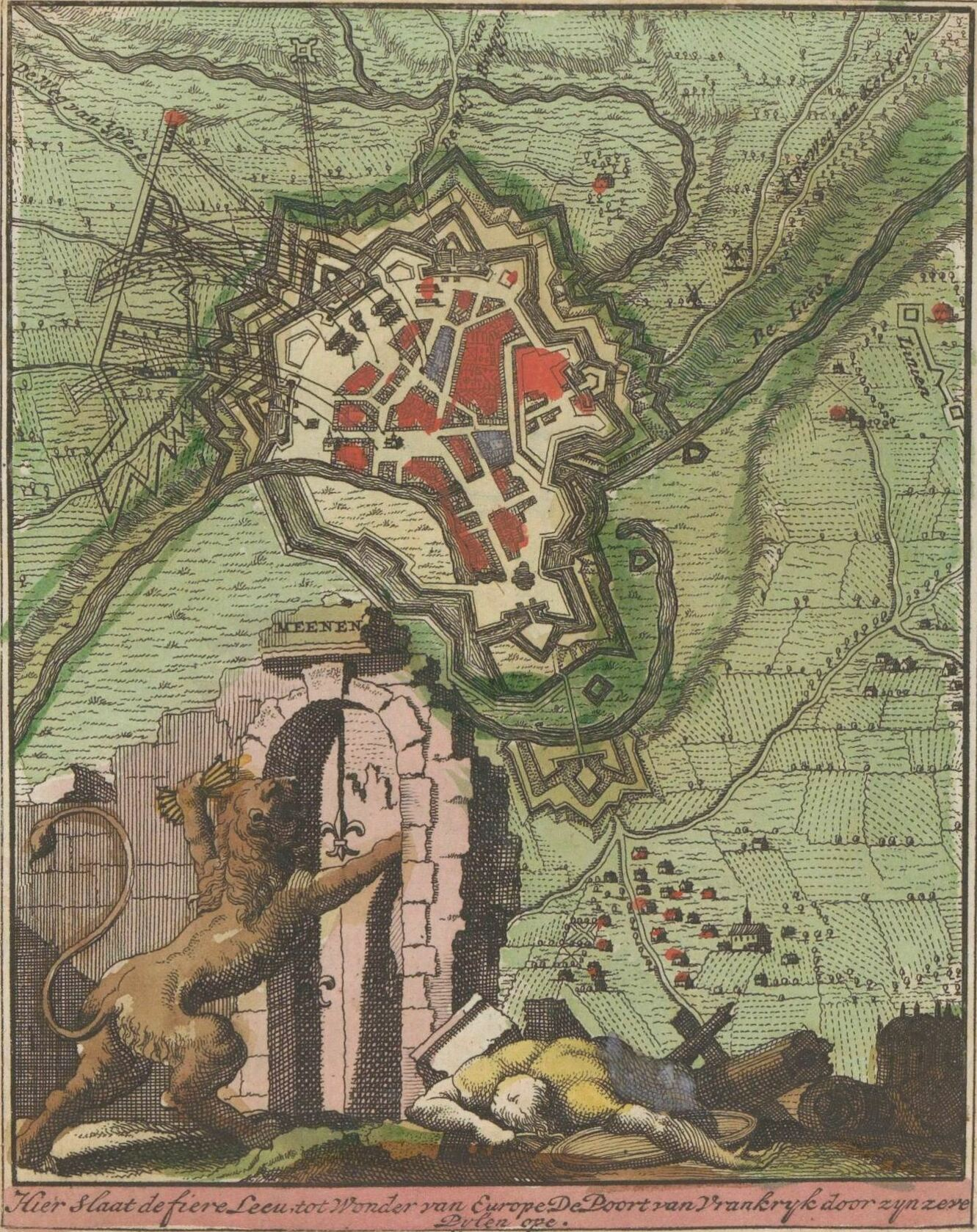
The Dutch Lion opening the gates of France at Menen

Menin had been occupied by the French since 1678 and turned into a formidable fortress by Vauban. The fortress was manned by some 5,000 French soldiers under command of general de Caraman and military governor Louis d'Etendart, Marquis de Bully.

Marlborough detached Dutch and British forces and gave the command to Ernst Wilhelm von Salisch, a Silesian general in Dutch service. Marlborough had originally appointed Englishman Holcroft Blood as the engineer to manage the siege. However, the Dutch could not stomach this as they shouldered the bulk of the expenses for the siege. The Dutch dismissed Blood and instead appointed Guillaume le Vasseur des Rocques and Lucas de Mée to manage the siege.

On 18 July, the enemy was chased from the Counterscarp at a high cost. The next weeks, trenches were dug to the left and the right of the city towards the wall, while the city was constantly bombed. The wall was breached in the morning of 21 August, after which the French commanders asked to negotiate.

The next day, the capitulation was signed, allowing the remaining French troops to leave the city with their arms and flags, and march to Lille and Douai in France. Caraman honoured the Dutch artillerymen and remarked that they were the best in the world.

The damage to the city was enormous. The Sint-Vedastus church, the town hall and the monasteries of the Benedictines and the Capuchins lay in ruins. The Belfort was also partly destroyed. In the fortress the Allies recovered some of the guns they had lost at the Battle of Landen in the previous war.

== Bibliography ==
- Falkner, James. The War of the Spanish Succession 1701-1714. Pen and Sword, 2015.
- Falkner, James (2007). Marlborough's sieges. Spellmount.
- Van Nimwegen, Olaf (2020). De Veertigjarige Oorlog 1672–1712 (in Dutch). Prometheus. ISBN 978-90-446-3871-4.
