= Battle of Ramillies =

1706 battle in the War of the Spanish Succession

- Part of the War of the Spanish Succession
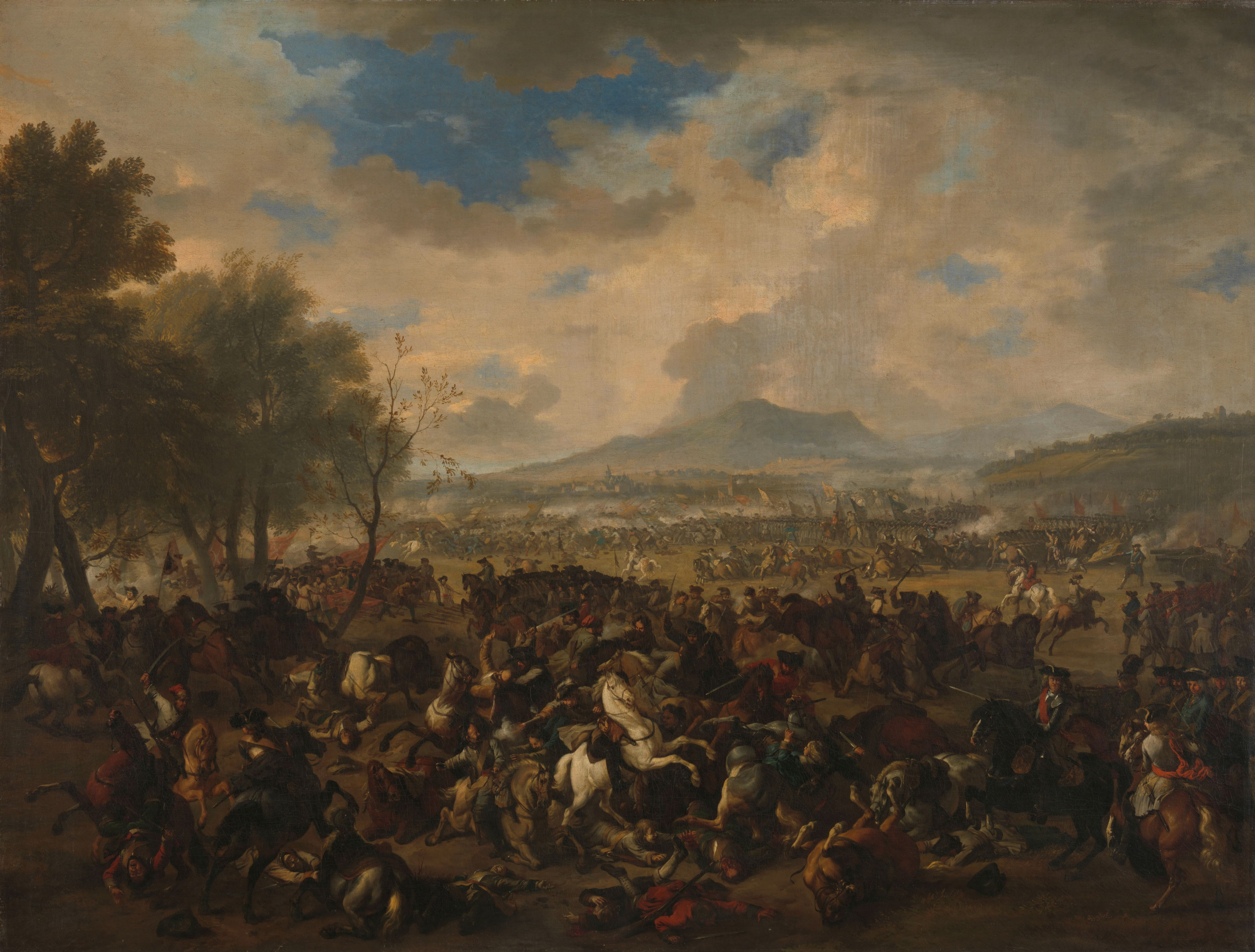
- 1706–1710 painting of the battle
Date	23 May 1706 (Note: All dates in the article are in the Gregorian calendar (unless otherwise stated). The Julian calendar as used in England in 1706 differed by eleven days. Thus, the battle of Ramillies was fought on 23 May (Gregorian calendar) or 12 May (Julian calendar). In this article (O.S) is used to annotate Julian dates with the year adjusted to 1 January. See the article Old Style and New Style dates for a more detailed explanation of the dating issues and conventions.)
Location	Ramillies, Spanish Netherlands 50°38′11″N 4°54′55″E
Result	Anglo-Dutch victory

Belligerents
Dutch Republic; England; Scotland	France; Bavaria; Spain

Commanders and leaders
Duke of Marlborough (Dutch Republic) Lord Overkirk	Duke of Villeroi (Electorate of Bavaria) Maximilian II Emanuel

Strength
62,000	60,000

Casualties and losses
3,663–5,000	13,000–15,000
- Location within Belgium

The Battle of Ramillies (/ˈræmɪliːz/), fought on 23 May 1706, was a battle of the War of the Spanish Succession. For the Grand Alliance – Austria, England, and the Dutch Republic – the battle had followed an indecisive campaign against the Bourbon armies of King Louis XIV of France in 1705. Although the Allies had captured Barcelona that year, they had been forced to abandon their campaign on the Moselle, had stalled in the Spanish Netherlands and suffered defeat in northern Italy. Yet despite his opponents' setbacks Louis XIV wanted peace, but on reasonable terms. Because of this, as well as to maintain their momentum, the French and their allies took the offensive in 1706.

The campaign began well for Louis XIV's generals: in Italy Marshal Vendôme defeated the Austrians at the Battle of Calcinato in April, while in Alsace Marshal Villars forced the Margrave of Baden back across the Rhine. Encouraged by these early gains Louis XIV urged Marshal Villeroi to go over to the offensive in the Spanish Netherlands and, with victory, gain a 'fair' peace. Accordingly, the French Marshal set off from Leuven (Louvain) at the head of 60,000 men and marched towards Tienen (Tirlemont), as if to threaten Zoutleeuw (Léau). Also determined to fight a major engagement, the Duke of Marlborough, commander-in-chief of Anglo-Dutch forces, assembled his army – some 62,000 men – near Maastricht, and marched past Zoutleeuw. With both sides seeking battle, they soon encountered each other on the dry ground between the rivers Mehaigne and Petite Gette, close to the small village of Ramillies.

In less than four hours Marlborough's Dutch, English, and Danish forces (Note: Denmark never joined the Grand Alliance, but Danish troops, hired by the Maritime Powers (England and the Dutch Republic), were central to Allied success both at the Battle of Blenheim in 1704 and at Ramillies in 1706.) overwhelmed Villeroi's and Maximilian II Emanuel's Franco-Spanish-Bavarian army. The Duke's subtle moves and changes in emphasis during the battle – something his opponents failed to realise until it was too late – caught the French in a tactical vice. With their foe broken and routed, the Allies were able to fully exploit their victory. Town after town fell, including Brussels, Bruges and Antwerp; by the end of the campaign Villeroi's army had been driven from most of the Spanish Netherlands. With Prince Eugene's subsequent success at the Battle of Turin in northern Italy, the Allies had imposed the greatest loss of territory and resources that Louis XIV would suffer during the war. Thus, the year 1706 proved, for the Allies, to be an annus mirabilis.

== Background ==
After their disastrous defeat at Blenheim in 1704, the French found some respite in next year. The Duke of Marlborough had intended the 1705 campaign – an invasion of France through the Moselle valley – to complete the work of Blenheim and persuade King Louis XIV to make peace but the plan had been thwarted by friend and foe alike. The reluctance of his Dutch allies to see their frontiers denuded of troops for another gamble in Germany had denied Marlborough the initiative but of far greater importance was the Margrave of Baden's pronouncement that he could not join the Duke in strength for the coming offensive. This was in part due to the sudden switching of troops from the Rhine to reinforce Prince Eugene in Italy and part due to the deterioration of Baden's health brought on by the re-opening of a severe foot wound he had received at the storming of the Schellenberg the previous year. Marlborough had to cope with the death of Emperor Leopold I in May and the accession of Joseph I, which unavoidably complicated matters for the Grand Alliance.

The resilience of the French king and the efforts of his generals also added to Marlborough's problems. Marshal Villeroi, exerting considerable pressure on the Dutch commander, Count Overkirk, along the Meuse, took Huy on 10 June before pressing on towards Liège. With Marshal Villars sitting strong on the Moselle, the Allied commander – whose supplies had by now become very short – was forced to call off his campaign on 16 June. "What a disgrace for Marlborough," exulted Villeroi, "to have made false movements without any result!" With Marlborough's departure north, the French transferred troops from the Moselle valley to reinforce Villeroi in Flanders, while Villars marched off to the Rhine.

The Anglo-Dutch forces gained minor compensation for the failed Moselle campaign with the success at Elixheim and the crossing of the Lines of Brabant in the Spanish Netherlands (Huy was also retaken on 11 July) but a chance to bring the French to a decisive engagement eluded Marlborough. The year 1705 proved almost entirely barren for the Duke, whose military disappointments were only partly compensated by efforts on the diplomatic front where, at the courts of Düsseldorf, Frankfurt, Vienna, Berlin and Hanover, Marlborough sought to bolster support for the Grand Alliance and extract promises of prompt assistance for the following year's campaign.

== Prelude ==
On 11 January 1706 Marlborough finally reached London at the end of his diplomatic tour but he had already been planning his strategy for the coming season. The first option (although it is debatable to what extent the Duke was committed to such an enterprise) was a plan to transfer his forces from the Spanish Netherlands to northern Italy; once there, he intended linking up with Prince Eugene in order to defeat the French and safeguard Savoy from being overrun. Savoy would then serve as a gateway into France by way of the mountain passes or an invasion with naval support along the Mediterranean coast via Nice and Toulon, in connexion with redoubled Allied efforts in Spain.

However, the monarchs of Denmark, Prussia, and Hanover refused to allow their contingents in Anglo-Dutch pay to march to Italy. Although the Dutch did not oppose Marlborough’s plan in principle, they were unwilling to commit any of their own troops. As a result, Marlborough would have been able to take only his English forces and some 9,000 Hessians to Italy. It seems that the Duke's favoured scheme was to return to the Moselle valley (where Marshal Marsin had recently taken command of French forces) and once more attempt an advance into the heart of France. But these decisions soon became academic. Shortly after Marlborough landed in the Dutch Republic on 14 April, news arrived of big Allied setbacks in the wider war.

Determined to show the Grand Alliance that France was still resolute, Louis XIV prepared to launch a double surprise in Alsace and northern Italy. On the latter front Marshal Vendôme defeated the Imperial army at Calcinato on 19 April, pushing the Imperialists back in confusion (French forces were now in a position to prepare for the long-anticipated siege of Turin). In Alsace, Marshal Villars took Baden by surprise and captured Haguenau, driving him back across the Rhine in some disorder, thus creating a threat on Landau. With these reverses, the Dutch now also refused to contemplate Marlborough's ambitious march to Italy or any plan that denuded their borders of the Duke and their army. Marlborough was now again forced to prepare a campaign in the Low Countries.

=== On the move ===
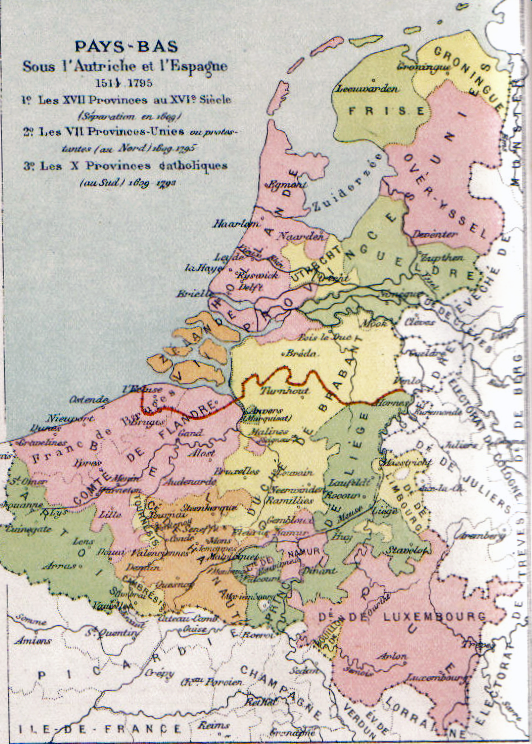
Map of the Low Countries during the War of the Spanish Succession. The village of Ramillies is in Brabant, near the tripoint between Brabant, Namur and Liège.

The Duke left The Hague on 9 May. "God knows I go with a heavy heart," he wrote six days later to his friend and political ally in England, Lord Godolphin, "for I have no hope of doing anything considerable, unless the French do what I am very confident they will not ..." – in other words, court battle. On 17 May the Duke concentrated his Dutch and English troops at Tongeren, near Maastricht. The Hanoverians, Hessians and Danes, despite earlier undertakings, found, or invented, pressing reasons for withholding their support. Marlborough wrote an appeal to the Duke of Württemberg, the commander of the Danish contingent: "I send you this express to request your Highness to bring forward by a double march your cavalry so as to join us at the earliest moment ..." Additionally, the King in Prussia, Frederick I, had kept his troops in quarters behind the Rhine while his personal disputes with Vienna and the States General at The Hague remained unresolved. Nevertheless, the Duke could think of no circumstances why the French would leave their strong positions and attack his army, even if Villeroi was first reinforced by substantial transfers from Marsin's command. But in this he had miscalculated. Although Louis XIV wanted peace he wanted it on reasonable terms; for that, he needed victory in the field and to convince the Allies that his resources were by no means exhausted.

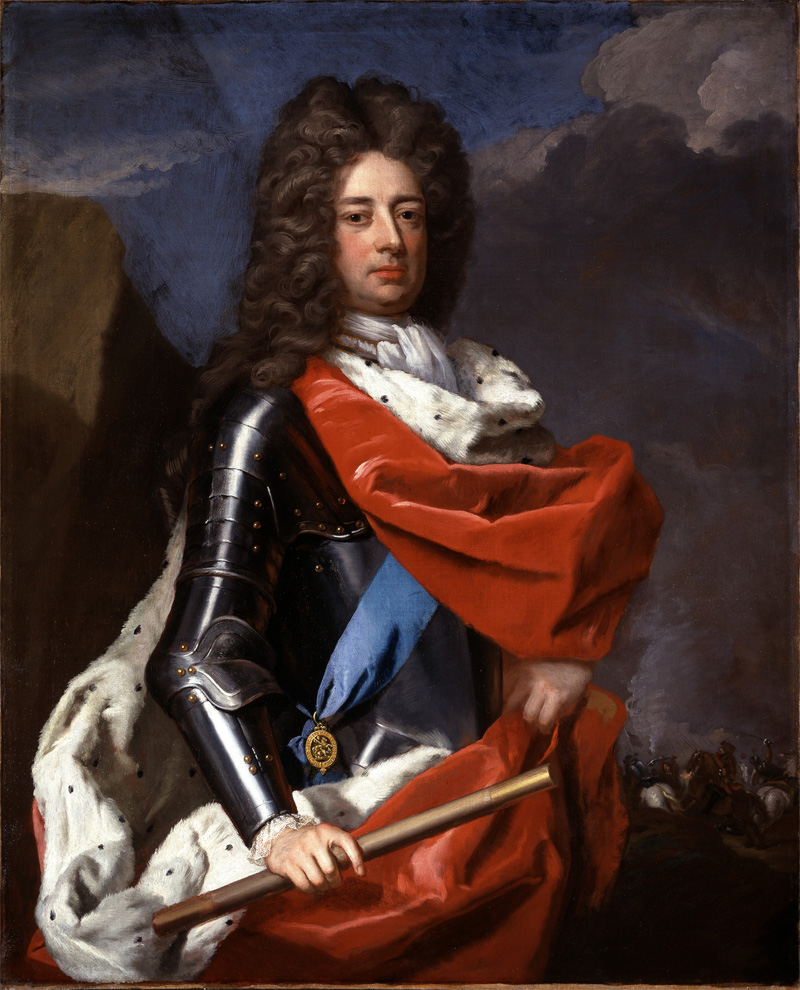
John Churchill, 1st Duke of Marlborough

Following the successes in Italy and along the Rhine, Louis XIV was now hopeful of similar results in Flanders. Far from standing on the defensive therefore – and unbeknown to Marlborough – Louis XIV was persistently goading his marshal into action. "[Villeroi] began to imagine," wrote St Simon, "that the King doubted his courage, and resolved to stake all at once in an effort to vindicate himself." Accordingly, on 18 May, Villeroi set off from Leuven at the head of 70 battalions, 132 squadrons and 62 cannon – comprising an overall force of some 60,000 troops – and crossed the river Dyle to seek battle with the enemy. Spurred on by his growing confidence in his ability to out-general his opponent, and by Versailles’ determination to avenge Blenheim, Villeroi and his generals anticipated success.

Neither opponent expected the clash at the exact moment or place where it occurred. The French moved first to Tienen, (as if to threaten Zoutleeuw, abandoned by the French in October 1705), before turning southwards, heading for Jodoigne – this line of march took Villeroi's army towards the narrow aperture of dry ground between the rivers Mehaigne and Petite Gette close to the small villages of Ramillies and Taviers; but neither commander quite appreciated how far his opponent had travelled. Villeroi still believed (on 22 May) the Allies were a full day's march away when in fact they had camped near Corswaren waiting for the Danish squadrons to catch up; for his part, Marlborough deemed Villeroi still at Jodoigne when in reality he was now approaching the plateau of Mont St. André with the intention of pitching camp near Ramillies (see map at right). However, the Prussian infantry was not there. Marlborough wrote to Lord Raby, the English resident at Berlin: "If it should please God to give us victory over the enemy, the Allies will be little obliged to the King [Frederick] for the success."

The following day, at 01:00, Marlborough dispatched Cadogan, his Quartermaster-General, with an advanced guard to reconnoitre the same dry ground that Villeroi's army was now heading toward, country that was well known to the Duke from previous campaigns. Two hours later the Duke followed with the main body: 74 battalions, 123 squadrons, 90 pieces of artillery and 20 mortars, totalling 62,000 troops. About 08:00, after Cadogan had just passed Merdorp, his force made brief contact with a party of French hussars gathering forage on the edge of the plateau of Jandrenouille. After a brief exchange of shots the French retired and Cadogan's dragoons pressed forward. With a short lift in the mist, Cadogan soon discovered the smartly ordered lines of Villeroi's advance guard some 6 kilometres (4 miles) off; a galloper hastened back to warn Marlborough. Two hours later the Duke, accompanied by the Dutch field commander Field Marshal Overkirk, Quartermaster-General Daniël van Dopff, and the Allied staff, rode up to Cadogan where on the horizon to the westward he could discern the massed ranks of the French army deploying for battle along the 6 km (4 mi) front. Marlborough later told Bishop Burnet: "The French army looked the best of any he had ever seen."

== Battle ==
=== Battlefield ===
The battlefield of Ramillies is very similar to that of Blenheim: here too there is an immense area of arable land unimpeded by woods or hedges. Villeroi's right rested on the villages of Franquenée and Taviers, with the river Mehaigne protecting his flank. A large open plain, about 2 km (1 mi) wide, lay between Taviers and Ramillies, but unlike Blenheim, there was no stream to hinder the cavalry. His centre was secured by Ramillies itself, lying on a slight eminence which gave distant views to the north and east. The French left flank was protected by broken country, and by a stream, the Petite Gheete, which runs deep between steep and slippery slopes. On the French side of the stream the ground rises to Offus, the village which, together with Autre-Eglise farther north, anchored Villeroi's left flank. To the west of the Petite Gheete rises the plateau of Mont St. André; a second plain, the plateau of Jandrenouille – upon which the Anglo-Dutch army amassed – rises to the east.

=== Initial dispositions ===
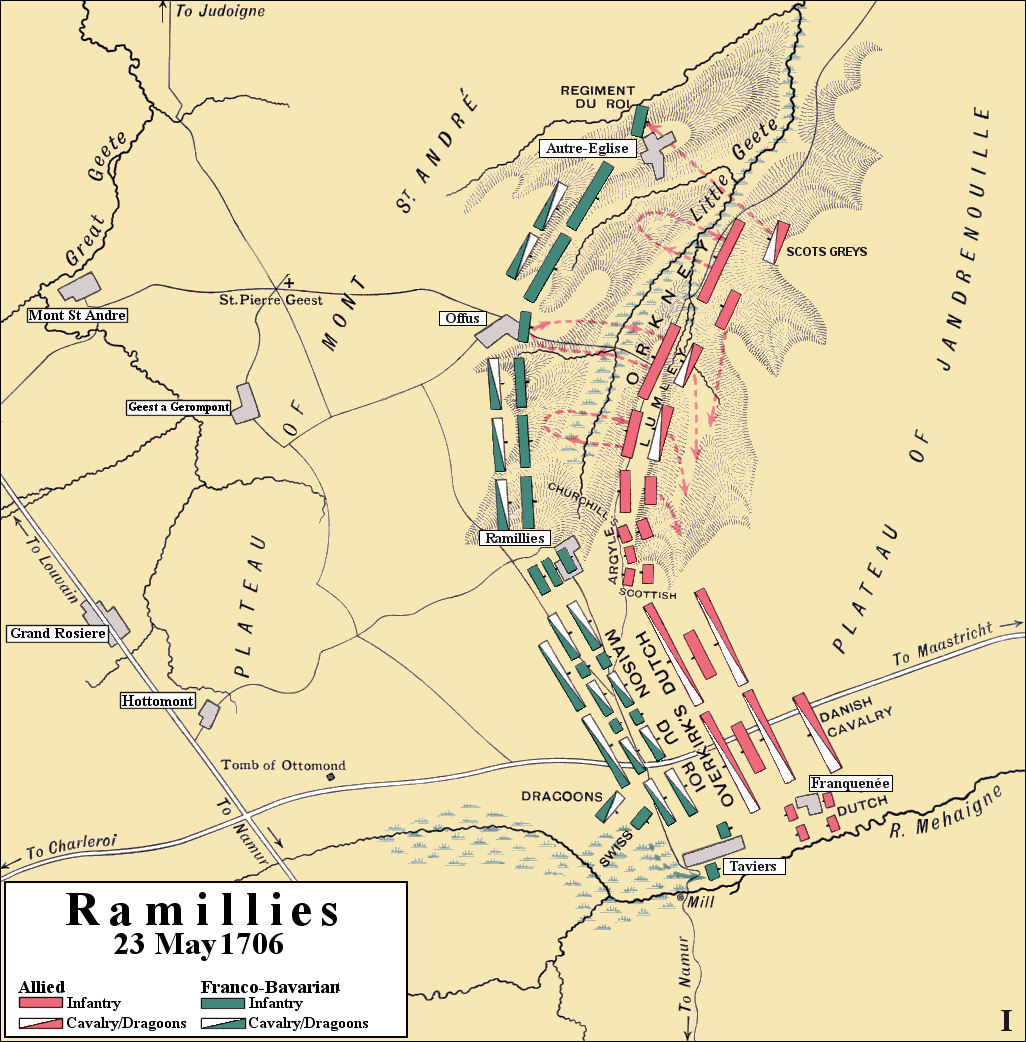
Initial attack at the Battle of Ramillies, 23 May 1706. To the south, between Taviers and Ramillies, both commanders positioned the bulk of their cavalry. It was here that Marlborough made his breakthrough.

At 11:00 the Duke ordered the army to take standard battle formation. On the far right, towards Foulz, the British battalions and squadrons took up their posts in a double line near the Jeuche stream. The centre was formed by the mass of Dutch, German, Protestant Swiss and Scottish infantry – perhaps 30,000 men – facing Offus and Ramillies. Also facing Ramillies Marlborough placed a powerful battery of thirty 24-pounders, dragged into position by a team of oxen; further batteries were positioned overlooking the Petite Gheete. On their left, on the broad plain between Taviers and Ramillies – and where Marlborough thought the decisive encounter must take place – Overkirk drew the 69 squadrons of the Dutch and Danish horse, supported by 19 battalions of Dutch infantry and two artillery pieces.

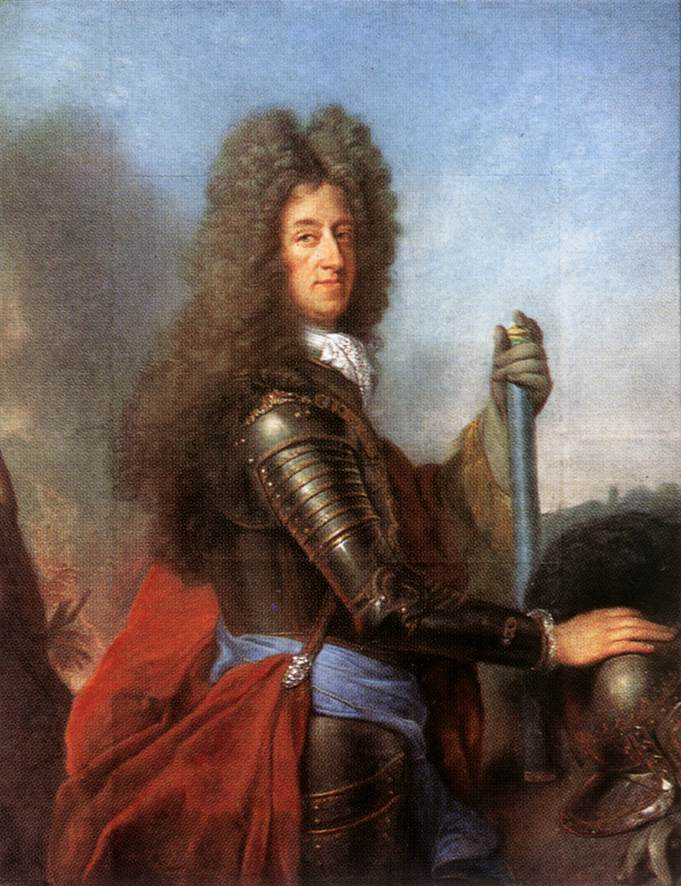
Portrait of Maximilian II Emanuel by Joseph Vivien

Meanwhile, Villeroi deployed his forces. In Taviers on his right, he placed two battalions of the Greder Suisse Régiment, with a smaller force forward in Franquenée; the whole position was protected by the boggy ground of the river Mehaigne, thus preventing an Allied flanking movement. In the open country between Taviers and Ramillies, he placed 82 squadrons under General de Guiscard supported by several interleaved brigades of French, Swiss and Bavarian infantry. Along the Ramillies–Offus–Autre Eglise ridge-line, Villeroi positioned Walloon and Bavarian infantry, supported by Maximilian II Emanuel's 50 squadrons of Bavarian and Wallonian cavalry placed behind on the plateau of Mont St. André. Ramillies, Offus and Autre-Eglise were all packed with troops and put in a state of defence, with alleys barricaded and walls loop-holed for muskets. Villeroi also positioned powerful batteries near Ramillies. These guns (some of which were of the three barrelled kind first seen at Elixheim the previous year) enjoyed good arcs of fire, able to fully cover the approaches of the plateau of Jandrenouille over which the Allied infantry would have to pass.

Marlborough, however, noticed several important weaknesses in the French dispositions. Tactically, it was imperative for Villeroi to occupy Taviers on his right and Autre-Eglise on his left, but by adopting this posture he had been forced to over-extend his forces. Moreover, this disposition – concave in relation to the Allied army – gave Marlborough the opportunity to form a more compact line, drawn up in a shorter front between the 'horns' of the French crescent; when the Allied blow came it would be more concentrated and carry more weight. Additionally, the Duke's disposition facilitated the transfer of troops across his front far more easily than his foe, a tactical advantage that would grow in importance as the events of the afternoon unfolded. Although Villeroi had the option of enveloping the flanks of the Allied army as they deployed on the plateau of Jandrenouille – threatening to encircle their army – the Duke correctly gauged that the characteristically cautious French commander was intent on a defensive battle along the ridge-line.

=== Taviers ===
At 13:00 the batteries went into action; a little later two Allied columns set out from the extremities of their line and attacked the flanks of the Franco-Bavarian army. To the south, 4 Dutch battalions, (Note: 2 battalions Frisian Guards and the battalions of Slangenburg and Salish) under the command of Colonel Wertmüller, came forward with their two field guns to seize the hamlet of Franquenée. The small Swiss garrison in the village, shaken by the sudden onslaught and unsupported by the battalions to their rear, were soon compelled back towards the village of Taviers. Taviers was of particular importance to the Franco-Bavarian position: it protected the otherwise unsupported flank of General de Guiscard's cavalry on the open plain, while at the same time, it allowed the French infantry to pose a threat to the flanks of the Dutch and Danish squadrons as they came forward into position. But hardly had the retreating Swiss rejoined their comrades in that village when the Dutch Guards renewed their attack. The fighting amongst the alleys and cottages soon deteriorated into a fierce bayonet and clubbing mêlée, but the superiority in Dutch firepower soon told. The accomplished French officer, Colonel de la Colonie, standing on the plain nearby remembered: "This village was the opening of the engagement, and the fighting there was almost as murderous as the rest of the battle put together." By about 15:00 the Swiss had been pushed out of the village into the marshes beyond.

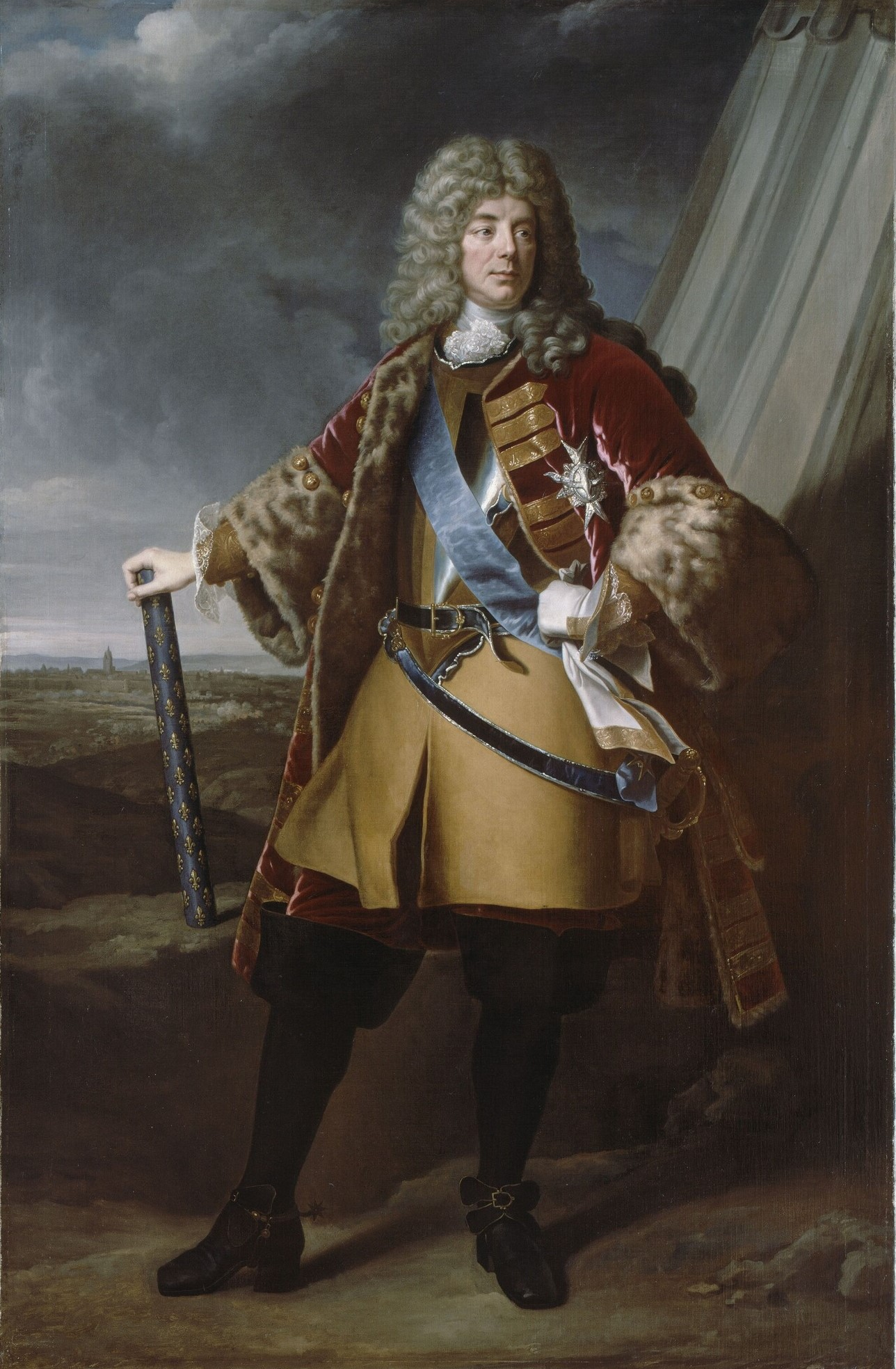
François de Neufville, Duke of Villeroi, Marshal of France. The Battle of Ramillies was Villeroi's last command.

Villeroi's right flank fell into chaos and was now open and vulnerable. Alerted to the situation de Guiscard ordered an immediate attack with 14 squadrons of French dragoons currently stationed in the rear. Two other battalions of the Greder Suisse Régiment were also sent, but the attack was poorly co-ordinated and consequently went in piecemeal. The Anglo-Dutch commanders now sent dismounted Dutch dragoons into Taviers, which, together with the Guards and their field guns, poured concentrated musketry- and canister-fire into the advancing French troops. Colonel d’Aubigni, leading his regiment, fell mortally wounded.

As the French ranks wavered, the leading squadrons of Württemberg's Danish horse – now unhampered by enemy fire from either village – were also sent into the attack and fell upon the exposed flank of the Franco-Swiss infantry and dragoons. De la Colonie, with his Grenadiers Rouge regiment, together with the Cologne Guards who were brigaded with them, was now ordered forward from his post south of Ramillies to support the faltering counter-attack on the village. But on his arrival, all was chaos: "Scarcely had my troops got over when the dragoons and Swiss who had preceded us, came tumbling down upon my battalions in full flight ... My own fellows turned about and fled along with them." De La Colonie managed to rally some of his grenadiers, together with the remnants of the French dragoons and Greder Suisse battalions, but it was an entirely peripheral operation, offering only fragile support for Villeroi's right flank.

=== Offus and Autre-Eglise ===
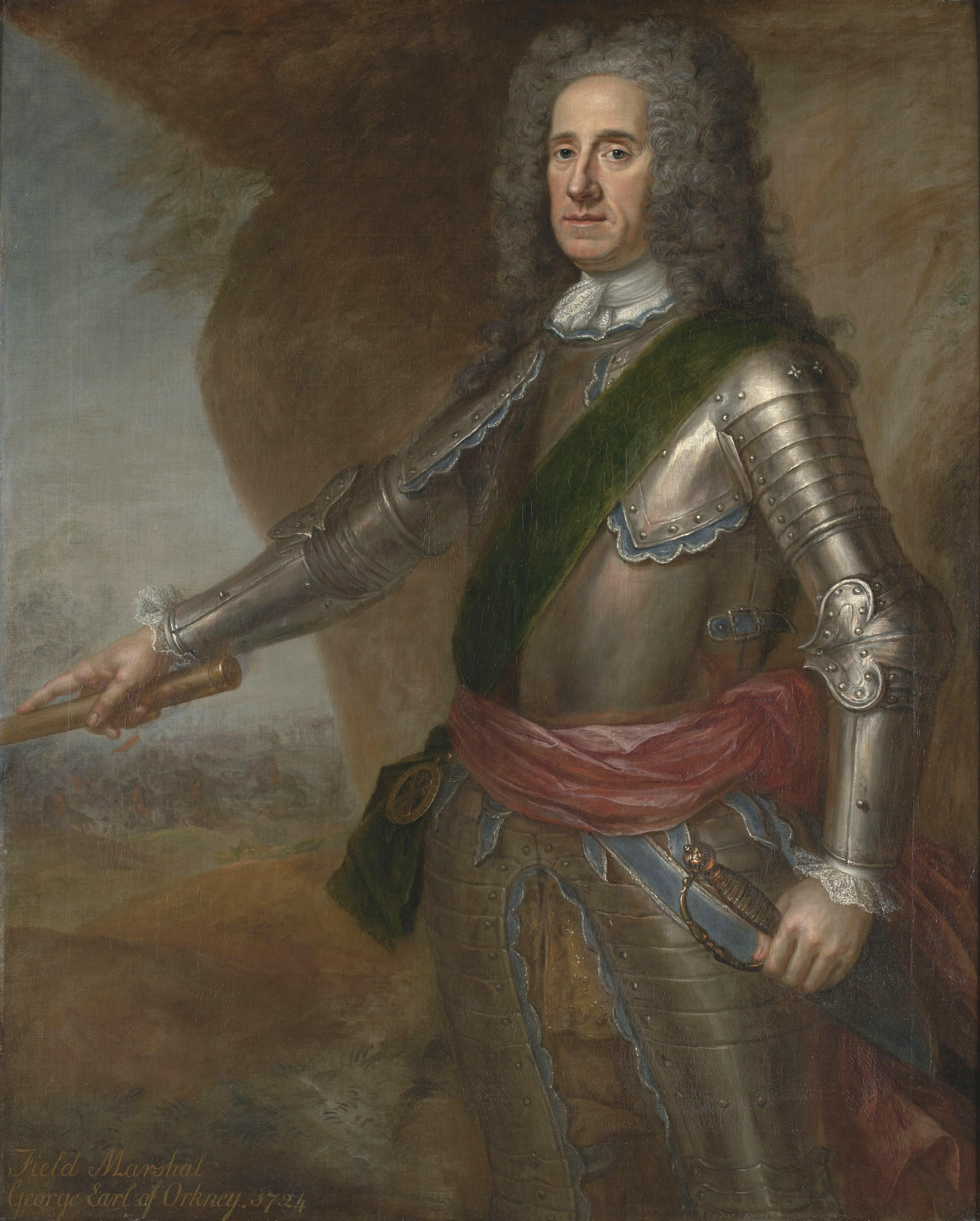
Field Marshal George Hamilton 1666–1737 Earl of Orkney, by Martin Maingaud

While the attack on Taviers went on the Earl of Orkney launched his first line of English across the Petite Gheete in a determined attack against the barricaded villages of Offus and Autre-Eglise on the Allied right. Villeroi, posting himself near Offus, watched anxiously the redcoats' advance, mindful of the counsel he had received on 6 May from Louis XIV: "Have particular care to that part of the line which will endure the first shock of the English troops." Heeding this advice the French commander began to transfer battalions from his centre to reinforce the left, drawing more foot from the already weakened right to replace them.

As the English battalions descended the gentle slope of the Petite Gheete valley, struggling through the boggy stream, they were met by Major General de la Guiche's disciplined Walloon infantry sent forward from around Offus. After concentrated volleys, exacting heavy casualties on the redcoats, the Walloons reformed back to the ridgeline in good order. The English took some time to reform their ranks on the dry ground beyond the stream and press on up the slope towards the cottages and barricades on the ridge. The vigour of the English assault, however, was such that they threatened to break through the line of the villages and out onto the open plateau of Mont St André beyond. This was potentially dangerous for the Allied infantry who would then be at the mercy of the Elector's Bavarian and Walloon squadrons patiently waiting on the plateau for the order to move.

Although Henry Lumley's English cavalry had managed to cross the marshy ground around the Petite Gheete, it was soon evident to Marlborough that sufficient cavalry support would not be practicable and that the battle could not be won on the Allied right. The Duke, therefore, called off the attack against Offus and Autre-Eglise. To make sure that Orkney obeyed his order to withdraw, Marlborough sent his Quartermaster-General in person with the command. Despite Orkney's protestations, Cadogan insisted on compliance and, reluctantly, Orkney gave the word for his troops to fall back to their original positions on the edge of the plateau of Jandrenouille. It is still not clear how far Orkney's advance was planned only as a feint; according to historian David Chandler it is probably more accurate to surmise that Marlborough launched Orkney in a serious probe with a view to sounding out the possibilities of the sector. Nevertheless, the attack had served its purpose. Villeroi had given his personal attention to that wing and strengthened it with large bodies of horse and foot that ought to have been taking part in the decisive struggle south of Ramillies.

=== Ramillies ===
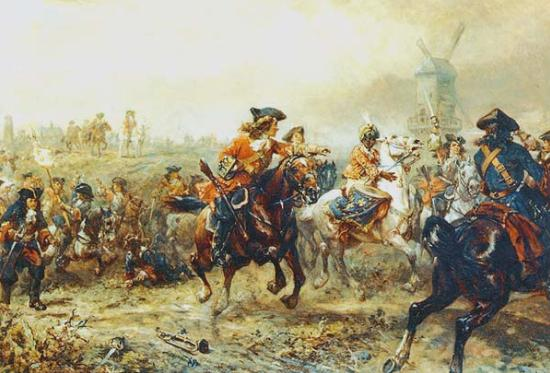
King's Horse at Ramillies, 1706

Meanwhile, the Dutch assault on Ramillies was gaining pace. Marlborough's younger brother, General of Infantry Charles Churchill, ordered four brigades of foot to attack the village. The assault consisted of 12 battalions of Dutch infantry commanded by Major Generals Scholten and Sparre; two brigades of Saxons under Count Schulenburg; a Scottish brigade in Dutch service led by the 2nd Duke of Argyle; and a small brigade of Protestant Swiss. The 20 French and Bavarian battalions in Ramillies, supported by the Irish who had left Ireland in the Flight of the Wild Geese to join Clare's Dragoons who fought as infantry and captured a colour from the British 3rd Regiment of Foot and a small brigade of Cologne and Bavarian Guards under the Marquis de Maffei, put up a determined defence, initially driving back the attackers with severe losses as commemorated in the song Clare's Dragoons.

Seeing that Scholten and Sparre were faltering, Marlborough now ordered Orkney's second-line British and Danish battalions (who had not been used in the assault on Offus and Autre-Eglise) to move south towards Ramillies. Shielded as they were from observation by a slight fold in the land, their commander, Brigadier-General Van Pallandt, ordered the regimental colours to be left in place on the edge of the plateau to convince their opponents they were still in their initial position. Therefore, unbeknown to the French who remained oblivious to the Allies' real strength and intentions on the opposite side of the Petite Gheete, Marlborough was throwing his full weight against Ramillies and the open plain to the south. Villeroi meanwhile, was still moving more reserves of infantry in the opposite direction towards his left flank; crucially, it would be some time before the French commander noticed the subtle change in emphasis of the Allied dispositions.

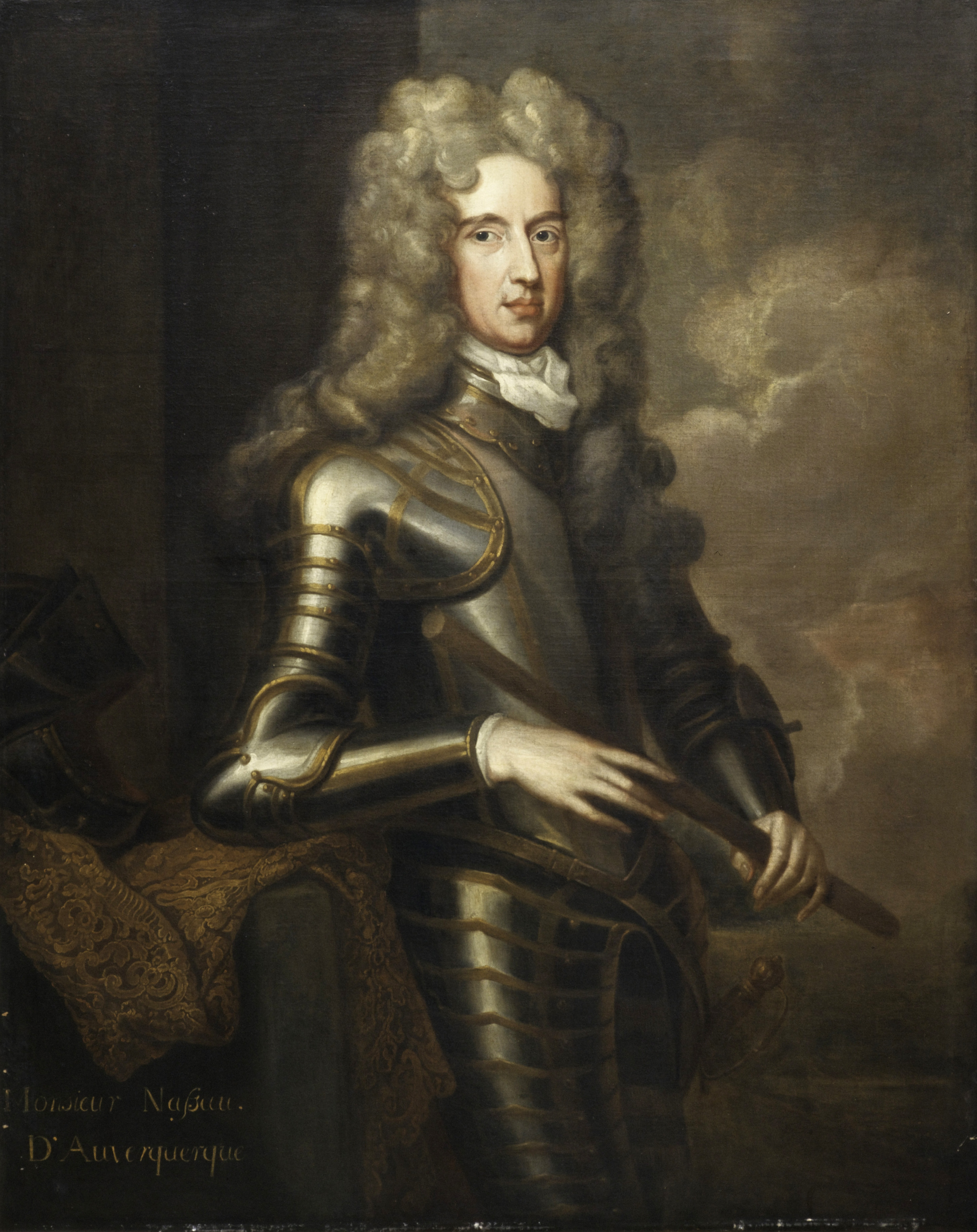
Henry of Nassau, Lord of Overkirk

Around 15:30 Overkirk advanced his massed squadrons on the open plain in support of the infantry attack on Ramillies. 48 Dutch squadrons, supported on their left by 21 Danish squadrons, led by Count Tilly and Lieutenants Generals Hompesch, d'Auvergne, Ostfriesland and Dopff – steadily advanced towards the enemy (taking care not to prematurely tire the horses), before breaking into a trot to gain the impetus for their charge. The Marquis de Feuquières writing after the battle described the scene: "They advanced in four lines ... As they approached they advanced their second and fourth lines into the intervals of their first and third lines; so that when they made their advance upon us, they formed only one front, without any intermediate spaces." This made it nearly impossible for the French cavalry to perform flanking manoeuvres.

The initial clash favoured the Dutch and Danish squadrons. The disparity of numbers – exacerbated by Villeroi stripping their ranks of infantry to reinforce his left flank – enabled Overkirk's cavalry to throw the first line of French horse back in some disorder towards their second-line squadrons. This line also came under severe pressure and, in turn, was forced back to their third-line of cavalry and the few battalions still remaining on the plain. But these French horsemen were amongst the best in Louis XIV's army – the Maison du Roi, supported by four elite squadrons of Bavarian Cuirassiers. Ably led by de Guiscard, the French cavalry rallied, thrusting back the Allied squadrons in successful local counterattacks. On Overkirk's right flank, close to Ramillies, ten of his squadrons suddenly broke ranks and were scattered, riding headlong to the rear to recover their order, leaving the left flank of the Allied assault on Ramillies dangerously exposed. Notwithstanding the lack of infantry support, de Guiscard threw his cavalry forward in an attempt to split the Allied army in two.

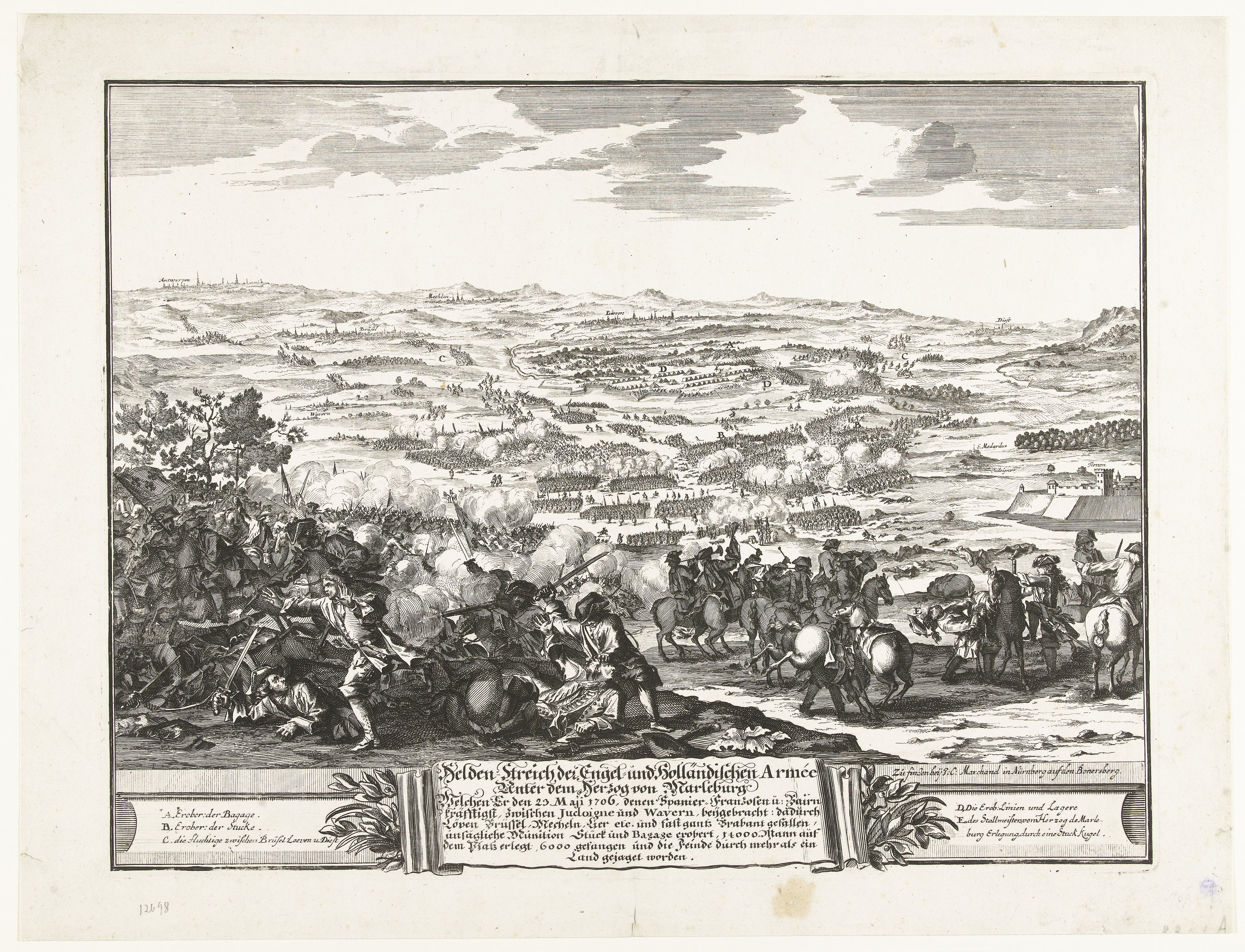
The Battle of Ramillies

A crisis threatened the centre, but from his vantage point Marlborough was at once aware of the situation. The Allied commander now summoned the cavalry on the right wing to reinforce his centre, leaving only the English squadrons in support of Orkney. Thanks to a combination of battle-smoke and favourable terrain, his redeployment went unnoticed by Villeroi who made no attempt to transfer any of his own 50 unused squadrons. While he waited for the fresh reinforcements to arrive, Marlborough flung himself into the mêlée, rallying some of the Dutch cavalry who were in confusion. But his personal involvement nearly led to his undoing. A number of French horsemen, recognising the Duke, came surging towards his party. Marlborough's horse tumbled and the Duke was thrown – "Milord Marlborough was rid over," wrote Orkney some time later. It was a critical moment of the battle. "Major-General Murray," recalled one eyewitness: "seeing him fall, marched up in all haste with two Swiss battalions to save him and stop the enemy who were hewing all down in their way." Samuel Constant de Rebecque helped Marlborough back on his feet, while Marlborough's newly appointed aide-de-camp, Richard Molesworth, galloped to the rescue, mounted the Duke on his horse and made good their escape, before Murray's disciplined ranks threw back the pursuing French troopers.

After a brief pause, Marlborough's equerry, Colonel Bringfield (or Bingfield), led up another of the Duke's spare horses; but while assisting him onto his mount, the unfortunate Bringfield was hit by an errant cannonball that sheared off his head. One account has it that the cannonball flew between the Captain-General's legs before hitting the unfortunate colonel, whose torso fell at Marlborough's feet – a moment subsequently depicted in a lurid set of contemporary playing cards. Nevertheless, the danger passed and Overkirk and Tilly restored order among the confused squadrons and ordered them to attack again, enabling the Duke to attend to the positioning of the cavalry reinforcements feeding down from his right flank – a change of which Villeroi remained blissfully unaware.

=== Breakthrough ===
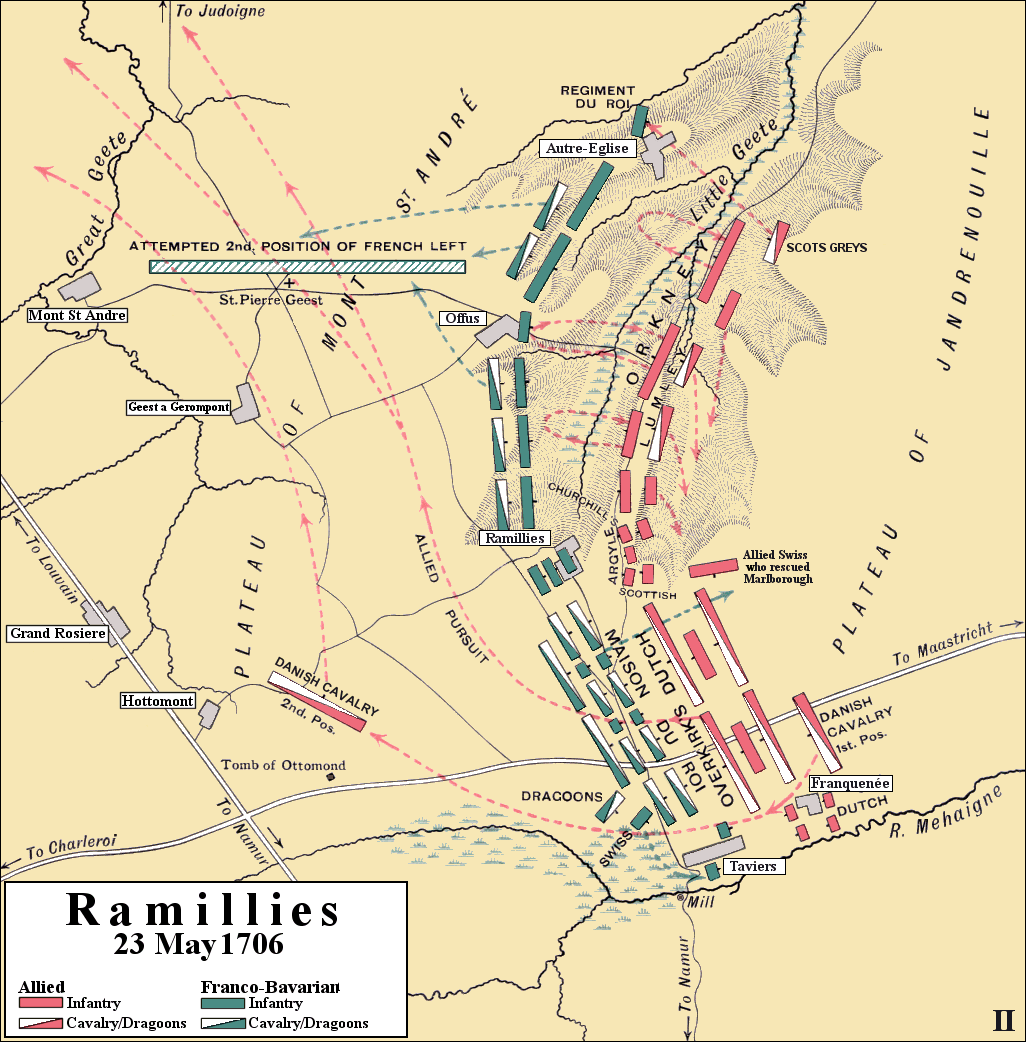
Allied squadrons transferred from north to south gave the Allies a 5–3 advantage on the plain where some 25,000 French and Allied cavalry were heavily engaged.

The time was about 16:30, and the two armies were in close contact across the whole 6 km (4 mi) front, from the skirmishing in the marshes in the south, through the vast cavalry battle on the open plain; to the fierce struggle for Ramillies at the centre, and to the north, where, around the cottages of Offus and Autre-Eglise, Orkney and de la Guiche faced each other across the Petite Gheete ready to renew hostilities.

The arrival of the transferring squadrons now began to tip the balance in favour of the Allies. Tired, and suffering a growing list of casualties, the numerical inferiority of Guiscard's squadrons battling on the plain at last began to tell. After earlier failing to hold or retake Franquenée and Taviers, Guiscard's right flank had become dangerously exposed and a fatal gap had opened on the right of their line. Taking advantage of this breach, Württemberg's Danish cavalry now swept forward, wheeling to penetrate the flank of the Maison du Roi whose attention was almost entirely fixed on holding back the Dutch. Sweeping forwards, virtually without resistance, the 21 Danish squadrons reformed behind the French around the area of the Tomb of Ottomond, facing north across the plateau of Mont St André towards the exposed flank of Villeroi's army.

The final Allied reinforcements for the cavalry contest to the south were at last in position; Marlborough's superiority on the left could no longer be denied, and his fast-moving plan took hold of the battlefield. Now, far too late, Villeroi tried to redeploy his 50 unused squadrons, but a desperate attempt to form line facing south, stretching from Offus to Mont St André, floundered amongst the baggage and tents of the French camp carelessly left there after the initial deployment. The Allied commander ordered his cavalry forward against the now heavily outnumbered French and Bavarian horsemen. De Guiscard's right flank, without proper infantry support, could no longer resist the onslaught and, turning their horses northwards, they broke and fled in complete disorder. Even the squadrons currently being scrambled together by Villeroi behind Ramillies could not withstand the onslaught. "We had not got forty yards on our retreat," remembered Captain Peter Drake, an Irishman serving with the French – "when the words sauve qui peut went through the great part, if not the whole army, and put all to confusion"

In Ramillies the Allied infantry, now reinforced by the English troops brought down from the north, at last broke through. The Régiment de Picardie stood their ground but were caught between Colonel Borthwick's Scots-Dutch regiment and the English reinforcements. Borthwick was killed, as was Charles O’Brien, the Irish Viscount Clare in French service, fighting at the head of his regiment. The Marquis de Maffei attempted one last stand with his Bavarian and Cologne Guards, but it proved in vain. Noticing a rush of horsemen fast approaching from the south, he later recalled: "... I went towards the nearest of these squadrons to instruct their officer, but instead of being listened to [I] was immediately surrounded and called upon to ask for quarter."

=== Pursuit ===
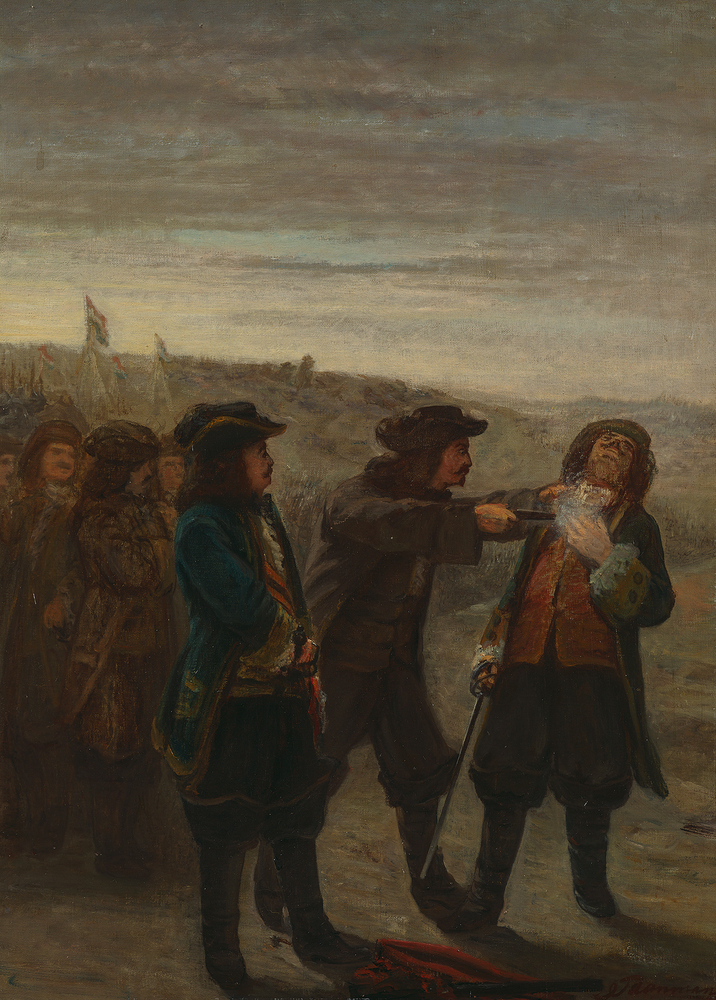
The murder attempt by a Bavarian cavalrymen on Overkirk. 19th-century Illustration by Jacob Taanman.

The roads leading north and west were choked with fugitives. Orkney now sent his English troops back across the Petite Gheete stream to once again storm Offus where de la Guiche's infantry had begun to drift away in the confusion. To the right of the infantry Lord John Hay's 'Scots Greys' also picked their way across the stream and charged the Régiment du Roi within Autre-Eglise. "Our dragoons," wrote John Deane, "pushing into the village ... made terrible slaughter of the enemy." The Bavarian Horse Grenadiers and the Electoral Guards withdrew and formed a shield about Villeroi and the Elector but were scattered by Lumley's cavalry. Stuck in the mass of fugitives fleeing the battlefield, the French and Bavarian commanders narrowly escaped capture by General Cornelius Wood who, unaware of their identity, had to content himself with the seizure of two Bavarian Lieutenant-Generals. Far to the south, the remnants of de la Colonie's brigade headed in the opposite direction towards the French held fortress of Namur.

The retreat became a rout. Individual Allied commanders drove their troops forward in pursuit, allowing their beaten enemy no chance to recover. Among them Overkirk, who pressed the chase so far into the night that he found himself very far from the battlefield. There, after returning a captured Bavarian officer's sword, he narrowly escaped an assassination attempt when the prisoner turned the weapon on him, only to be shot by a valet in time. Soon the Allied infantry could no longer keep up, but their cavalry were off the leash, heading through the gathering night for the crossings on the river Dyle. At last, however, Marlborough called a halt to the pursuit shortly after midnight near Meldert, 19 km (12 mi) from the field. "It was indeed a truly shocking sight to see the miserable remains of this mighty army," wrote Captain Drake, "... reduced to a handful."

== Aftermath ==
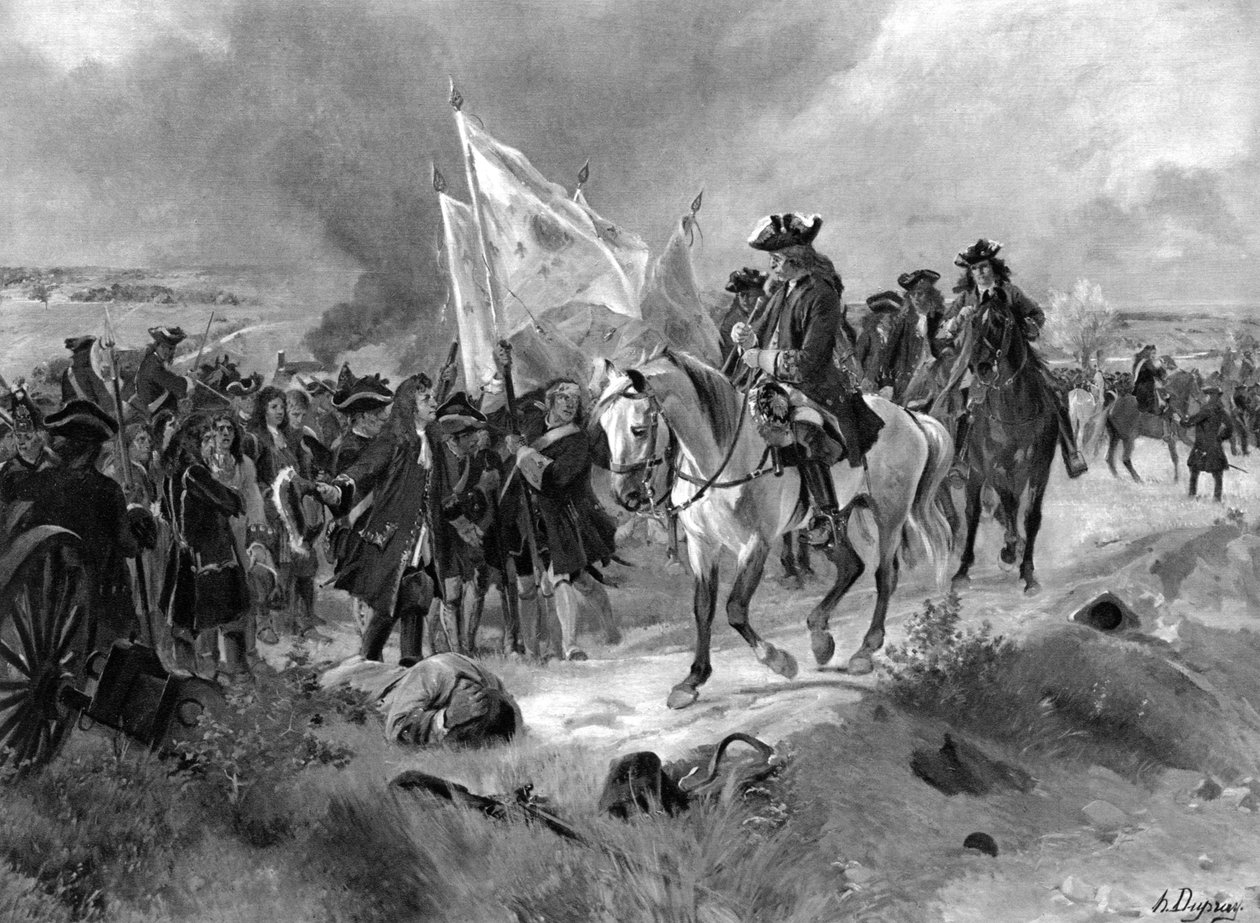
Marlborough receiving captured French standards at Ramillies

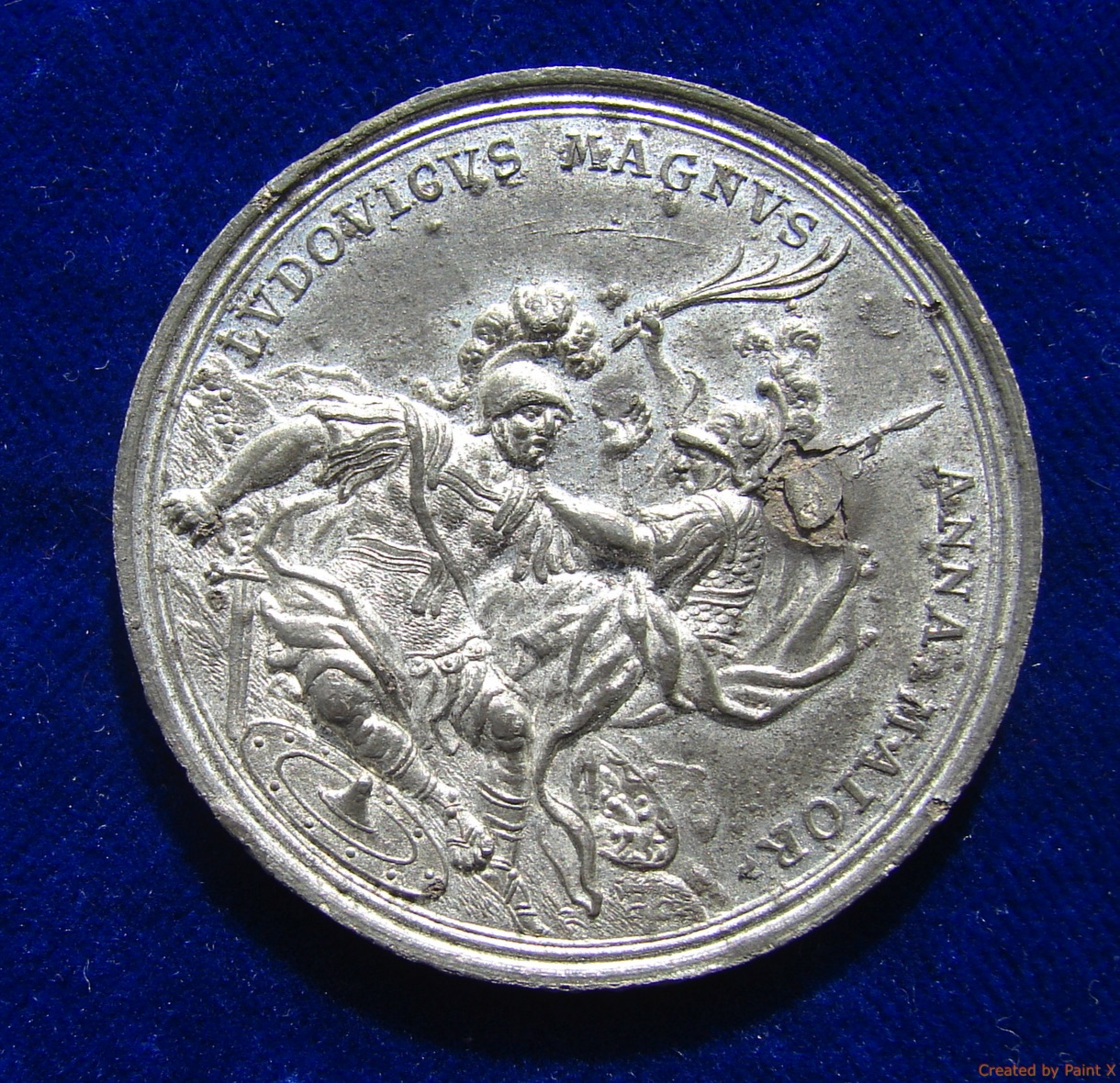
German war propaganda medal 1706. The obverse shows Louis XIV as a Roman warrior being subdued by Queen Anne as Minerva.

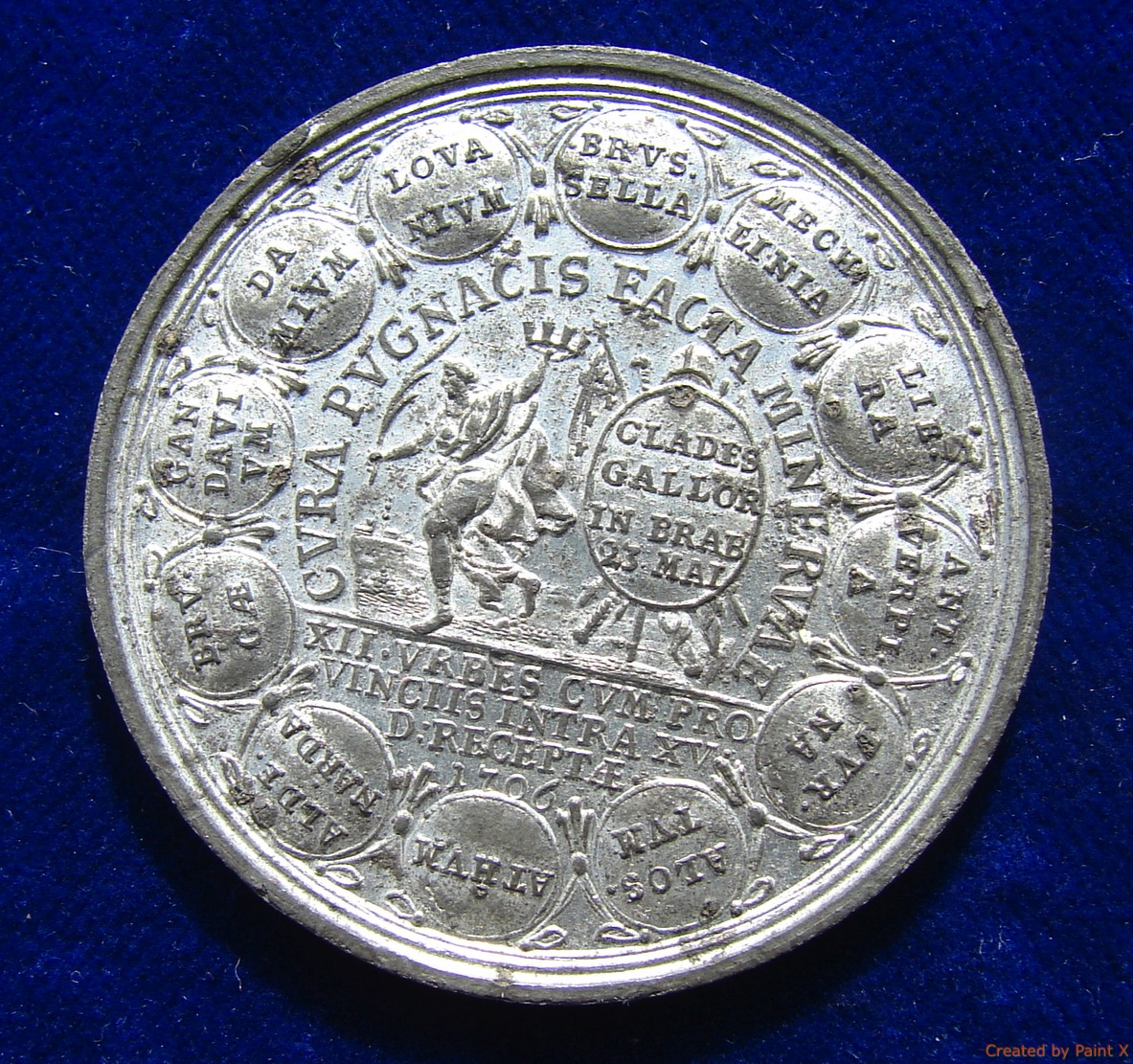
The reverse shows the seizure by the Allies of twelve Flanders towns: Brussels, Mechelen, Lier, Antwerp, Furnes (Veurne), Aalst, Ath, Oudenarde (Oudenaarde), Bruges (Brugge), Ghent (Gent), Damme, Leuven (Louvain).

What was left of Villeroi's army was now broken in spirit; the imbalance of the casualty figures amply demonstrates the extent of the disaster for Louis XIV's army: (see below). In addition, hundreds of French soldiers were fugitives, many of whom would never remuster to the colours. Villeroi also lost 52 artillery pieces and his entire engineer pontoon train. In the words of Marshal Villars, the French defeat at Ramillies was "the most shameful, humiliating and disastrous of routs".

Town after town now succumbed to the Allies. Leuven fell on 25 May 1706; three days later, the Allies entered Brussels, the capital of the Spanish Netherlands. Marlborough realised the great opportunity created by the early victory of Ramillies: "We now have the whole summer before us," wrote the Duke from Brussels to Robert Harley: "... and with the blessing of God I shall make the best use of it." Malines, Lierre, Ghent, Alost, Damme, Oudenaarde, Bruges, and on 6 June Antwerp, all subsequently fell to Marlborough's victorious army and, like Brussels, proclaimed the Austrian candidate for the Spanish throne, the Archduke Charles, as their sovereign. Villeroi was helpless to arrest the process of collapse. When Louis XIV learnt of the disaster he recalled Marshal Vendôme from northern Italy to take command in Flanders; but it would be weeks before the command changed hands.

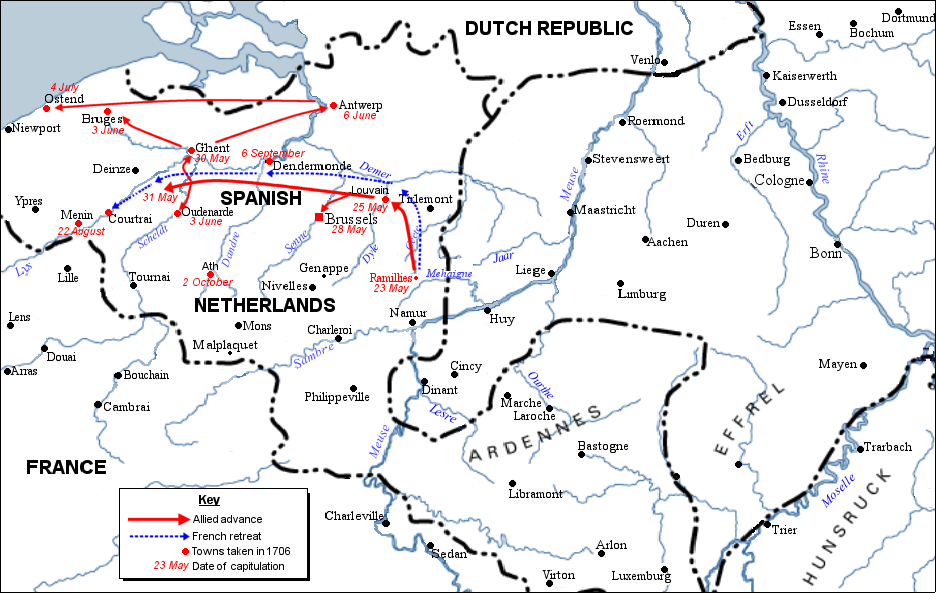
Allied gains of the Ramillies campaign 1706. (Note: Dates of capitulation differ slightly depending on source).

As news spread of the Allies' triumph, the Prussians, Hessians and Hanoverian contingents, long delayed by their respective rulers, eagerly joined the pursuit of the broken French and Bavarian forces. "This," wrote Marlborough wearily, "I take to be owing to our late success." Meanwhile, Overkirk took the port of Ostend on 4 July thus opening a direct route to the English Channel for communication and supply, but the Allies were making scant progress against Dendermonde whose governor, the Marquis de Valée, was stubbornly resisting. Only later when Cadogan and Churchill went to take charge did the town's defences begin to fail.

Vendôme formally took over command in Flanders on 4 August; Villeroi would never again receive a major command: "I cannot foresee a happy day in my life save only that of my death." Louis XIV was more forgiving to his old friend: "At our age, Marshal, we must no longer expect good fortune." In the meantime, Marlborough invested the elaborate fortress of Menin which, after a costly siege, capitulated on 22 August. Dendermonde finally succumbed on 6 September followed by Ath – the last conquest of 1706 – on 2 October. By the time Marlborough had closed down the Ramillies campaign he had denied the French most of the Spanish Netherlands west of the Meuse and north of the Sambre – it was an unsurpassed operational triumph for the English Duke but once again it was not decisive as these gains did not defeat France.

The immediate question for the Allies was how to deal with the Spanish Netherlands, a subject on which the Austrians and the Dutch were diametrically opposed. Emperor Joseph I, acting on behalf of his younger brother King Charles III, absent in Spain, claimed that reconquered Brabant and Flanders should be put under immediate possession of a governor named by himself. The Dutch, however, who had supplied the major share of the troops and money to secure the victory (the Austrians had produced nothing of either) claimed the government of the region till the war was over, and that after the peace they should continue to garrison Barrier Fortresses stronger than those which had fallen so easily to Louis XIV's forces in 1701. Marlborough mediated between the two parties but favoured the Dutch position. To sway the Duke's opinion, the Emperor offered Marlborough the governorship of the Spanish Netherlands. It was a tempting offer, but in the name of Allied unity, it was one he refused. In the end England and the Dutch Republic took control of the newly won territory for the duration of the war; after which it was to be handed over to the direct rule of Charles III, subject to the reservation of a Dutch Barrier, the extent and nature of which had yet to be settled.

Meanwhile, on the Upper Rhine, Villars had been forced onto the defensive as battalion after battalion had been sent north to bolster collapsing French forces in Flanders; there was now no possibility of his undertaking the re-capture of Landau. Further good news for the Allies arrived from northern Italy where, on 7 September, Prince Eugene had routed a French army before the Piedmontese capital, Turin, driving the Franco-Spanish forces from northern Italy. Only from Spain did Louis XIV receive any good news where Das Minas and Galway had been forced to retreat from Madrid towards Valencia, allowing Philip V to re-enter his capital on 4 October. All in all though, the situation had changed considerably and Louis XIV began to look for ways to end what was fast becoming a ruinous war for France. For Queen Anne also, the Ramillies campaign had one overriding significance: "Now we have God be thanked so hopeful a prospect of peace." Instead of continuing the momentum of victory, however, cracks in Allied unity would enable Louis XIV to reverse some of the major setbacks suffered at Turin and Ramillies.

== Casualties ==
The total number of French casualties cannot be calculated precisely, so complete was the collapse of the Franco-Bavarian army that day. David G. Chandler's Marlborough as Military Commander and A Guide to the Battlefields of Europe are consistent with regards to French casualty figures, i.e. 12,000 dead and wounded plus some 7,000 taken prisoner. James Falkner, in Ramillies 1706: Year of Miracles, also notes 12,000 dead and wounded and "up to 10,000" taken prisoner. In Notes on the history of military medicine, Garrison puts French casualties at 13,000, including 2,000 killed, 3,000 wounded and 6,000 missing. In The Collins Encyclopaedia of Military History, Dupuy puts Villeroi's dead and wounded at 8,000, with a further 7,000 captured. Neil Litten, using French archives, suggests 7,000 killed and wounded and 6,000 captured, with a further 2,000 choosing to desert. John Millner's memoirs – Compendious Journal (1733) – is more specific, recording 12,087 of Villeroi's army were killed or wounded, with another 9,729 taken prisoner. In Marlborough, however, Correlli Barnett puts the total casualty figure as high as 15,000–30,000 dead and wounded with an additional 15,000 taken captive. Trevelyan estimates Villeroi's casualties at 13,000 but adds "his losses by desertion may have doubled that number". La Colonie omits a casualty figure in his Chronicles of an old Campaigner but Saint-Simon in his Memoirs states 4,000 killed adding "many others were wounded and many important persons were taken prisoner". Voltaire, however, in The Age of Louis XIV records "the French lost there twenty thousand men". Gaston Bodart states 2,000 killed or wounded, 6,000 captured and 7,000 scattered for a total of 13,000 casualties. Périni writes that both sides lost 2 to 3,000 killed or wounded (the Dutch losing precisely 716 killed and 1,712 wounded), and that 5,600 French were captured.

== See also ==
- The battle was used as the name of several Royal Navy ships, HMS Ramillies.
