= Ramillies, Belgium =

Municipality in Walloon Brabant province, Wallonia, Belgium

Ramillies
- Municipality
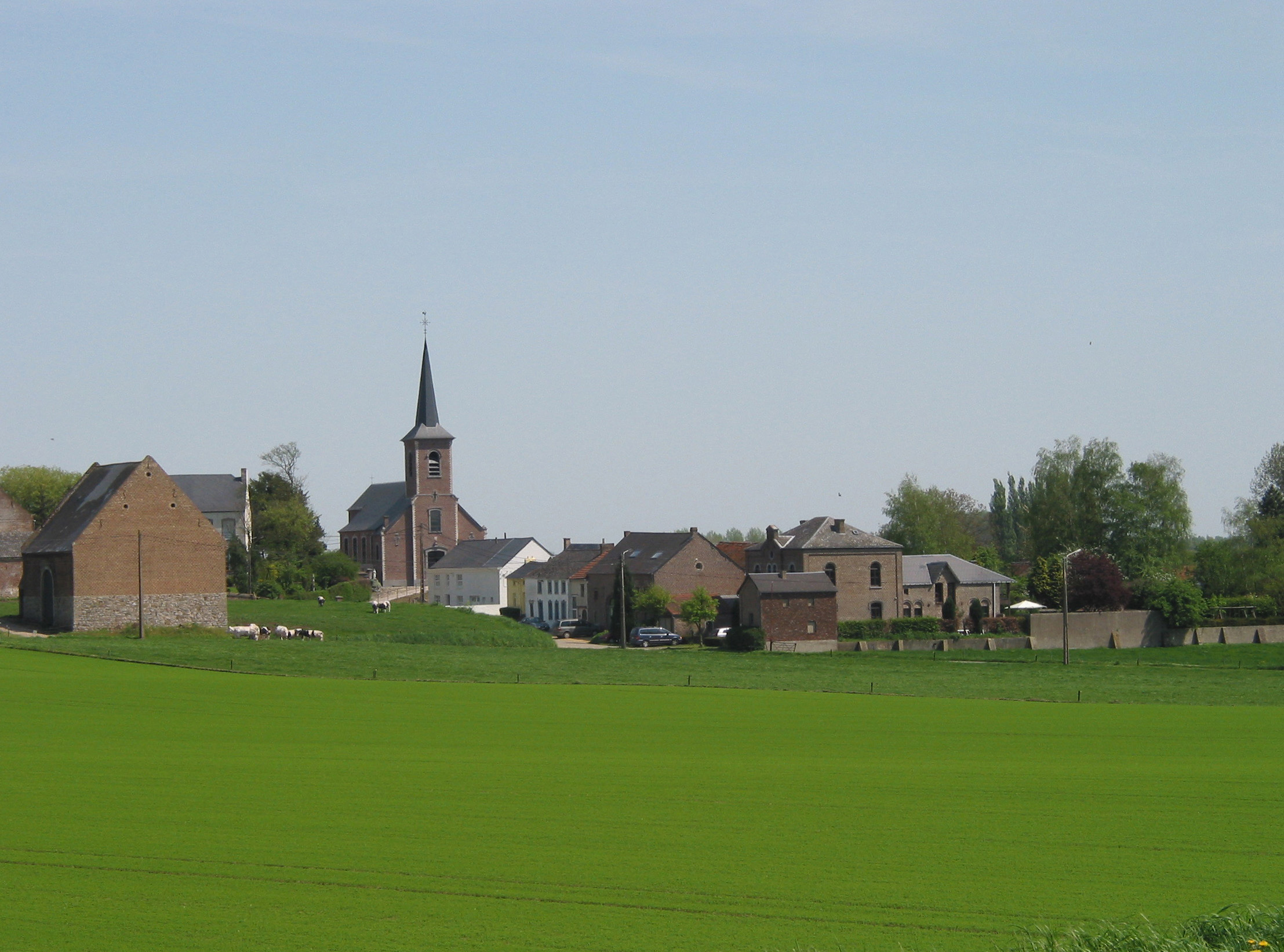
- Petit-Rosière

- Flag Coat of arms

- The municipality of Ramillies in Walloon Brabant
- Interactive map of Ramillies
- Location in Belgium
- Coordinates: 50°38′12″N 04°54′53″E
- Country: Belgium
- Community: French Community
- Region: Wallonia
- Province: Walloon Brabant
- Arrondissement: Nivelles

Government
  - Mayor: Jean-Jacques Mathy (REM)
  - Governing party: REM - Ecolo

Area
  - Total: 49.08 km^{2} (18.95 sq mi)

Population (2018-01-01)
  - Total: 6,394
  - Density: 130.3/km^{2} (337.4/sq mi)
- Postal codes: 1367
- NIS code: 25122
- Area codes: 081
- Website: www.ramillies.be

Ramillies (French pronunciation: [ʁamili]; Walloon: Ramiêye) is a municipality of Wallonia located in the Belgian province of Walloon Brabant. On 1 January 2012, Ramillies had a total population of 6,211. The total area is 48.68 km^{2} which gives a population density of 128 inhabitants per km^{2}.

The municipality consists of the following districts: Autre-Église, Bomal, Geest-Gérompont-Petit-Rosière, Grand-Rosière-Hottomont, Huppaye, Mont-Saint-André, and Ramillies-Offus.

The former Roman road from Bavay to Cologne passes through Ramillies. Just to the north of the road, also within the municipality, the Hottomont tumulus is one of the most significant tumuli in Belgium.

== See also ==
- Battle of Ramillies
