= Henry de Nassau, Lord Overkirk =

Dutch States Army officer

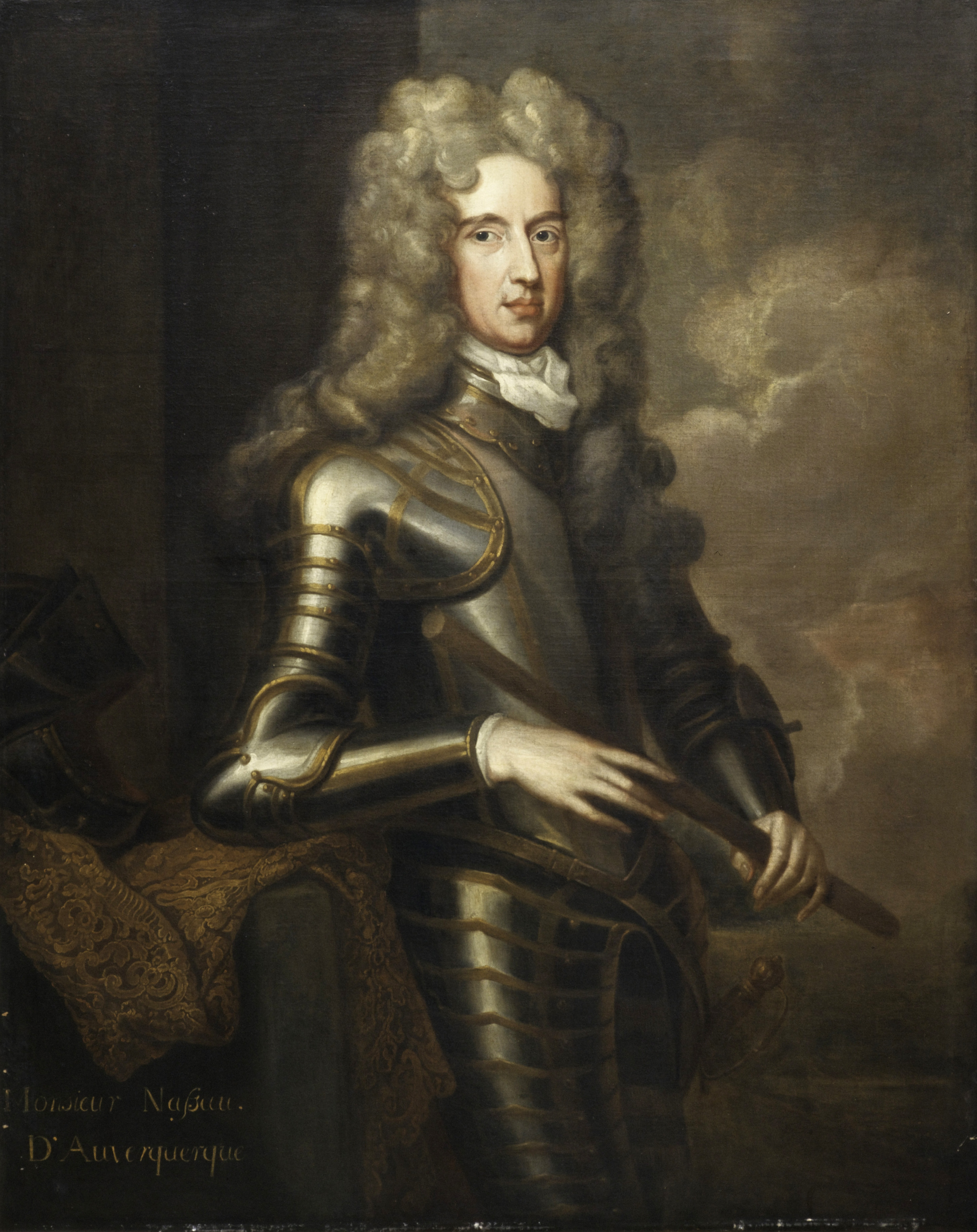
- Portrait by Sir Godfrey Kneller
- Native name: Hendrik
- Born: 1640; The Hague, The Netherlands
- Died: 18 October 1708 (aged 67–68) Roeselare, Flanders
- Buried: Ouderkerk aan den IJssel, South Holland
- Allegiance: Dutch Republic
- Service years: 1674–1708
- Conflicts: Franco-Dutch War; Battle of Seneffe; Battle of Saint-Denis; Nine Years' War; 1688 invasion of England; Battle of the Boyne; Battle of Aughrim; Battle of Leuze; Battle of Steenkerque; Battle of Landen; Siege of Namur; War of the Spanish Succession; Passage of the Lines of Brabant; Battle of Ramillies; Siege of Ostend; Siege of Ath; Battle of Oudenaarde; Siege of Lille
- Spouse: Frances Sommelsdijck (m. 1667)
- Children: Henry, Willem, 3 other sons and 3 daughters

Henry de Nassau, Lord Overkirk (Dutch: Hendrik van Nassau-Ouwerkerk) (c. 1640 – 18 October 1708) was a Dutch States Army officer who was a second cousin of William III of England. He would come to play a prominent role in wars against the Kingdom of France, and led the Dutch army during the battles of Ramillies and Oudenarde. While Lord of Ouwerkerk and Woudenberg in the Netherlands, the English called him "Lord Overkirk" or "Count Overkirk".

== Life ==
Born in The Hague to Louis of Nassau-Beverweerd (illegitimate son of Maurice of Nassau, Prince of Orange) and his wife Isabella van Hoorn, Ouwerkerk was baptised there on 16 December 1640. Granted the title Count of Nassau (graaf van Nassau) by the Emperor Leopold I in 1679, he joined William III's invasion of England in 1688, and was appointed the king's Master of the Horse the following year. He resided in London, notably at Overkirk House, which later became part of 10 Downing Street.

Ouwerkerk died on 18 October 1708 at Roeselare in modern-day Belgium and is buried the Nassau-LaLecq Crypt at Ouderkerk aan den IJssel, Netherlands. His widow continued to live at Overkirk House until her own death in 1720.

== Franco-Dutch War and Nine Years' War ==
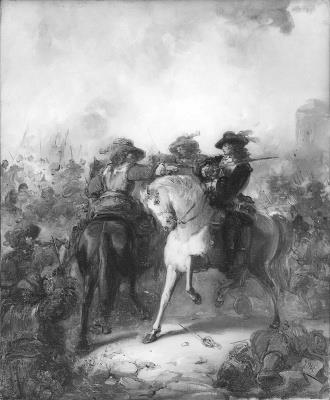
Ouwerkerk saves William III of Orange during the Battle of Saint-Denis

Already in his youth, Ouwerkerk entered military service. He first took part in the Franco-Dutch War and was wounded in the Battle of Seneffe. Some time later, he saved William III's life in the Battle of Saint-Denis. Prince William, who himself was fighting in the thick of the action, was so close to the enemy that the knight d'Esclainvilliers was already putting a gun to his chest when Ouwerkerk shot the Frenchman out of his saddle. This act was gratefully acknowledged by the States-General, with the gift of an honour guard, magnificent pistols and golden ornaments. William immediately made him a captain, and since then he accompanied William on most of his campaigns.

In 1688, at the start of the Nine Years' War, he accompanied William III during his invasion of England. He later took part in the Williamite War in Ireland, fighting at the Battle of the Boyne. After the battle, his force of 1,000 horsemen was the first to enter Dublin. Back on the continent, he drove off the French cavalry at the Battle of Leuze. In 1692, he fought the French again at the Battle of Steenkerque. The following year, Ouwerkerk gained great fame as colonel of the Dutch Horse Guards at the Battle of Landen. When the French broke through the entrenchments and their cavalry poured into the open plain behind them, English and Dutch horsemen mounted a desperate rearguard action to buy time for the rest of the army to retreat. Ouwerkerk's guards overran two French squadrons, pushed through a third, and captured several standards and prisoners. In doing so, he played a key role in saving much of the Allied army.

During the 1695 campaign, he commanded the cavalry in the army of Prince de Vaudemont, which covered the Allied forces besieging Namur. He was promoted to major-general on 16 March 1696, and to full general in 1697. After naturalising him as an English citizen, William III also appointed him Chief Marshal.

== War of the Spanish Succession ==
In 1702, he served under the joint command of Marlborough and the Earl of Athlone. During the Siege of Venlo, a dispute arose with General Obdam. Ouwerkerk had been appointed General of the Cavalry in 1701, while Obdam received the same rank in 1702. As a result, Obdam sought to alternate command with Ouwerkerk, but Ouwerkerk insisted on retaining sole authority. A temporary compromise was reached by assigning Obdam to lead the cavalry at Venlo, while Ouwerkerk commanded the cavalry with the field army.

In February 1703 Athlone died which created another complex dilemma for the Dutch regenten, as both Obdam and Ouwerkerk were eligible to succeed Athlone. Both men had long and distinguished military careers behind them and belonged to the most prestigious families in the country. Like all officers of the time, they were highly sensitive about matters of promotion and seniority. It was therefore decided to postpone the appointment to Field Marshal. Since two armies were needed, they could be assigned separate commands to avoid serving under each other. Obdam led the Siege of Bonn under Marlborough, while Ouwerkerk took command of the army that covered the siege near Maastricht.

=== Action at Tongeren and Maastricht ===
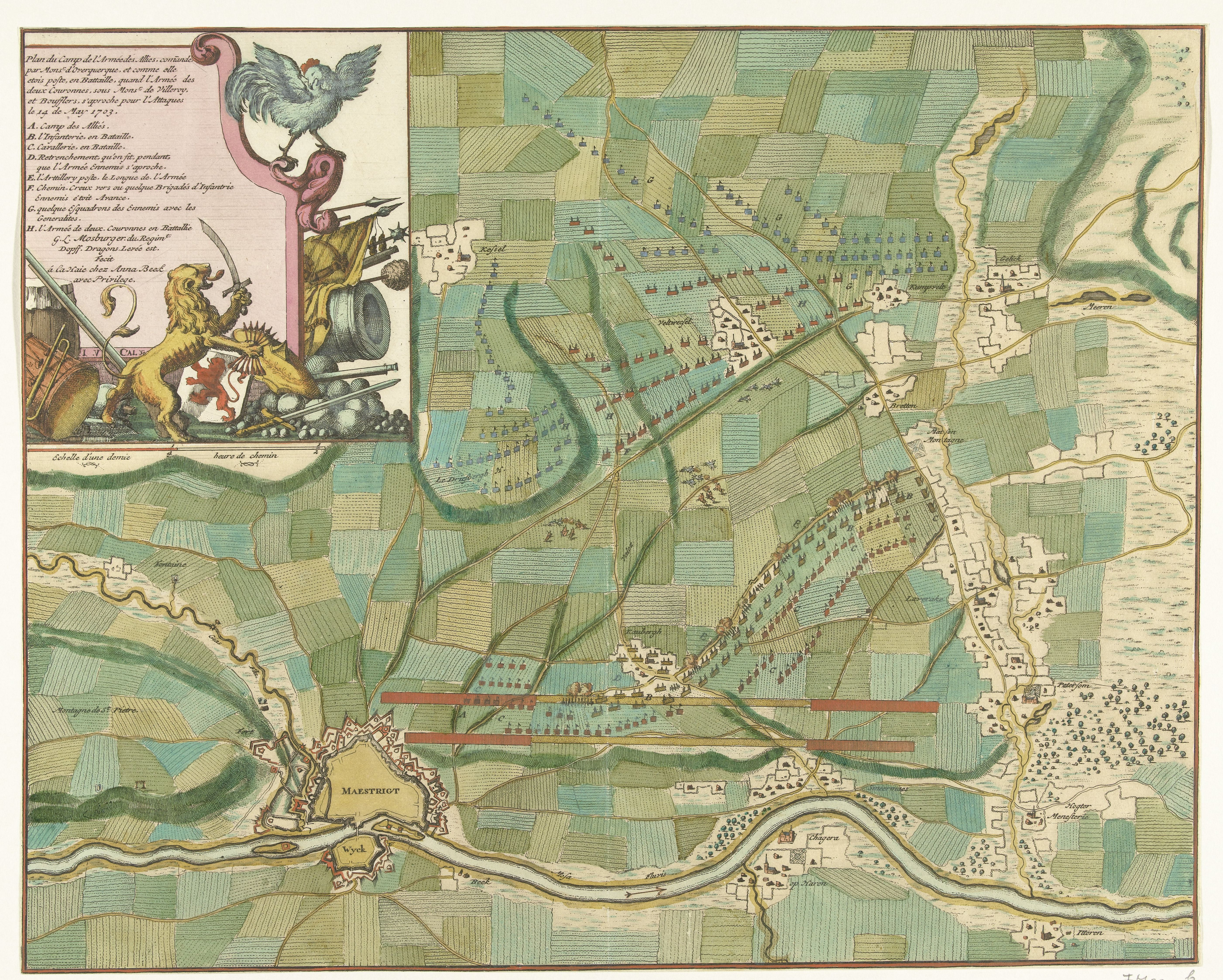
Map depicting the plan of the Allied army camp under the Count of Ouwerkerk before Maastricht, 14 May 1703. In the top left corner, a cartouche for the legend A-H featuring the Dutch Lion threatening the French Rooster with weapons.

However, the English troops assigned to Ouwerkerk's army were slow to arrive. On 9 May, while Marlborough and Obdam were still besieging Bonn, Villeroi and Boufflers advanced on Tongeren with 57 battalions and 103 squadrons. They knew that Ouwerkerk's forces were not yet at full strength due to the delayed English reinforcements and that his Dutch troops were scattered across their cantonments. Their aim was to overrun Tongeren and catch Ouwerkerk's army off guard. However, the two battalions stationed there managed to hold out for an entire day before surrendering, buying Ouwerkerk enough time to withdraw under the protection of Maastricht's guns. By the time the English troops finally arrived, his force had grown to 38 battalions and 71 squadrons.

Despite their significant numerical advantage, the French did not immediately press the attack, instead allowing four days to pass without action. This gave the Allies valuable time to strengthen their positions. However, unaware of the full size of the French force, Ouwerkerk had not fortified all locations equally. It wasn't until the night of 13 to 14 May that the French army advanced, but progress was slow due to darkness and heavy rain. By around seven o'clock, both armies were finally positioned for battle.

The right flank of the Allied position was anchored on the brook flowing past Lonaken into the Meuse, while the left was shielded by the artillery of Maastricht. In front of the left wing lay the village of Caberg, where a contingent of troops was stationed. Between Caberg and the right flank, the front line was bordered by a partially sunken road, with the remaining defences bolstered by hastily constructed entrenchments.

At first, the French seemed poised to attack the right flank, but around four in the afternoon, Villeroi judged an assault to be too risky and ordered a retreat. This decision dealt a significant blow to French morale and undermined confidence in their commanders. For the Allies, who had narrowly avoided a potentially disastrous defeat, this turn of events was tantamount to a victory. Ouwerkerk's leadership was widely celebrated throughout the army.

=== Promotion and independent command ===
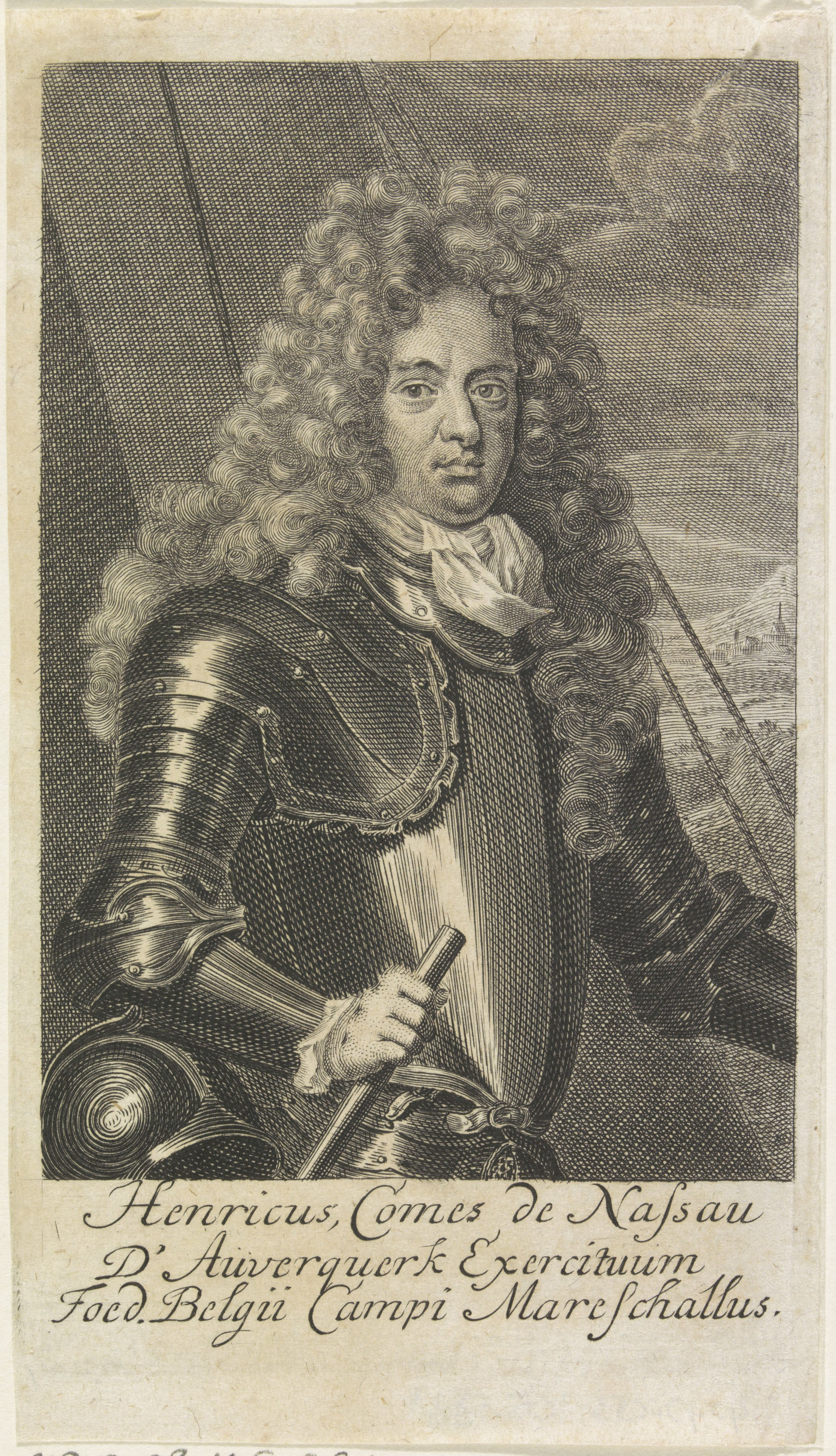
Portrait of Ouwerkerk.

After the capture of Bonn, it was decided to lay siege to Antwerp. Ouwerkerk joined Marlborough at the main army, whose task was to keep the main French force occupied. Meanwhile, Obdam, together with the renowned but notoriously difficult engineer-general Menno van Coehoorn, was assigned two smaller divisions with the task of breaking through the French lines and encircling Antwerp. On 27 June, Coehoorn's division succeeded in breaching the lines, but because Marlborough and Ouwerkerk failed to keep Villeroi's army occupied, a Franco-Spanish force surrounded Obdam's detachment. In the ensuing Battle of Ekeren, Obdam became separated from his troops, fled the battlefield, and sent word that his army had been annihilated. When it later became clear that General Slangenburg had preserved the force, Obdam fell into disgrace and was never again entrusted with command in the Dutch army.

This incident once again highlighted the poor relations between the various generals in the Allied army. Slangenburg and Coehoorn despised each other, while Count Noyelles also harboured a deep dislike for Slangenburg. Marlborough and Ouwerkerk, according to the Earl of Albemarle, did not get along at the start of the campaign either. Marlborough and Albemarle both agreed that waging war under these circumstances was impossible. Although the relationship between Marlborough and Ouwerkerk improved significantly, Ouwerkerk remained, according to Albemarle, highly stubborn and refused to take advice from anyone. Nicolaes Witsen wrote about the generals: "It resembles the wrath of Babel, in confusion and division of sentiments." Unsurprisingly, the rest of the campaign proved largely unsuccessful.

In August. The Duke of Marborough, dissatisfied with the gains made that year, hoped to be allowed to plan an attack on the fortified French lines defending Brabant. However, his proposal divided the council of war. The generals of the right wing of the army, supported Marlborough. However, the left wing of Ouwerkerk consisting mainly of Dutch generals, such as Dopff and Albemarle, was strongly opposed to they plan. The officers of the small army under Slangenburg also opposed the plan. Strong opposition and the fact that some of Marlborough's original supporters, cooled in their zeal ultimately meant that the Dutch field deputies did not feel able to give Marlborough permission to attack the French lines. Although Huy, Limbourg and Geldern fell into Allied hands, the Allies failed to bring Villeroi to battle and to break through the French lines.

For the 1704 campaign, the Dutch regenten finally appointed Ouwerkerk as Field Marshal. However, this decision once again caused friction among the Dutch generals. Slangenburg felt slighted because Ouwerkerk was not only a few months his junior in rank—a significant factor at the time—but also did not really outshine him in leadership skills or military achievements. As a result, Slangenburg refused to serve under Ouwerkerk's command. Other generals also threatened to leave the army but were eventually persuaded to stay. Only Coehoorn remained dissatisfied and offered his services to the army of Savoy. However, he died in March before his plans could be realised.

During the campaign of that year Marlborough marched with a part of the Allied troops to the Danube to support the Holy Roman Emperor and which would lead to the Battle of Blenheim. Ouwerkerk took command of the remaining troops in the Low Countries, but his campaign was constrained by cautious instructions from The Hague. The Dutch government, anticipating that the decisive front of 1704 would be in Germany, was reluctant to commit to major operations in the Netherlands and urged Ouwerkerk to avoid unnecessary risks. Meanwhile, his opponent, the Franco-Spanish commander Bedmar, had been ordered to maintain a defensive stance. As a result, neither side engaged in decisive action.

Ouwerkerk made three lacklustre attempts to break through the French lines and oversaw an ineffective bombardment of Namur. The most tangible Allied gain was the capture of Fort Isabella, though this victory held little strategic significance. While he succeeded in keeping French and Spanish forces occupied in the region, his overall lack of success led to mounting frustration within the Dutch army.

=== 1705 ===
In 1705, Ouwerkerk once again held overall command of the troops in the Low Countries. Meanwhile, Marlborough had led a contingent to the Moselle in an attempt to force a breakthrough, but his efforts proved futile. As Villeroi, with a considerably larger army than Ouwerkerk, laid siege to Huy, Marlborough abandoned his campaign on the Moselle and swiftly returned to the Low Countries with his troops and reassumed command. Huy fell after two weeks but was swiftly retaken. The Allies then refocused their efforts on breaching the French defensive lines guarding Brabant. Ouwerkerk commanded the left wing of the Allied army, which launched a diversion on 17 July, enabling Marlborough to break through the lines at Elixheim.

Following the breakthrough, Slangenburg, who had meanwhile rejoined the army, argued that the Allies should advance on Leuven. Securing the city was crucial for sustaining their logistics if they intended to capture Brussels and could potentially force Villeroi into a decisive battle. However, Ouwerkerk and Quartermaster General Daniël van Dopff opposed the plan, citing the exhaustion of the troops and the difficulty of bridging the Grote Gete. Marlborough did not challenge their judgment. Instead of advancing on Leuven, he opted for a wide flanking manoeuvre west of the French lines with 80,000 troops, aiming to cut Villeroi off from Brussels. This move, however, led to logistical difficulties, resulting in a month of frustrating manoeuvring. On 30 July, an attempt to cross the Dyle ended in failure.

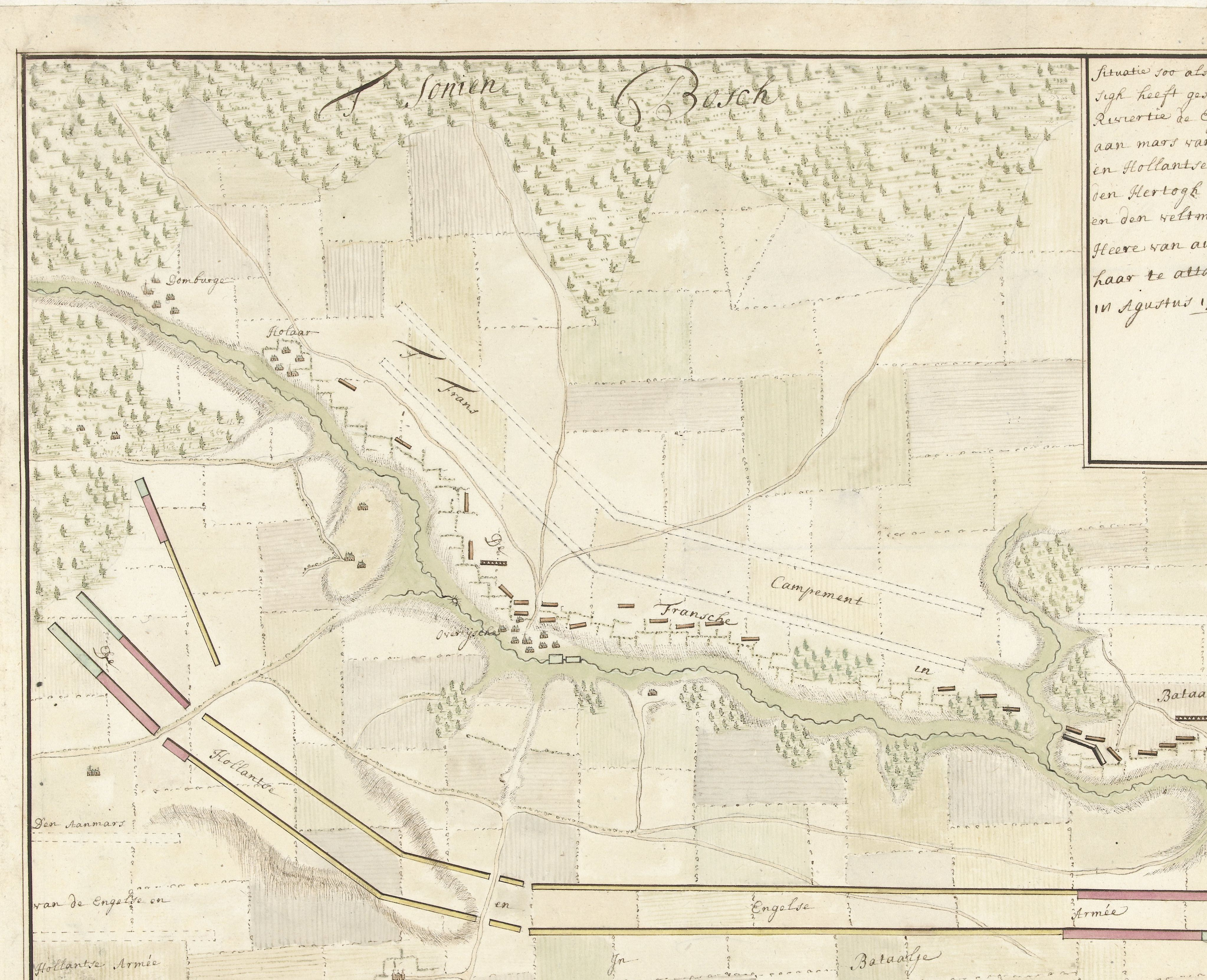
Map of the battle order in which the French army positioned itself behind the River Yse, opposite the Anglo-Dutch army under Marlborough and Ouwerkerk, 18 August 1705.

On 18 August, it seemed that Marlborough had finally succeeded in forcing Villeroi into battle near the village of Waterloo, at the Yse river. Despite the strength of Villeroi's positions, Marlborough argued in favour of an attack. Ouwerkerk was the only Dutch general who supported this plan. His subordinates, led by Slangenburg, viewed the French positions as too formidable. Compounding the issue, Marlborough's attempt at a flanking manoeuvre failed and caused significant delays. As a result, the plan for battle was ultimately abandoned. Once again, the campaign yielded little in the way of concrete gains.The most significant outcome of the affair at Waterloo, on the banks of the Yse River, was Slangenburg's dismissal from the army. Throughout his military career, he had only ever tolerated the leadership of King William III, and now that Marlborough demanded his departure, his position had become untenable.

Much of the tension within the Allied army during the 1702–1705 period stemmed from differing strategic priorities. Unlike France, the Dutch Republic did not possess two lines of fortresses, meaning that before the Battle of Ramillies—when much of the Spanish Netherlands fell into Anglo-Dutch hands, an Allied defeat in the field could have allowed the French to carry the war directly onto Dutch territory. This strategic vulnerability was a major concern for the Dutch generals and field deputies, whereas it weighed less heavily on Marlborough. England, in the event of a defeat, would suffer troop losses but did not face the threat of invasion. As a result, English commanders and those leading the subsidy troops were generally more willing to take risks than their Dutch counterparts.

=== Culmination of his career and death ===
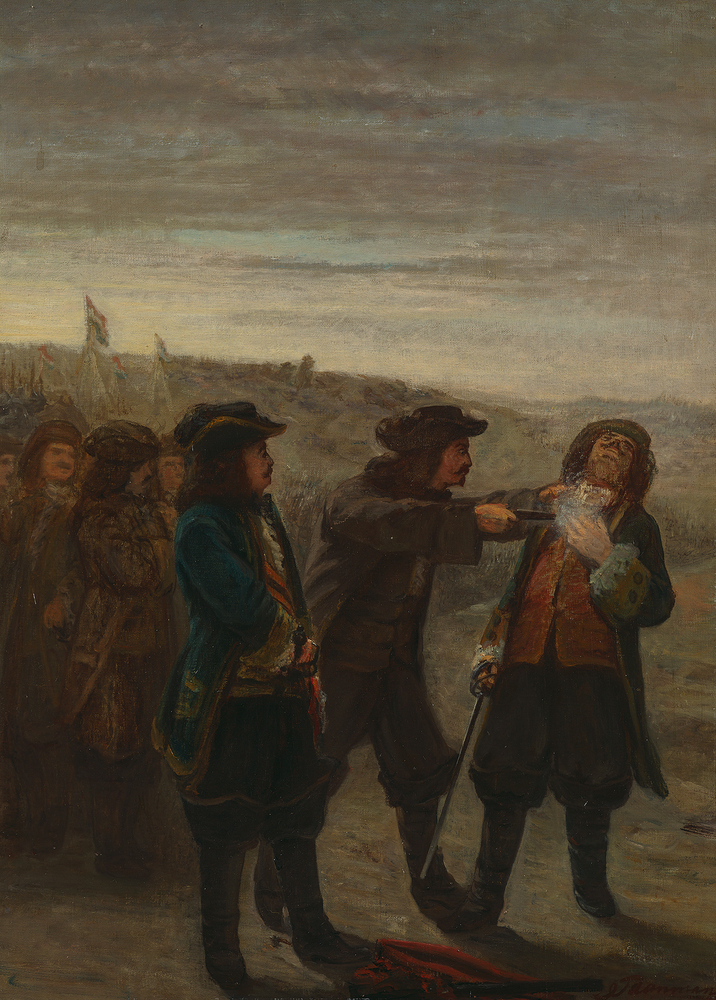
The murder attempt on Ouwerkerk

In 1706, Ouwerkerk and Marlborough again jointly commanded the Anglo-Dutch army in the Low Countries. Expectations for the campaign were low, as it was widely assumed that Villeroi would remain behind his defensive lines. However, on 19 May, Villeroi unexpectedly moved out of his fortifications to offer battle. Marlborough and Ouwerkerk advanced their forces and engaged the Franco-Spanish army at the Battle of Ramillies. Ouwerkerk commanded the left wing and directly led the cavalry. The battle was decided on this flank, where the Allied cavalry gained the upper hand. His leadership thus contributed significantly to the victory, which resulted in the rapid conquest of much of the Spanish Netherlands. During the battle, his generosity nearly cost him his life. When a Bavarian cavalryman surrendered, Ouwerkerk allowed him to keep his sabre. However, as Ouwerkerk turned away, the Bavarian attempted to stab him. An Allied cavalryman noticed just in time and shot the Bavarian, saving the marshal's life. After the Battle of Ramillies, Ouwerkerk successfully commanded the sieges of Ostend and Ath.

The 1707 campaign in the Low Countries was uneventful, as the French avoided battle and Marlborough made no effort to force an engagement, preferring to wait for the outcome of the assault on Toulon. For months, the opposing armies remained idle, facing each other without significant action. One of the few notable events of the campaign was Ouwerkerk's success in thwarting an attack on Brussels. On July 4, he learned of a French plan to set fire to the city's forage depot. Acting swiftly, he reinforced the garrison with two battalions—just in time. That same night, 150 French troops approached the city, but they were quickly discovered and fled immediately.

The 1708 campaign, by contrast, was one of the most remarkable and prolonged of the era, and Ouwerkerk once again played a significant role. At the Battle of Oudenarde, he commanded the 25,000 troops on the left wing, whose flanking manoeuvre decisively turned the battle in favour of the Allies. As with Ramillies, Dutch troops captured the most French flags and standards—trophies that were highly prized during this period as symbols of victory.

Sicco van Goslinga, one of the Dutch field deputies, recorded a remarkable scene that took place after the Battle of Oudenarde. Sensing that his end was near, Ouwerkerk ordered all the captured trophies from Oudenarde to be displayed in a hall:

I saw on one of those days a magnificent spectacle, which struck me by its singularity. The generals and colonels had been ordered to have all the flags, standards, and kettle-drums brought to the heads of the army, the Duke [Marlborough], the Prince [Eugene], and the Field-Marshal [Ouwerkerk]. [..] Ours were the greatest number. They were arranged as trophies around the walls of a long, spacious hall. The worthy M. Ouwerkerk, virtually moribund, was seated in his best clothes in a great armchair at the end at the end of the hall, surrounded by all these glorious trophies. I found him in this state one morning when I went there with Prince Eugene. The Prince was as much impressed as I was, and said to me that he was reminded of one of the old Roman generals displaying the spoils of a victory. In fact, nothing could be finer nor more striking.

He participated in the Siege of Lille (1708), but died just days before the city's capitulation on 18 October, having been bedridden for four days. The last order he signed abolished the use of pikes in the Dutch infantry, as they had once again proven ineffective during the Battle of Wijnendale. As commander of the Dutch forces, he was succeeded by Count Tilly. His death was a major blow for the Dutch army. Although Ouwerkerk lacked the prestige of Marlborough, he had been the undisputed Dutch military commander and had played a significant role in the victories achieved. In contrast, despite his achievements, Tilly remained completely overshadowed by the Duke of Marlborough and Eugene of Savoy and lacked the stature to assert himself as the leader of the Dutch generals.

== Legacy ==
Opinions on Ouwerkerk's career are mixed. While he is widely praised for his bravery and was a capable cavalry commander, some critics argue that he lacked the qualities needed for the highest command. Sicco van Goslinga, a contemporary, gave a particularly sharp assessment of the field marshal:

Field Marshal Ouwerkerk was the bravest and most magnanimous man in the world; he even exaggerated those qualities, and in his eagerness to fight as a soldier, he sometimes forgot that he was a general. Otherwise, he was as small-minded as could be, highly sensitive to criticism, and absurdly jealous of his authority—an authority he relinquished in important matters yet stubbornly upheld in trivial ones, entirely beneath the dignity of a general.

The mysterious anonymous Monsieur de B., who served in the Dutch army and in the guards of William III, was famous for his shrewd observations on Dutch politicians and military officers. He described Ouwerkerk in his memoires as a man:

of middling height, slenderly built, very well groomed, and somewhat affected in his manners. He had little aptitude for affairs of state, but was as brave as any man could be. He was so uninterested in personal gain that he never wished to ask anything for himself or his family. He had no ambition for honours and made no effort to obtain them. His intellect was rather mediocre. At times he was amiable, but he could also be extremely hot-tempered. Towards the end of his life this became so severe that he grew unbearable and almost fell into a kind of madness. He died amidst the armies, where his hand had always acted bravely.

British characterizations of Ouwerkerk are often more positive and historian Falkner mostly praised Ouwerkerk for his fruitful cooperation with Marlborough. He writes:

The way in which Marlborough and Overkirk worked so well together was notable, and an essential ingredient for the good of the combined Allied effort. With so many Dutch troops effectively under command of the Englishman, the confidence that Overkirk showed in the duke's competence and skilful direction of campaigns was essential for the cohesion of the Alliance. The cautious States-General in The Hague, who had so much at stake in the war and to whom Overkirk ultimately had to answer for his conduct and that of his troops, were reassured by this evident harmony. Some Dutch officers held a lingering sense of regret that the duke had been appointed to the command of the Anglo-Dutch army at all, and their cooperation was at times grudging. But the generally close accord between Marlborough and Overkirk was an example of how things should be done.

Dutch historian Jan Willem Wijn regards this rather as a lack of assertiveness. He writes:

... he would have been the designated mediator between Marlborough and the Dutch generals, but there is no evidence that he ever asserted himself in that role. Marlborough found in him a willing follower, and it was Slangenburg who acted as the spokesman for the Dutch generals in matters concerning their grievances.

And although he played an important role in the final years of his life, it is also said that his failing health left him with little strength. During the intense debate on whether the French positions along the Yse should be attacked on 18 August 1705, Ouwerkerk, for example, took the time to take a nap, and during the Battle of Oudenaarde, he was too weak to leave his coach.

Jan Willem Wijn described Ouwerkerk as representative of many generals of his time: "personally brave, but unfit to command an army."

== Family ==
See: Family tree Nassau-den Lek

The future Lord Overkirk married Frances van Aerssen van Sommelsdijck (died 1720), daughter of Cornelius, Lord of Sommelsdijk, at The Hague on 2 October 1667. They had eight children, including five sons, of whom two married and had children.

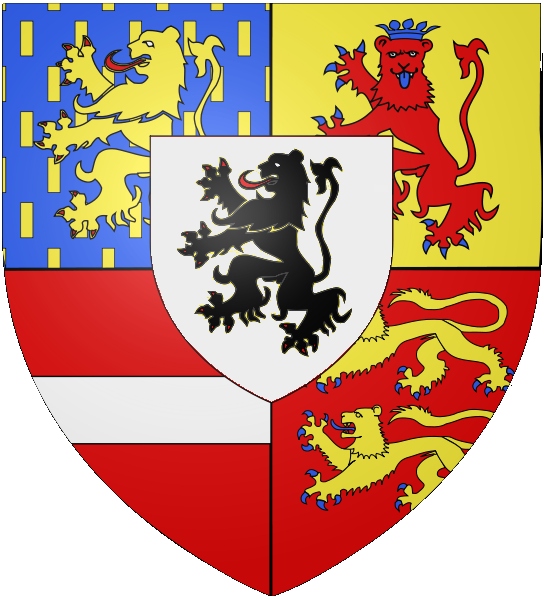
Arms of the Counts of Nassau-den Lek and Ouwerkerk.

Their children included:

1. Countess Isabella van Nassau (bapt. 20 April 1668, d.in childbirth on 30 January 1692 at London) married 10 March 1691, Charles Granville, Lord Lansdown, later 2nd Earl of Bath (bapt. 31 August 1661 – d. 4 September 1701 by suicide), widower of Lady Martha Osborne, daughter of the 1st Duke of Leeds, and son and heir of John Granville, 1st Earl of Bath. Her widower committed suicide on 4 September 1701, shortly after inheriting the peerage on 2 August 1701. He was buried with his father on 22 September 1701 at Kilkhampton. Her son, William Henry Granville (30 January 1692 – 1711), became 3rd Earl of Granville, but died young aged 19 of smallpox.
2. Lodewijk van Nassau (1669–1687)
3. Lucia van Nassau (1671–1673)
4. Henry Nassau d'Auverquerque, 1st Earl of Grantham (1673–1754) whose two sons both died in his lifetime, making his nephew Hendrik his heir as of 1730.
5. Cornelis van Nassau, Heer van Woudenberg (1675–1712), drowned at the Battle of Denain
6. Count Willem Maurits van Nassau, Heer van Ouwerkerk (1679–1753) who married his cousin Charlotte van Nassau (c. 1677–1708), and had issue one son and two daughters
  1. Count Hendrik van Nassau, styled Viscount Boston (1710 – 10 October 1735) who became heir to his uncle, the 1st Earl of Grantham, and as such was known as Viscount of Boston.
7. Frans van Nassau (1682–1710), died in the Battle of Almenar
8. Lucia Anna van Nassau (1684–1744) married 11 February 1705 Nanfan Coote, 2nd Earl of Bellomont, and had issue 1 daughter, Lady Frances Coote. She, in turn, married Sir Robert Clifton, 5th Baronet, of Clifton Hall, MP (1690–1767), and had one daughter Frances Clifton (d 8 November 1786) who married George Carpenter, 3rd Baron Carpenter, later 1st Earl of Tyrconnel (1723–1762) and had many children.

== Sources ==
- Van der Aa, Abraham Jacob (1867). "Hendrik van Nassau". Biographisch woordenboek der Nederlanden. Deel 8.
- Blok, P.J.; Molhuysen, P.C. (1911). "Nassau, Hendrik (Henry) van". Nieuw Nederlandsch biografisch woordenboek. Deel 1.
- Churchill, Winston (1936). Marlborough: His Life and Times. George G. Harrap Co. Ltd London.
- Falkner, James (2014). Marlborough's War Machine, 1702–1711. Pen & Sword Military. ISBN 9781473842953.
- Jongste, J. A. F. de; Veenendaal, A. J. (2002). Anthonie Heinsius and the Dutch Republic 1688-1720: politics, war. Institute of Netherlands History.
- Krämer, F.J.L. (1898). "Mémoires de monsieur de B.... ou anecdotes, tant de la cour du prince d'Orange Guillaume III, que des principaux seigneurs de la république de ce temps". Bijdragen en Mededeelingen van het Historisch Genootschap. 19.
- Knoop, Willem Jan (1867). Krijgs – en geschiedkundige geschriften. Deel 8 [Military and historical writings. Volume 8] (in Dutch). H. A. M. Roelants.
- Van Lennep, Jacob (1880). De geschiedenis van Nederland, aan het Nederlandsche Volk verteld [The history of the Netherlands, told to the Dutch nation] (in Dutch). Leiden; z.j.
- Nimwegen, Olaf van (1995). De subsistentie van het leger: Logistiek en strategie van het Geallieerde en met name het Staatse leger tijdens de Spaanse Successieoorlog in de Nederlanden en het Heilige Roomse Rijk (1701-1712) [The subsistence of the Allied and especially the Dutch army during the War of the Spanish Succession] (Thesis) (in Dutch). Universiteit Utrecht.
- Nimwegen, Olaf van (2020). De Veertigjarige Oorlog 1672–1712: de strijd van de Nederlanders tegen de Zonnekoning [The Forty Years War 1672–1712: the Dutch struggle against the Sun King] (in Dutch). Prometheus. ISBN 978-9-0446-3871-4.
- Wijn, J.W. (1956). Het Staatsche Leger: Deel VIII-1 Het tijdperk van de Spaanse Successieoorlog 1702–1705 (The Dutch States Army: Part VIII-1 The era of the War of the Spanish Succession 1702–1705) (in Dutch). Martinus Nijhoff.
- Wijn, J.W. (1959). Het Staatsche Leger: Deel VIII-2 Het tijdperk van de Spaanse Successieoorlog 1706–1710 (The Dutch States Army: Part VIII-2 The era of the War of the Spanish Succession 1706–1710) (in Dutch). Martinus Nijhoff.

Political offices
Preceded by Lord Dartmouth	Master of the Horse to William III; 1689–1702	Succeeded by In commission
Dutch nobility
Preceded by Title created	Lord of Ouwerkerk ?–1708	Succeeded by Maurice Louis II of Nassau-Lalecq
