= Siege of Lille (1708) =

1708 siege

- Part of the War of the Spanish Succession
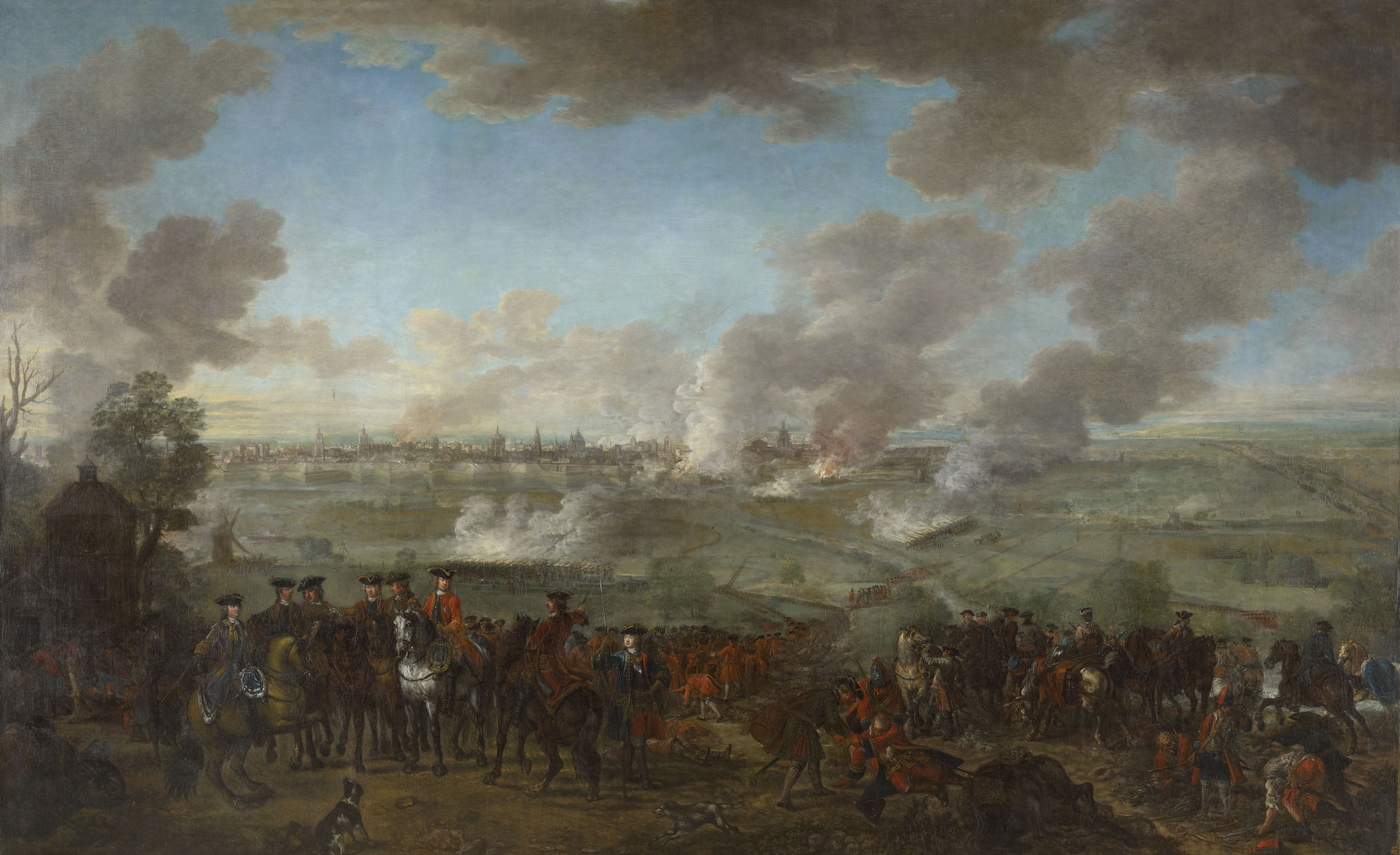
- The Siege of Lille; John Wootton, 1742
Date	12 August – 10 December 1708 (3 months and 4 weeks)
Location	Lille, France 50.6372°N 3.0633°E
Result	Grand Alliance victory

Belligerents
United Provinces; Great Britain; Habsburg Austria	France; Pro Bourbon Spain; Bavaria

Commanders and leaders
Besieging force (Habsburg monarchy) Eugene (Dutch Republic) Orange; Covering force (Kingdom of Great Britain) Marlborough; Ouwerkerk # Tilly	Garrison (Kingdom of France) Boufflers; Field army (Kingdom of France) Vendôme (Kingdom of France) Burgundy; Berwick; Maximilian II

Strength
35,000 besiegers, 120 heavy guns 80 heavy mortars 75,000 in vicinity	16,000 garrison, 159 guns 100,000 in vicinity

Casualties and losses
13,000–16,000 killed and wounded	7,000 killed and wounded 159 guns (Note: Per the terms of capitulation, the remaining unwounded garrison, about 9,000 strong, would retreat unmolested to the major French fortress and military depot of Douai. (Bodart 1908, p. 158)(Oury 2020, p. 275))

The siege of Lille (12 August – 10 December 1708) was the main operation of the 1708 campaign season during the War of the Spanish Succession. Following their victory in the Battle of Oudenaarde, the Allies decided to besiege Lille, an important French city and perhaps the strongest fortress in Europe. After an obstinate defence of 120 days, the French garrison surrendered the city and citadel of Lille, commanded by Marshal Boufflers, to the forces of the Duke of Marlborough and Prince Eugene of Savoy.

== Prelude ==
The Battle of Oudenaarde, fought on July 11, had created a complex strategic situation. The armies had fought with reversed fronts, meaning they now stood on each other's lines of communication. The French had retreated to Ghent and Bruges, needing time to recover from their defeat. However, by remaining inactive, the French Duke of Vendôme believed he still controlled the situation. As long as the French held Ghent, he thought the Allies would be unable to capitalize on their victory. Control of the city prevented them from using the Scheldt and Lys rivers to transport their siege artillery, ammunition, and supplies, making a siege of Tournai or Lille seem highly unlikely in his view. However, he underestimated the ingenuity of the Dutch field deputies. They solved the supply problem by requiring Flemish villages to deliver their grain reserves to improvised warehouses in Menen and Oudenaarde.

Meanwhile, the Allies were divided over which cities should be targeted following the battle of Oudenaarde. Bernaldo de Quirós, a Spanish nobleman who had sided with the Allies after the battle of Ramillies, proposed the siege of Mons and Charleroi to secure Brabant and clear the way to advance into France. Marlborough first insisted on conducting an operation along the coast and capturing Ypres. However, Eugene and the Dutch deputies found his plan too daring and favoured an attack on Lille. Eugene argued that the capture of this city was crucial for a successful invasion of France. Lille and Tournai were known as the "two eyes of France" because they controlled the two most important access routes to the northern French plains: the Lys and the Scheldt. Lille was connected to the Lys via the Deûle and to the Scheldt via the Scarpe. Next to this the Dutch deputies had other reasons for their preference for Lille. After its conquest by the French in 1667, the city had become one of the most important French cities and the wealthy city paid a large part of the French war chest. In addition, much of the booty captured by the Dunkirk Privateers from the allied merchant fleets ended up in Lille. A capture of this city would be a major blow to the French king.

Once the decision was made to besiege Lille, the first challenge was transporting the siege equipment to the site. This was a massive undertaking, as everything had to be moved overland across a distance of roughly 120 kilometers. The Allies assembled a logistical force of 16,000 draft horses and between 3,000 and 4,000 wagons and carts. It was only in early August that the convoy was finally ready to depart.

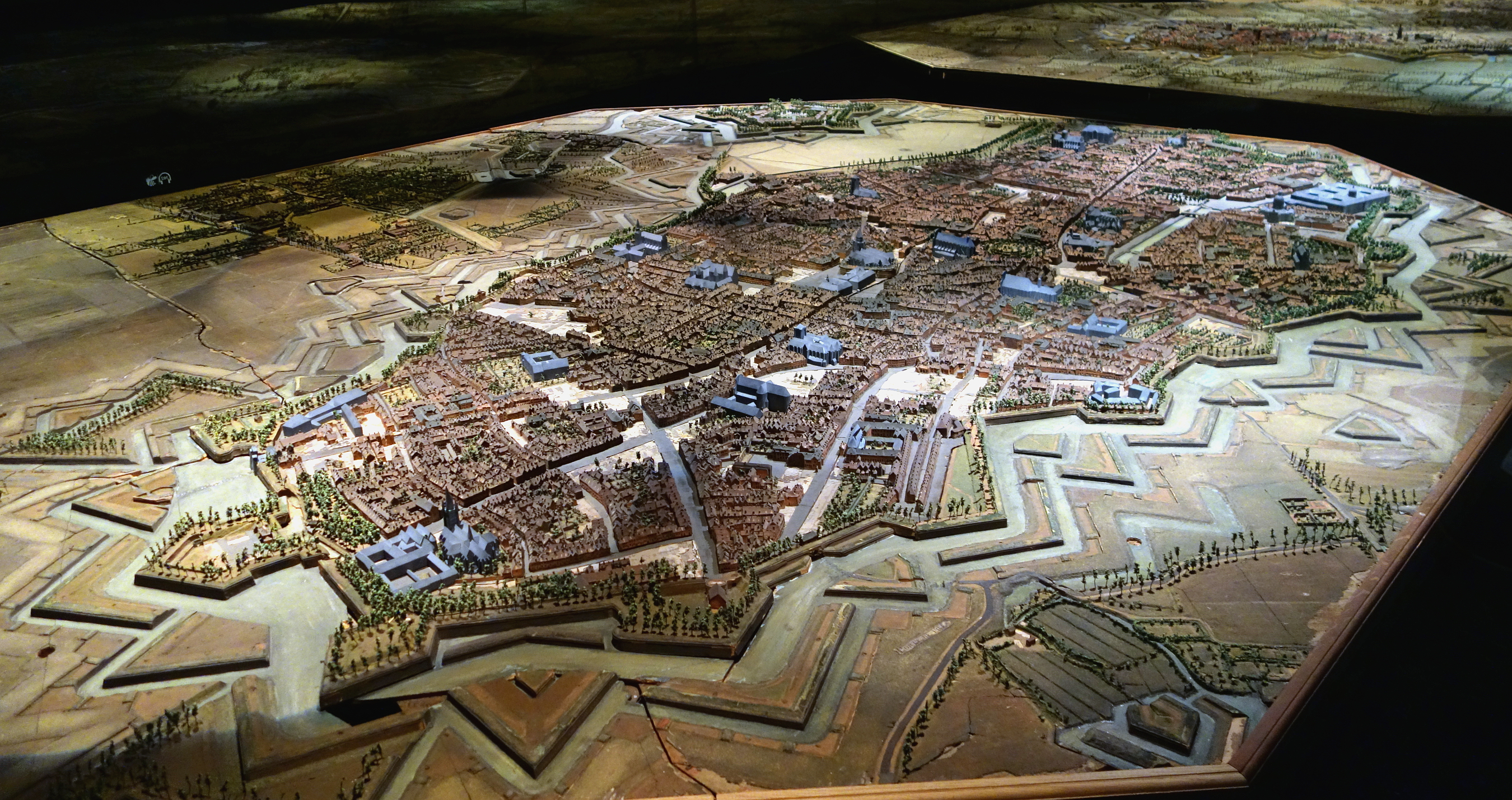
Plan-relief of the fortifications, comprising 16 bastions. The citadel is in the background.

The city had a population of 60,000, making it relatively large for the time. Since its capture in 1667, Louis XIV had significantly reinforced it through the work of the engineer Vauban. The main defensive line consisted of a wall with 15 bastions, ravelins, and four hornworks, all surrounded by wet moats and reinforced with high, heavy masonry walls. Additionally, at the point where the Deûle exited the city, there was a ravelin with two forward-facing tenailles, which would play a crucial role during the siege. As was customary, the entire fortress was encircled by a covered way with glacis, featuring small forts in the re-entrant angles, which served as defensive strongpoints. After the potential capture of the city, the siege of the citadel would follow—a fully fortified bastioned pentagon designed for maximum defense. Through inundation, a third of the city's fortifications could be protected, as well as the entire outer perimeter of the citadel, making it impossible to capture from that direction. These fortifications made Lille one of the strongest, if not the strongest, fortresses in Europe.

The Allies thus faced a massive challenge, even greater than the siege of Namur in 1695. The Duke of Boufflers commanded, just like he had done then, the 16,000 strong garrison. Boufflers had fallen out of favor after the campaign of 1703 and had not received a field command from Louis XIV since. The siege presented him with an opportunity to restore his reputation. Dupuy-Vauban, a nephew of Vauban, served as chief engineer. The city was well supplied with food and military provisions, and there was no shortage of funds. Boufflers also ensured careful registration and management of the stockpiles. The garrison could also count on significant support from the city's pro-French civilian population. While civilians were not allowed to take up arms, volunteer battalions were formed, providing valuable assistance in firefighting, transporting the wounded, and engineering tasks. To prevent the city from suffering a bombardment similar to that of Brussels in 1695, the Allies were bought off with 50,000 daalders and 400 bottles of the finest wine.

== Siege ==
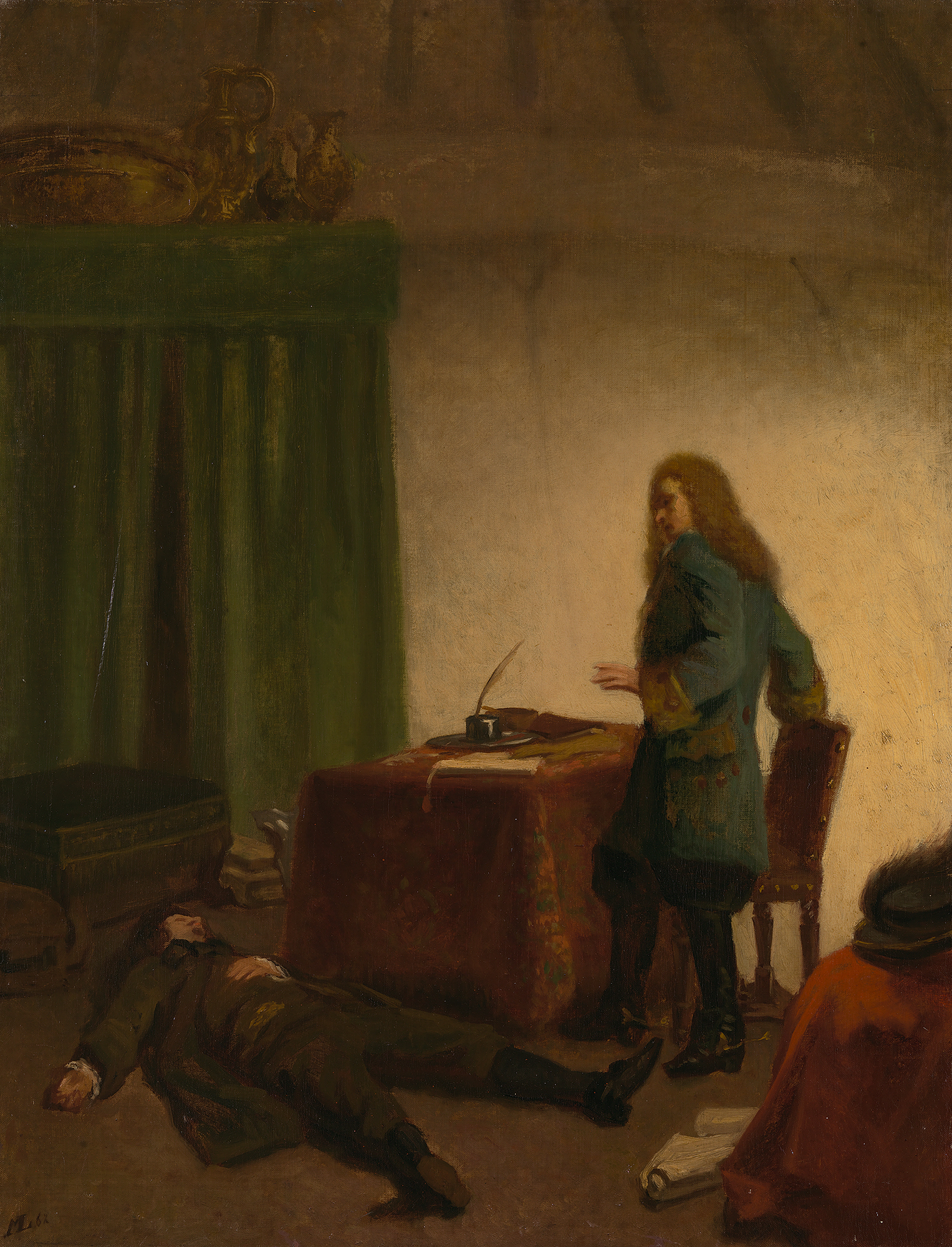
The chamberlain of the Prince of Orange is shot during the Siege of Lille.

Prince Eugene, who was given command of the siege operations, surrounded the city with approximately 40,000 troops on August 13. Meanwhile, Marlborough and the Lord of Ouwerkerk, with over 60,000 men, were tasked with covering the siege against the French field army, led by Vendôme and the Duke of Burgundy. The French general Berwick initially believed that the Allies would besiege Mons and thus failed to intercept the convoy. When he realized his mistake, he hastily sent reinforcements to the city. Eugene, with his Imperial troops, established his headquarters on the eastern side of the city, while the Prince of Orange, commanding the Anglo-Dutch troops, oversaw operations on the western side. Guillaume le Vasseur des Rocques and Lucas du Mée were appointed as the engineers responsible for directing the siege. Both served in the Dutch States Army, as the Dutch had the only large and experienced corps of engineers among the Allies and provided the entire siege artillery train.

On the 14th, the besiegers began constructing the circumvallation, while the defenders burned the suburbs and strengthened their fortifications. The Prince of Orange initially had initially set up his headquarters in the village of Lambersart. However, it was too close to the city and:

on the morning of August 18, a cannonball struck the building. While the prince was getting dressed, a cannonball entered through an open window, passing just five or six fingers' breadth from his face and decapitating his valet, du Cerceau, who was assisting him. The unfortunate man fell dead instantly, without uttering a sound. His blood and brains splattered onto the prince's robe and even reached the ceiling.

The prince then decided to move his headquarters further back.

=== Opening of the trenches and French relief attempt ===
On the night of August 22–23, the Allies opened their trenches, and four days later, the bombardment began. It lasted an entire day with unprecedented intensity, serving as a powerful demonstration of the strength of the Dutch artillery. The Dutch gunners aimed to breach the fortifications as quickly as possible, but since the covered way had not yet been captured, they were forced to fire from a great distance. Although several breaches appeared in the walls, the decision to bombard so heavily from afar was later criticized, as the strategic situation made the resupply of ammunition difficult.

In the following days, the Allied army made steady progress. However, by around September 6, the intensity of the assaults and bombardments had decreased. A large French army was approaching with the goal of relieving Lille, prompting the Allies to divert troops from the besieging force to reinforce the covering army. The French commanders were convinced from the start that they needed to relieve Lille, but Vendôme, Burgundy, and Berwick each had different opinions on how to achieve this. Berwick argued for a direct diversionary attack on Brussels, Leuven, Mechelen, and Lier, while Burgundy, supported by Louis XIV, favored a direct march on Lille. Vendôme, on the other hand, advocated waiting until the Allied trenches had been fully opened before making a move. Under pressure from King Louis XIV, it was decided that the 100,000-strong French army would march directly toward Lille. This meant that the threat to Brussels had diminished. Marlborough, quickly informed of the French plans, reinforced his army with troops from the garrison. Eugene had meanwhile also joined the field army.

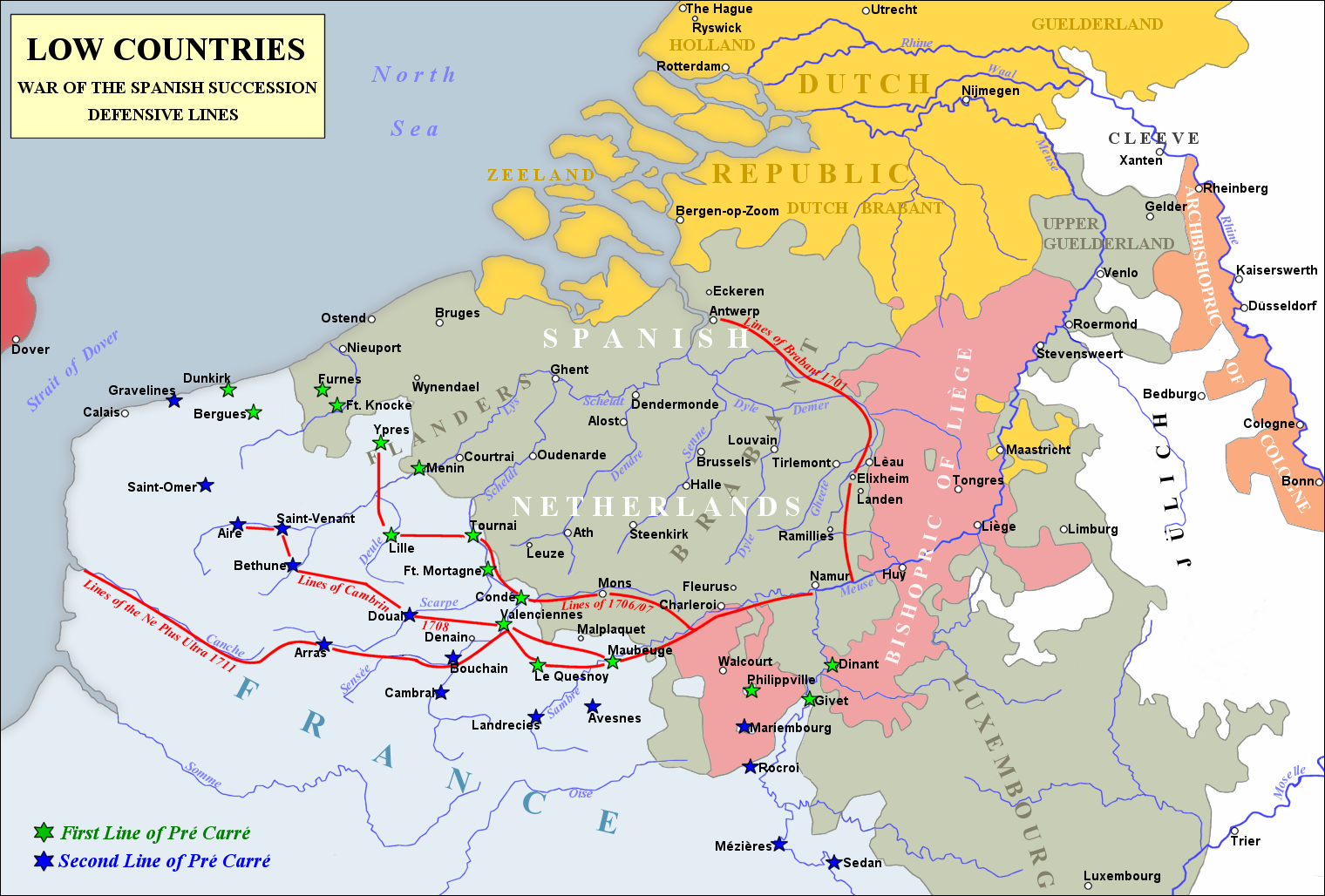
Campaign map of the Low Countries during the War of the Spanish Succession

On September 5, Marlborough and Eugene had their army in battle formation, expecting to engage the French at any moment. However, the French commanders were once again divided. Berwick advised against an attack due to the difficult and rugged terrain, while Vendôme was eager to launch an assault. For Vendôme, retreating would be a significant moral defeat, especially with the eyes of Europe focused on the armies surrounding Lille.

Burgundy was unable to make a decision, so it was decided to send a courier to Louis XIV to seek his judgment. Louis commanded that an attack should proceed. After two days in battle formation, the Allies had grown convinced that the French assault would not come, and by the 7th, Eugene had returned to the siege. The decision was made to launch an assault on the counterscarp. Despite the soldiers' bravery and exceptional discipline, the attack ended in disaster. While some ground was gained, the nearly 3,000 casualties were too high a cost for something that with more patience, could have been achieved through a few days of sapping.

On the 11th, the French army made another advance, forcing Eugene and Orange to reinforce Marlborough's forces once again, which further delayed the siege. However, despite this movement, the French still refrained from launching an attack. Initially, Vendôme had advocated for an assault, but as time passed, it became increasingly clear that, given the strengthened entrenchments of the Allied covering army and the low morale among the French troops, any attack would likely result in defeat. On the 15th of September, the French army withdrew.

=== Scheldt blockade and Battle of Wijnendale ===
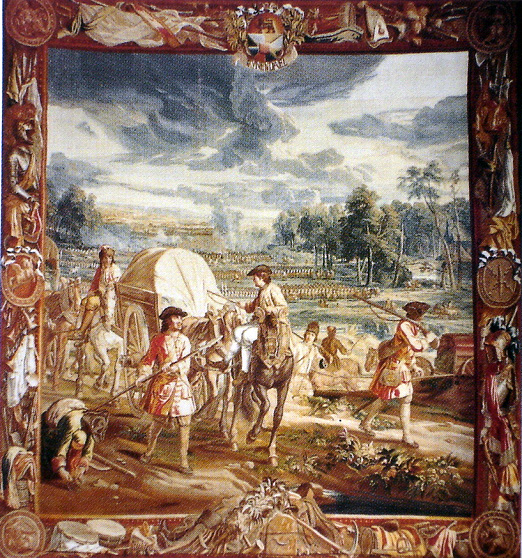
Tapestry representing the Battle of Wijnendale in Blenheim Palace, showing in the foreground the allied convoy, on the right Wijnendale Castle

The French commanders shifted to a new strategy, deciding to split their forces into a blockade line along the Scheldt, stretching from Ghent to Tournai. By doing so, they hoped to cut off the Allied supply of ammunition and force an end to the siege. The fruitless actions of the French army had, until now, mainly allowed the Allies to supply their besieging forces, which were increasingly facing a shortage of ammunition. Since the disastrous attack on September 7, murmurs of discontent had begun to spread within the besieging army due to the slow progress. Finally, on September 21, a large assault took place. However, this attack also resulted in heavy casualties with little ground gained. Eugene was among those wounded, and Marlborough temporarily took command of the siege. On the 23rd, he launched another major assault, but, like the previous one, it met with limited success.

The days that followed were the most critical of the entire siege for the Allies. Half of the engineers had been killed, along with many other troops, and there was a severe shortage of ammunition. The depots of Menen and Oudenaarde were empty by now and the supply lines had been cut off. Due to the slow progress, there were even suspicions that sabotage from within was occurring. Among the Dutch deputies, there began a debate about whether the siege should be abandoned.

That the siege was not called off was largely due to Eugene. He proposed shifting the supply line to Ostend, where a large convoy was preparing to depart for Lille. However, the French controlled the area around Ostend, posing a significant threat to the convoy. Marlborough, Ouwerkerk and Quartermaster generals Daniël van Dopff, and the Earl of Cadogan were thus all in favor of forcing the blockade line and deciding whether to continue the siege based on its success. However, Eugene firmly rejected this idea, and with the support of the majority of the Dutch deputies, it was decided to trust Eugene's judgment.

On September 27, the large convoy set off on its march. La Mothe, a French general who knew the West Flemish region well but was known for his mediocrity, was assigned the task of intercepting it with around 22,000 French and Spanish troops. However, on the 28th, they were stopped by an Anglo-Dutch force of 7,500 men under Major General Webb at the Battle of Wijnendale and forced to retreat. This surprising Allied victory allowed the convoy to reach Lille unhindered. This was a great Allied success, but the struggle for the convoys was not yet over, and to prepare for this, Marlborough moved his covering army further west on 29 September.

=== The gunpowder incident and the battle for the convoys ===
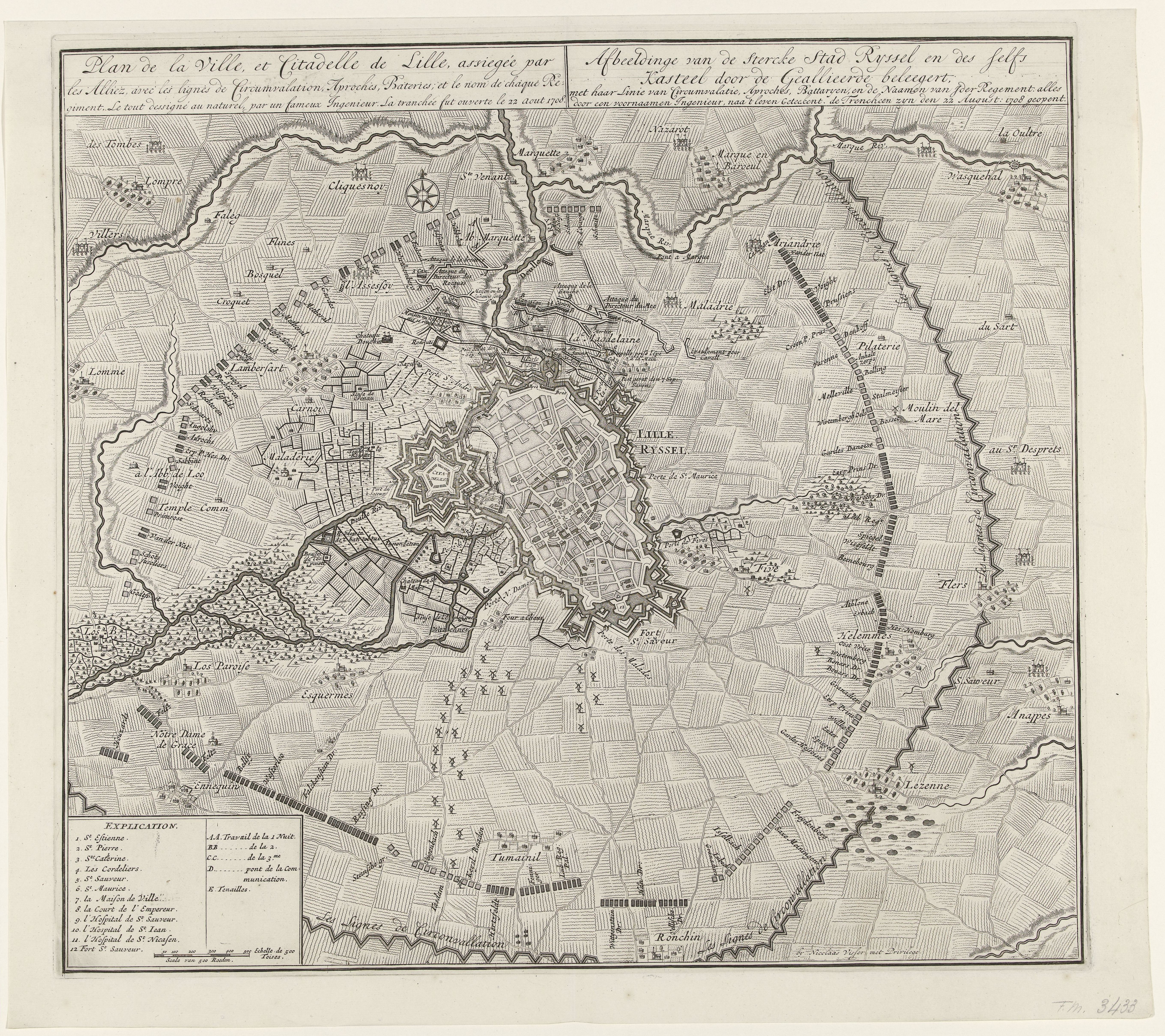
Map of the siege

Meanwhile, the garrison of Lille was also experiencing a shortage of ammunition. If they wished to continue the highly active defence they had maintained so far, they too needed to be resupplied. The circumvallation of Lille was only thinly manned by the Allies, as Marlborough deemed it necessary to maintain a sufficiently large covering army to counter the French field army. Sicco van Goslinga, one of the Dutch deputies, had repeatedly urged for the strengthening of the besieging force, but to no avail. Both viewpoints had merit, but the situation remained as it was, and it did not go unnoticed by the French. Christian Louis de Montmorency-Luxembourg, the son of the famed Marshal Luxembourg, seized upon this opportunity by planning a daring cavalry raid to supply the city with gunpowder. While similar attempts had been made in previous sieges, never before had such an operation been undertaken on this scale.

His plan was to deliver 100,000 pounds of gunpowder into the fortress using over 2,000 cavalrymen, each carrying a sack with 50 pounds of gunpowder and a musket. There was also a shortage of firearms by this point. On the night of September 29th his cavalry reached the Allied lines on the Imperial side. Disguised as Allied troops, they initially aroused little suspicion, and the leading riders passed through the lines without issue. As five regiments passed through, the Allied sentries finally realised what was happening. A brief but intense skirmish followed, during which Allied grenades successfully detonated two of the French gunpowder bags, causing massive explosions. Despite this, around 1,500 French cavalry, carrying nearly 50,000 pounds of gunpowder, managed to reach the city. Although half of the gunpowder never made it, the successful delivery was a significant boost for Boufflers, who was left with only 85,000 pounds of gunpowder remaining.

It had by now become clear to the French field army that to break the Allied siege of Lille, they needed to target the Allied supply lines. Given the French army's spread-out position along a long front, it was decided to avoid large-scale engagements with the Allies and instead make use of the geographical advantages of the coastal region. The route taken by the convoys had to be disrupted by inundations, as well as easily defensible posts along the roads and dykes. Large areas of West Flanders were flooded by the French, and it was only through the extensive use of fascines and small boats that the Allied convoys were able to reach Lille. There were also some small-scale attacks on various Allied positions, but initially with little success. However, on the night of 17–18 October, a French assault took place on the important redoubt at Leffinge. Although it was initially repelled, a garrison from another post withdrew to Leffinge when it was threatened with encirclement. This resulted in the complete severing of the connection with Ostend. The attacks on the exhausted Anglo-Dutch garrison at Leffinge continued relentlessly for several days, but Thomas Erle managed to hold the position. Meanwhile, the Dutch artillery had advanced so close to Lille that it had even established positions within the ruins of the city walls at several locations.

=== Surrender of the city, siege of the citadel and the attack on Brussels ===
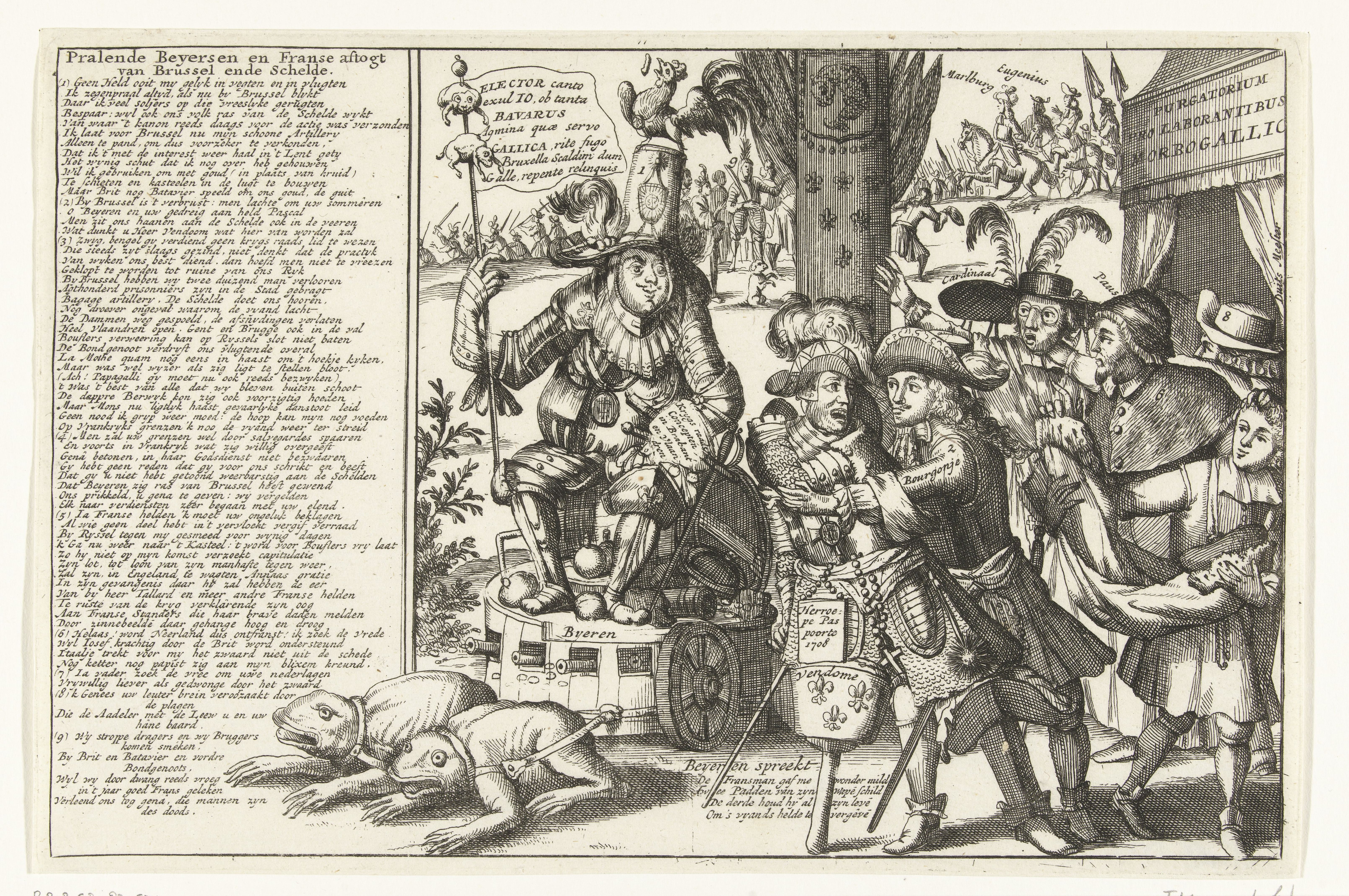
Caricature of the retreat of the Elector of Bavaria and the Duke of Vendôme, 1708. The Elector is depicted sitting on a chariot pulled by toads. Verses are included on the print in both Dutch and Latin.

The severing of the connection with Ostend came too late for the French and on 22 October Boufflers surrendered the city to the Allies under favourable terms for its defenders. He was granted permission to send the wounded, sick, as well as the soldiers' wives and children, to Douai, and he fortified himself with the remaining 8,000 soldiers of the garrison in the citadel. The Allies entered the city at the staggering cost of 12,000 casualties. Ouwerkerk, the esteemed 67-year-old commander of the Dutch army, did not live to witness the capitulation. Weakened by exhaustion, he died of natural causes on 18 October. (Note: Van Goslinga notes a remarkable scene during the final days of Ouwerkerk's life: I saw on one of those days a magnificent spectacle, which struck me by its singularity. The generals and colonels had been ordered to have all the flags, standards, and kettle-drums brought to the heads of the army, the Duke [Marlborough], the Prince [Eugene], and the Field-Marshal [Ouwerkerk]. [..] Ours were the greatest number. They were arranged as trophies around the walls of a long, spacious hall. The worthy M. Ouwerkerk, virtually moribund, was seated in his best clothes in a great armchair at the end at the end of the hall, surrounded by all these glorious trophies. I found him in this state one morning when I went there with Prince Eugene. The Prince was as much impressed as I was, and said to me that he was reminded of one of the old Roman generals displaying the spoils of a victory. In fact, nothing could be finer nor more striking.) He was succeeded by the Count of Tilly, a seasoned cavalry general with a proven track record. However, Tilly was not officially promoted to field marshal, as the Dutch regents feared that the provinces of Friesland and Groningen would demand that the Prince of Orange be granted the position instead.

Further negotiations on various matters continued until 28 October, after which the armistice came to an end. The citadel of Lille was considered one of Vauban's masterpieces, and capturing the it was a challenging task. Although the defenders were low on ammunition, the Allies were also forced to conserve their gunpowder, as their supply lines had been disrupted once again. The siege continued for a relatively long period, as the Allies sought to avoid the costly infantry attacks. It wasn't until 9 December, after 40 days, that Boufflers finally surrendered the citadel and the remaining defenders marched out with the honours of war. (Note: Specifically, the articles of capitulation drafted by Marshal Boufflers on 9 December and accepted by Prince Eugene were: The Lille citadel's chapel would not be used for the worship of any but the Catholic faith; Lille's garrison would exit the citadel with horse, arms and baggage; The garrison would traverse allied lines drums beating, bearing arms, and would carry in its train 6 cannons; Each French soldier would depart with 12 musket shot; French sick and wounded would be conducted to Douai at Allied expense (Brun-Lavainne 1838, pp. 343–4)) A final French attempt to relieve Lille, led by Maximilian of Bavaria with an assault on Brussels, had been thwarted. The determined resistance of the Brussels garrison, combined with the Allies' successful breach of the French blockade line, ultimately allowed them to force Maximilian to retreat.

== Aftermath ==
While the Allies had frustrated French attempts to relieve the strategically important fortress – the last substantial French bastion in Flanders – Boufflers' valiant defence had prolonged the siege well into winter and Boufflers was decorated by Louis XIV. The city's stubborn defence tied down the Allies for the remainder of the 1708 campaigning season, preventing them from advancing further into France. But, with the loss of Lille, northern Flanders reverted to Allied control; the Allies moved against Ghent, taking the city in late December and Brugge was soon captured too. The fall of Lille also opened a corridor for a further Allied advance into France in 1709.

With these actions, one of the longest and most eventful military campaigns of the era came to an end. Although the year had started poorly for the Allies with the French capture of Ghent and Bruges, the masterful generalship of Marlborough and Eugene, combined with the skillful management of supplies by the Dutch deputies, had reversed the situation. The French were defeated at Oudenaarde, Lille – one of the most important and strongest French cities – was captured, and Ghent and Bruges were reclaimed.

Although Vendôme's army was not decisively beaten and many strong fortresses were still in French hands, the Great Frost of 1709 brought further misery to the French. Additionally, the French treasury was severely depleted. Consequently, Louis XIV was prepared to make significant concessions in the negotiations that began in 1709. However, the Allies' heavy demands proved too great for Louis' pride, leading to the continuation of the war into the following year.
