= Adolf Hendrik van Rechteren, Lord of Almelo =

Dutch nobleman, diplomat, and statesman

Adolf Hendrik van Rechteren
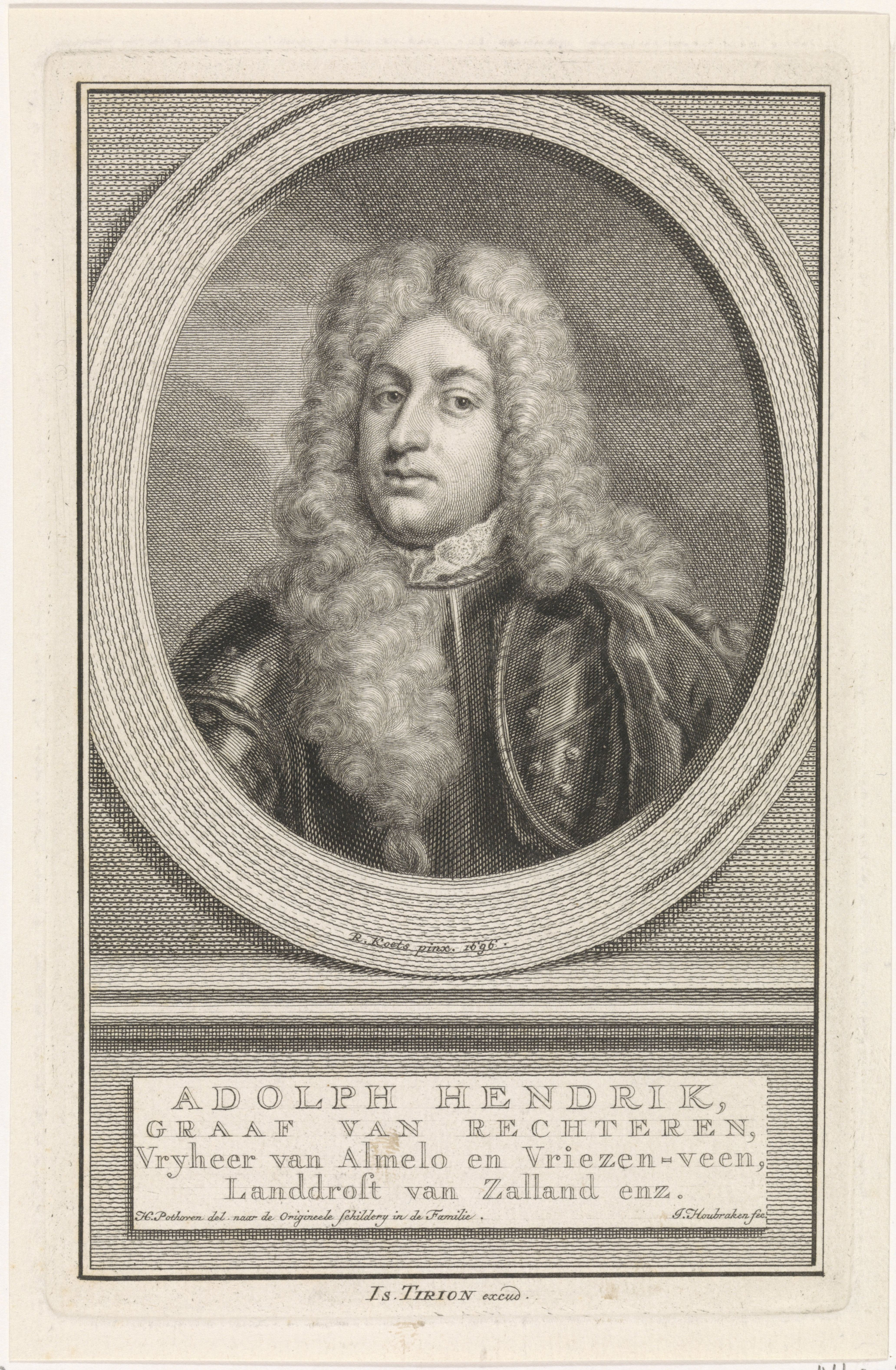

Personal details
- Born: 10 March 1656 Zwolle, Dutch Republic
- Died: 15 March 1731 (aged 75) Almelo, Dutch Republic
- Occupation: Nobleman, diplomat, politician

Adolf Hendrik van Rechteren, Lord of Almelo (10 March 1656 – 15 March 1731) was a Dutch nobleman, diplomat, and statesman from Overijssel. A member of the influential Van Rechteren family, he served as representative of his province in the States General and later as Dutch envoy to the imperial court in Vienna. In 1705 he was elevated to the rank of Count by Emperor Leopold I. He served as field deputy in the Dutch States Army in 1702, 1703 and 1708.

== Early life ==
Van Rechteren was born in Zwolle to Joachim Adolf van Rechteren and Margaretha van Haersolte. He enrolled at Leiden University on 6 October 1673 to study law. Upon the death of his father in 1674 he inherited the lordship of Almelo.

== Career ==
In 1680 Van Rechteren took his seat in the Landdag of Overijssel as representative of the nobility. The following year he was appointed to the Admiralty of the Meuse, one of the five Dutch admiralties. He was active in provincial politics and was later chosen as one of Overijssel's commissioners to the States General in The Hague.

During the War of the Spanish Succession in 1703 he was appointed extraordinary envoy to the associated Imperial Circles, and he remained accredited to several minor German courts until 1712. In 1705 he was sent to Vienna to convey the Republic's greetings to the new Emperor Joseph I and to assist in efforts to pacify the revolt of the Hungarians staying there until 1707. In October 1705 the Emperor elevated him to Count of the Holy Roman Empire. From 1707 to 1712 he served as Dutch envoy to the imperial court in Vienna, where he represented the interests of the Dutch Republic in matters relating to the ongoing war and the succession of the Spanish crown.

In 1704, in the lead up to the Battle of Blenheim he would come to play an important role. He made sure that on their 450-kilometre-long march, the Allies would nowhere be denied passage by local rulers, nor would they need to look for provisions, fodder for their horses or new boots. He also saw to it that enough stopovers were arranged along the way to ensure that the Allies reached their destination in good condition.

In 1712 Van Rechteren served as one of the Dutch delegates at the Peace of Utrecht, but a quarrel between his servants and those of a French plenipotentiary led Louis XIV to demand satisfaction, after which he was recalled. In 1714 and 1715 he was one of the four representatives of the States General who negotiated in Antwerp over the Barrier Treaty.

Within his home province of Overijssel, Van Rechteren played a dominant political role, particularly in the Ridderschap (nobility) and the provincial States. He belonged to the circle of leading regents with whom Anthonie Heinsius, after the death of William III of Orange, frequently consulted. In foreign policy he consistently advocated maintaining close relations with the emperor; in domestic affairs he was the driving force behind the Great Assembly of 1716, which he also opened, though its results fell short of his hopes.

When the William IV, Prince of Orange was appointed stadtholder of Gelderland in 1722, Van Rechteren became one of the most determined opponents of further expansion of princely power. In 1724 an Orange-minded faction emerged within the Ridderschap that sought to undermine his influence, but he ultimately managed to retain his position until his death. He was buried in the Reformed Church of Almelo, where his fine marble tomb still survives.

== Family ==
Van Rechteren married on 8 February 1695 to Sophia Juliana, Countess of Castell-Rüdenhausen (1673–1742). The couple had several children, and their descendants continued to hold prominent positions in the eastern Netherlands.

== Sources ==
- "Adolf Hendrik van Rechteren". Wie is Wie in Overijssel.
- "Rechteren, Adolf Hendrik van". Nieuw Nederlandsch Biografisch Woordenboek. DBNL.
- Nimwegen, Olaf van (2020). De Veertigjarige Oorlog 1672–1712 [The Forty Years War 1672-1712: the Dutch struggle against the Sun King] (in Dutch). Prometheus. ISBN 978-90-446-3871-4.
