= Battle of Leuze =

1691 battle of the Nine Years' War

- Part of the Nine Years' War
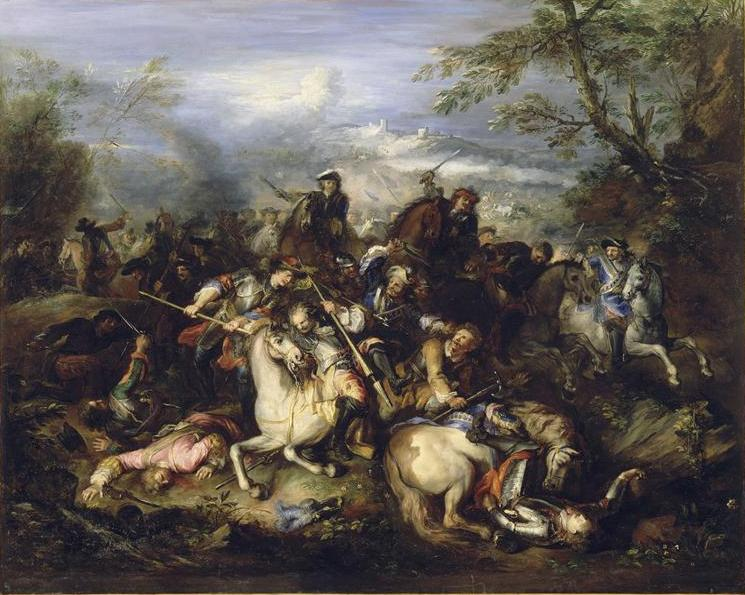
- Combat de Leuze by Joseph Parrocel
Date	18 September 1691
Location	Leuze-en-Hainaut, present-day Belgium
Result	French victory

Belligerents
France	Dutch Republic; England; Scotland

Commanders and leaders
(Kingdom of France) Duke of Luxembourg (Kingdom of France) Villars	(Dutch Republic) Count of Waldeck (Dutch Republic) Count of Tilly (Dutch Republic) Prince of Nassau-Usingen (Dutch Republic) Lord Overkirk

Strength
28 squadrons (about 4,000 men)	72 squadrons (about 12,000 men)

Casualties and losses
400–700 killed or wounded	1,500–2,000 killed, wounded or missing

The Battle of Leuze was a large Cavalry engagement of the Nine Years' War that took place on 18 September 1691 between a detachment of French and a superior Allied force.

Marshal Luxembourg had been informed that William III of Orange had left for England, in the supposition that the campaign of 1691 was at its end. He was also informed that Marshal Waldeck, who was left in charge, was preparing to retire into winter quarters.

Luxembourg was near Tournai and sent out a reconnaissance under Marsilly, from whom he learned that the main body of the Allied army was retreating, leaving a rear-guard of cavalry, consisting of just 3,000 men, under the Count of Tilly at Leuze. Luxembourg acted immediately. He sent a detachment to follow the movements of the main body, and with the squadrons of Villars and Marsilly he attacked the smaller party without warning. The French cavalry charged, only using their swords.

As soon as Field Marshal Nassau-Saarbrücken-Usingen became aware of the French attack, he turned around with the entire left wing and tried to turn the tide. This further increased Allied losses, because the squadrons which rushed to the rescue did not all arrive on the battlefield at the same time, allowing the elite French troops to defeat them one by one. Troops under Overkirk, however, were finally able to chase off the French cavalry. Waldeck, meanwhile, rushed with the infantry to Leuze, but blew off the attack when Luxembourg saw him approaching.

The Allied infantry, including Mackay's Regiment also took part in the battle but did not see much action.

== Sources ==
- Van Nimwegen, Olaf (2020). De Veertigjarige Oorlog 1672–1712: de strijd van de Nederlanders tegen de Zonnekoning [The 40 Years' War 1672–1712: the Dutch struggle against the Sun King] (in Dutch). Prometheus. ISBN 978-90-446-3871-4.
- Ten Raa, F.J.G. (1950). Het Staatsche Leger: Deel VII (The Dutch States Army: Part VII) (in Dutch). Martinus Nijhoff.
- Gillespie, Alexander (2021). The Causes of War: Volume IV: 1650 - 1800. Bloomsbury Publishing.
- Zabecki, David T. (2014). Germany at War: 400 Years of Military History [4 volumes]: 400 Years of Military History. ABC-CLIO.
- Tucker, Spencer C. (2014). 500 Great Military Leaders [2 volumes]. ABC-CLIO.
- Lynn, John (1999). The Wars of Louis XIV, 1667–1714 (Modern Wars in Perspective). Longman. ISBN 978-0582056299.
- DK (2009). War: The Definitive Visual History. Penguin.
- Sokolov, Oleg (2020) [1999]. Армия Наполеона [Army of Napoleon] (in Russian) (2 ed.). Moscow: Яуза-каталог. ISBN 978-5-00155-024-2.

Deschard B. Le combat de Leuze. // Histoire, Économie et Société, 1996, № 1. Louvois. pp. 147–154
