= Claude Frédéric t'Serclaes, Count of Tilly =

Dutch States Army officer (1648–1723)

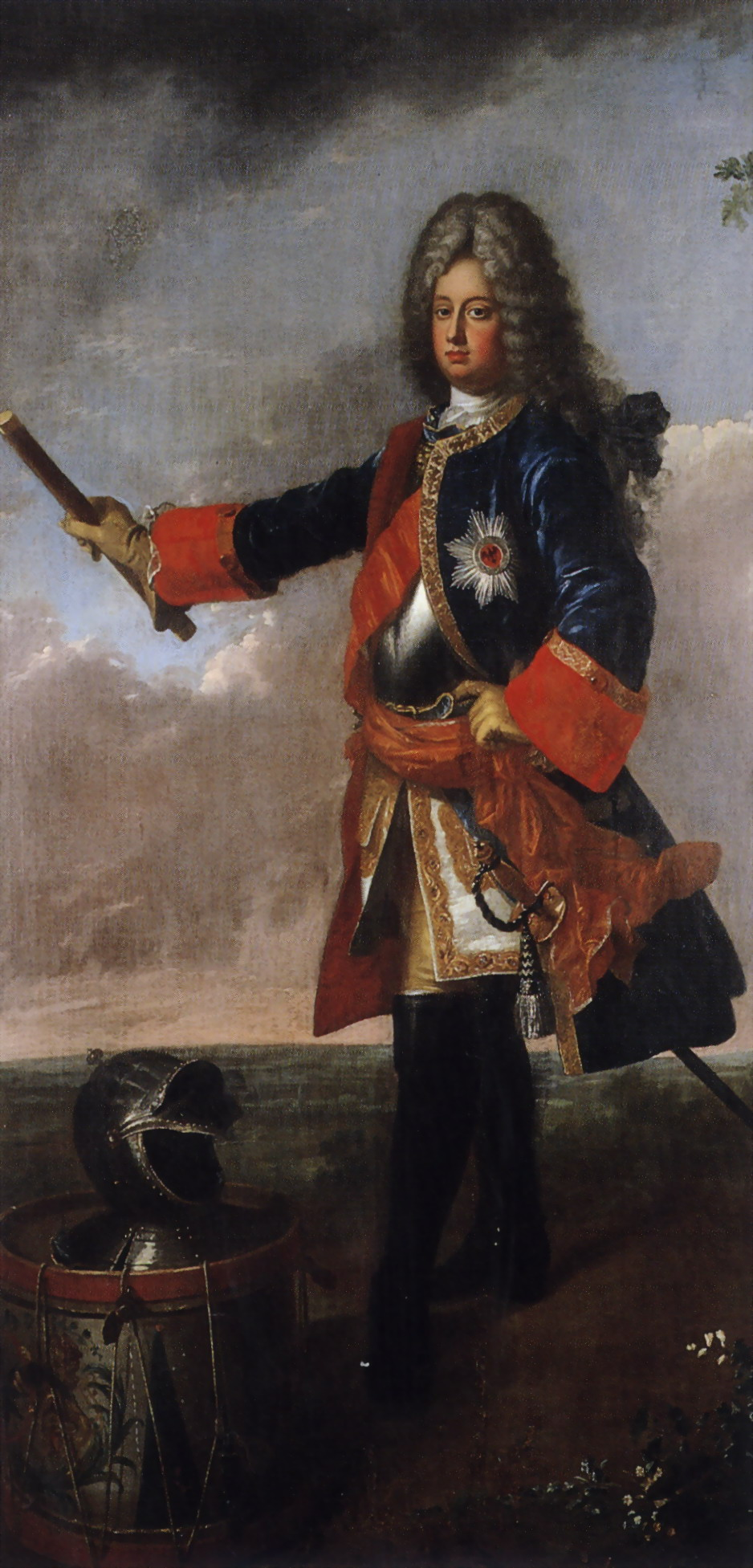
- Portrait by Johann Valentin Tischbein, c. 1750
- Born: July 1648; Brussels, Spanish Netherlands
- Died: April 1723 (aged 74); Maastricht, Dutch Republic
- Burial place: Basilica of Saint Servatius, Maastricht
- Military career
- Allegiance: Spain (1667–1672); Dutch Republic (1672–1723)
- Branch: Dutch States Army
- Service years: 1667–1723
- Rank: Field marshal
- Conflicts: War of Devolution; Franco-Dutch War; Siege of Maastricht (1673); Battle of Seneffe; Siege of Maastricht (1676); Battle of Cassel; Battle of Saint-Denis; Nine Years' War; Battle of Walcourt; Battle of Leuze; Battle of Steenkerque; Siege of Namur; Bombardment of Givet; War of the Spanish Succession; Assault on Nijmegen; Siege of Venlo; Battle of Ekeren; Passage of the Lines of Brabant; Battle of Ramillies; Battle of Oudenarde; Crossing of the Scheldt; Siege of Ghent; Battle of Malplaquet; Siege of Douai; Siege of Bouchain

Field Marshal Claude Frederic t'Serclaes, Count of Tilly (July 1648 – April 1723) was a Dutch States Army officer who served in the Franco-Dutch War, Nine Years' War and the War of the Spanish Succession. A brave and capable cavalry general, in 1708 he became the de facto supreme commander of the Dutch army and led the Allied forces together with the Duke of Marlborough and Eugene of Savoy.

== Early life ==
He was born in 1648 to Jean Werner T'Serclaes Tilly Marbais and Marie Françoise de Montmorency Robecq. He was a younger brother of Albert Octave who served Philip V of Spain, which would pit them against each other during the Battle of Ekeren. The grandfather of these brothers was a younger brother of Johann Tserclaes, Count of Tilly of the Thirty Years War. In 1667 Tilly entered Spanish service, but switched to Dutch service in 1672, even though he was a Catholic.

== Early Wars ==
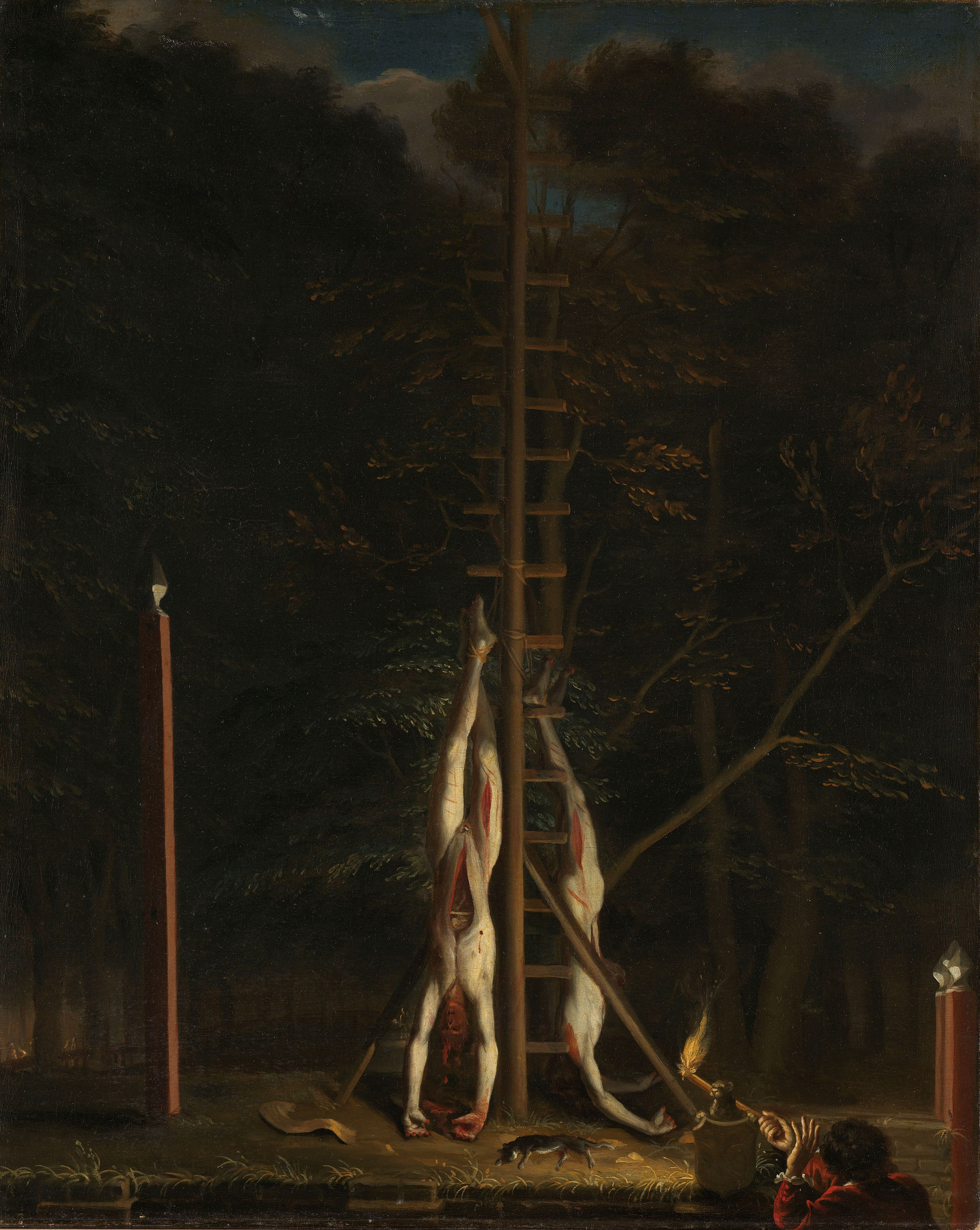
The Corpses of the De Witt Brothers

In 1672, during the Rampjaar, he was stationed in The Hague with a number of horsemen. There he tried to stop the murder of Cornelis de Witt and Johan de Witt by an angry mob, but was ordered to retreat. An order he very reluctantly followed. "I will obey," Tilly spoke, "but now the De Witts are dead men." It is possible that Tilly enlarged his role in this event during the Second Stadtholderless Period, but if true, this controversial incident seems to indicate that the lynching was prepared by Orangists from higher up and was not a spontaneous affair. Tilly would harbor anti-orangist feelings for the rest of his life. This while most of the officers and soldiers in the army were Orangists.

In 1673, under the orders of de Fariaux, he took part in the defence of Maastricht against Louis XIV and was seriously wounded. In 1674, serving under William of Orange, he was again seriously wounded at Seneffe. After the battle, where he fought for two hours before being wounded by a shot to the face, the bullet lodging in his neck for the rest of his life, Count Tilly was left among the fallen, his rich attire and weapons stripped by looters. By chance, the steward of William of Orange passed by, noticing signs of life in the wounded count, though he remained unrecognized. Orders were swiftly given to transport him to a hospital in Mons, where he lingered for three days, teetering between life and death, receiving care as an unknown soldier due to his lack of identification and stripped possessions. It wasn't until a rosary bearing his coat of arms was found that his true identity was revealed. When he was recognized, he received proper treatment and, in due time, recovered to resume his military duties.

In 1675 he was present at the capture of Binche and the next year he took part in the Siege of Maastricht. At the Battle of Cassel, in 1677, Count Tilly successfully safeguarded seven battalions of infantry and two cavalry companies by decisively defeating six squadrons of elite French cavalry, compelling them to retreat in disarray. In addition to capturing multiple French officers during the same encounter. In 1678 at the Battle of Saint-Denis; Tilly took part in the attack on Casteau. Despite sustaining injuries, his brave conduct warranted his promotion to colonel of a regiment of cavalry.

In the following Nine Years' War he was present at the battle of Walcourt. In 1691, promoted to major general, his rear-guard of cavalry, consisting of just 3,000 men, was attacked in the Battle of Leuze by a larger force under Villars and Marsilly. The fight went badly for the Allied cavalry until reinforcements under Hendrik van Nassau-Ouwerkerk eventually managed to push the French back. In 1692 he fought at the Battle of Steenkerque. Three years later he was made lieutenant general of the cavalry.

== War of the Spanish Succession ==
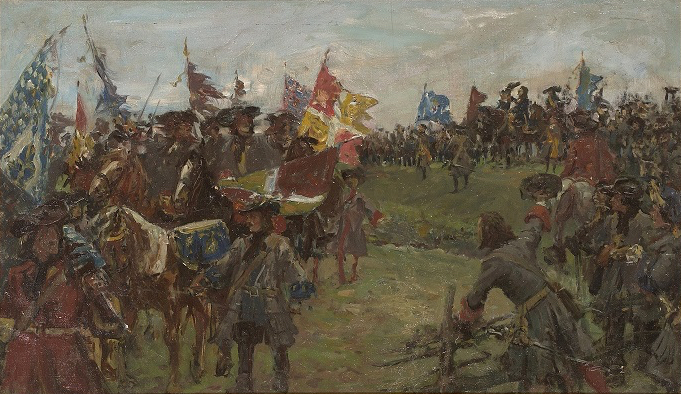
Parade of Dutch soldiers with captured French and Bavarian banners after the Battle of Ekeren, by Jan Hoynck van Papendrecht

In the spring of 1702, at the start of the War of the Spanish Succession he was placed with a small army around the German city of Xanten. The French under Boufflers tried to ambush him there with a superior force but Tilly narrowly escaped the maneuver and united his forces with those of the Earl of Athlone. An act which earned him much praise. Under Athlone the combined army was then able to prevent the fall of Nijmegen.

The following year he served under Jacob van Wassenaer Obdam near Antwerp and fought in the Battle of Ekeren. Their small Dutch force was surrounded by a much larger Franco-Spanish army and Obdam fled, thinking his army was destroyed. The Lord of Slangenburg and Tilly however took over command and managed to force back the Franco-Spanish troops and break the encirclement. During this battle Tilly's older brother commanded a corps on the Franco-Spanish side.

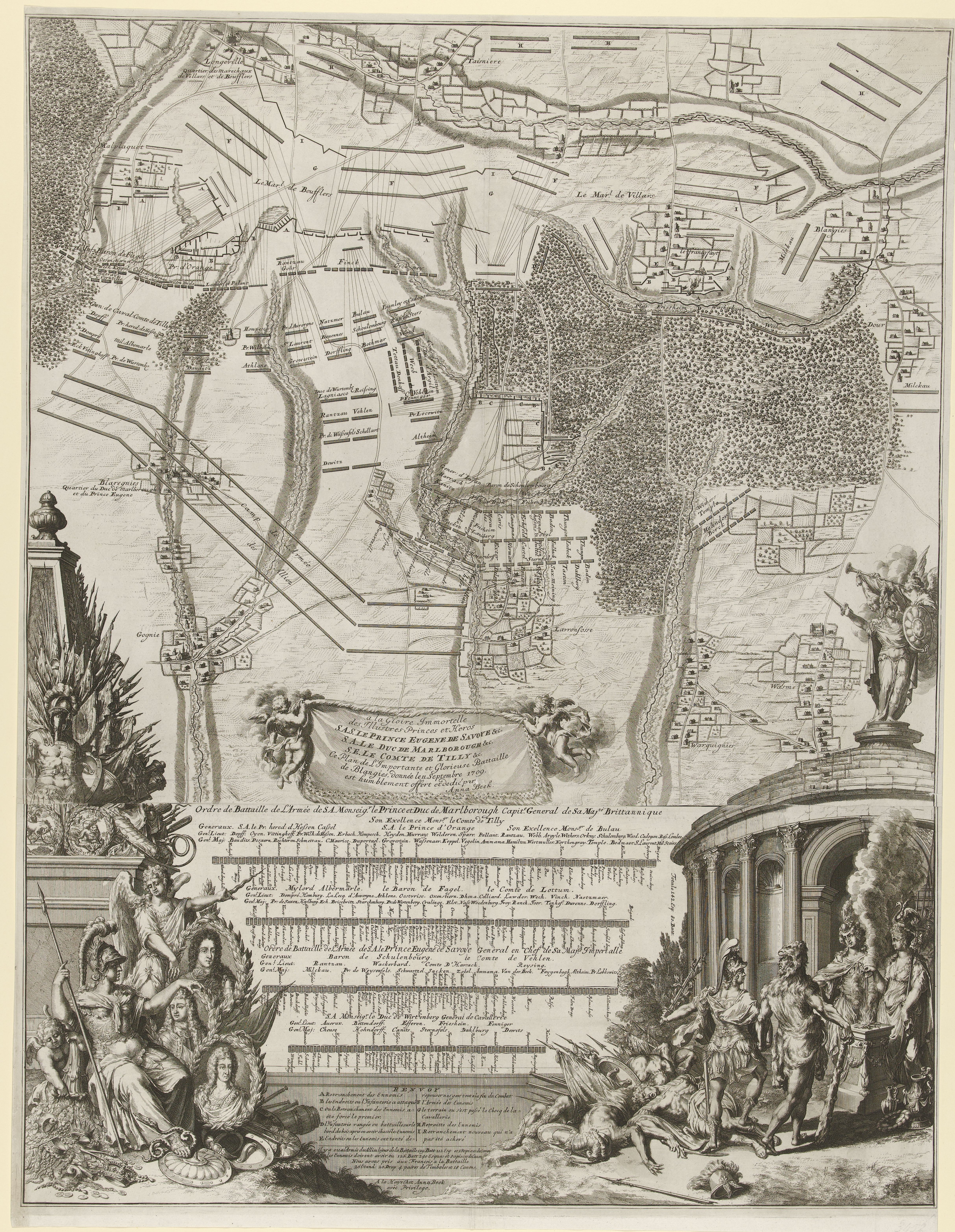
Allied battle order at Malplaquet. Tilly is mentioned as one of the supreme commanders.

In the ensuing campaigns, Tilly served under Ouwerkerk and became general of the Dutch cavalry in 1704, proving to be one of the most skilful and dependable cavalry commanders of the Allied army. He took part in the Battle of Ramillies and the Battle of Oudenarde and played a very important role during both battles. When field marshal Ouwerkerk died in 1708, during Siege of Lille, Tilly became de facto supreme commander of the Dutch army in the Netherlands. The Dutch States General didn't promote him to that position officially, because that would offend the Frisians and Groningers who wanted their stadtholder, John William Friso, the Prince of Orange, in that position. Tilly did not possess the authority that Ouwerkerk had enjoyed. Although Ouwerkerk lacked the prestige of Marlborough, he had been the undisputed Dutch military commander and had played a significant role in the victories achieved. In contrast, despite his achievements, Tilly remained completely overshadowed by the Duke of Marlborough and Eugene of Savoy and lacked the stature to assert himself as the leader of the Dutch generals.

Together with Marlborough and Eugene, as head of the Dutch forces, Tilly defeated the French at Malplaquet. Tilly led the entire left wing, at least in name; for he had anti-orangist sympathies, while his officers were largely on the side of the Prince of Orange, and obeyed him more than they obeyed Tilly. Tilly thus seems to have had little tactical influence throughout the battle. He didn't participate in the Dutch infantry assault led by the Prince of Orange, although he was heavily involved in the cavalry action in the latter stage of the battle. The Dutch army suffered very heavy casualties that day, with 10,000 men killed or wounded. After the battle, Tilly tasked himself with finding the wounded who still lay on the battlefield and drew up a detailed list of the Dutch casualties.

In 1710 he and Marlborough again commanded the Anglo-Dutch army. Combined with the army of Eugene of Savoy, it was larger than ever before, totalling 165,000 men. The campaign was accompanied by many difficulties, but the allies managed to capture Douai, Béthune, Saint-Venant and Aire. Still, success was limited. The Allies had failed to penetrate the French fortress ring despite all their efforts. The following year, Eugene and most of the Imperial troops were recalled from the Spanish Netherlands. The combined Anglo-Dutch field army under Marlborough and Tilly, consisting of 100,000 men, was smaller than last year's and now only able to capture Bouchain.

Sicco van Goslinga, one of the Dutch deputies, described him as follows in 1711:

...his advanced age does not make him well-suited for vigorous actions. Defense would be more his strength; indeed, throughout the war, he has not shown great evidence of the activity and vigor so necessary for military actions, especially in an offensive. Nevertheless, he is wise, moderate, experienced, and very brave personally.

An assessment which is supported by the Dutch military historian Jan Willem Wijn.

Even though progress in 1710 and 1711 had been difficult, prospects for Allied success in 1712 were still favourable. Only Arras or Cambrai stood in the way of a full Allied breakthrough. However, in 1712 the British withdrew from the coalition, arguing that they were primarily fighting for Dutch and Austrian interests. As a result, the Allies were unable to exploit the French army's vulnerable position. During the early months of 1712, Count Tilly was for some time unable to take command due to an illness. His duties were taken over by Lord Albemarle and the Hereditary Prince of Hesse-Kassel. The rest of the year he commanded the Dutch-Imperial army together with Eugene of Savoy.

== After the Peace of Utrecht ==
Tilly was rewarded the post of governor of Namur in 1713. The next year he was transferred to the same position in 's-Hertogenbosch and in 1718 he was awarded with the governorship of the fortress town of Maastricht.

== Personal life ==
Tilly married Anne Antoinette d'Aspremont-Lynden countess of Reckheim. Anne often stayed with him in the field and had even been captured once at the Battle of Ekeren. In 1723 Tilly died and was buried at the Basilica of Saint Servatius in Maastricht.

== Sources ==
- Nimwegen, Olaf van (2020). De Veertigjarige Oorlog 1672-1712: de strijd van de Nederlanders tegen de Zonnekoning (The 40 Years War 1672-1712: the Dutch struggle against the Sun King) (in Dutch). Prometheus. ISBN 978-90-446-3871-4.
- "Claude-Frédéric T'Serclaes Count Tilly". The Spanish Succession. n.d.
- Frey, Linda S. (1995). The Treaties of the War of the Spanish Succession: An Historical and Critical Dictionary. Greenwood Publishing Group. ISBN 0-313-27884-9.
- Blok, P.J.; Molhuysen, P.C. (1912). "Tilly, Claude 't Serclaes". Nieuw Nederlandsch biografisch woordenboek. Deel 2.
- MacDowall, Simon (2020). Malplaquet 1709: Marlborough's Bloodiest Battle. Osprey. ISBN 978-1-4728-4123-0.
- Van Lennep, Jacob (1880). De geschiedenis van Nederland, aan het Nederlandsche Volk verteld [The history of the Netherlands, told to the Dutch nation] (in Dutch). Leiden; z.j.
- Wijn, J.W. (1956). Het Staatsche Leger: Deel VIII Het tijdperk van de Spaanse Successieoorlog (The Dutch States Army: Part VIII The era of the War of the Spanish Succession) (in Dutch). Martinus Nijhoff.
- De Graaf, Ronald (2021). Friso: het tragische leven van Johan Willem Friso [Friso: the tragic life of John William Friso] (in Dutch). Boom. ISBN 978-90-2443-676-7.
- Wijn, J.W. (1964). Het Staatsche Leger: Deel VIII-3 Het tijdperk van de Spaanse Successieoorlog 1711–1715 (The Dutch States Army: Part VIII-3 The era of the War of the Spanish Succession 1702–1705) (in Dutch). Martinus Nijhoff.
- Fruin, Robert (1867). "De schuld van Willem III en zijn vrienden aan den moord der gebroeders de Witt". De Gids. 31.
- Russel, Joseph (1867). Notice historique sur le feld-maréchal Claude t'Serclaes Comte de Tilly, général en chef des armées de leurs hautes puissances Etats des Provinces Unies Hollandaises (in French). Russel.
- Nimwegen, Olaf van (1995). De subsistentie van het leger: Logistiek en strategie van het Geallieerde en met name het Staatse leger tijdens de Spaanse Successieoorlog in de Nederlanden en het Heilige Roomse Rijk (1701-1712) [The subsistence of the Allied and especially the Dutch army during the War of the Spanish Succession] (Thesis) (in Dutch). Universiteit Utrecht.
- Falkner, James (2014). Marlborough's War Machine, 1702–1711. Pen & Sword Military. ISBN 9781473842953.
