= Sicco van Goslinga =

Dutch States Army officer and politician

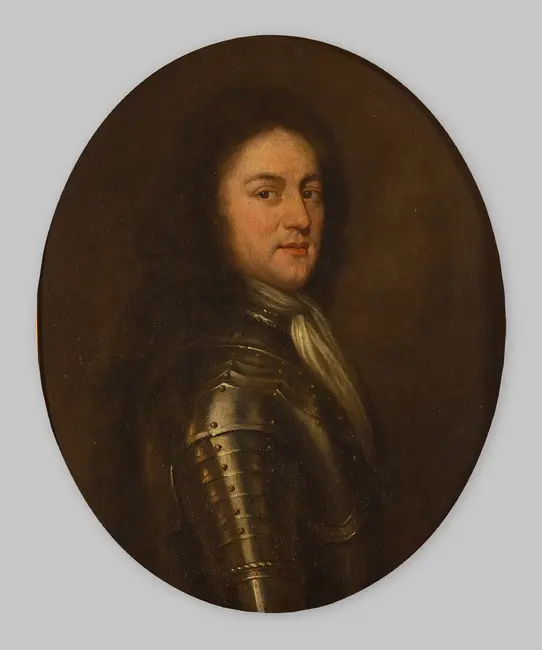
- Sicco van Goslinga, by Lancelot Volders
- Born: 1664
- Died: 1731 (aged 66–67)
- Spouses: Jeanette Isabelle baroness of Schwartzenberg and Hohenlansberg, vrijvrouwe of Ameland
- Father: Johan van Goslinga
- Military career
- Allegiance: Dutch Republic
- Conflicts: War of the Spanish Succession; Battle of Ramillies; Battle of Oudenarde; Siege of Lille; Crossing of the Scheldt; Siege of Tournai; Battle of Malplaquet; Siege of Mons; Siege of Bouchain

Sicco van Goslinga (1664 – 12 October 1731) was a nobleman and politician who served as a field deputy of the States-General of the Dutch Republic in the Dutch States Army. From 1706 to 1709 and in 1711 he served alongside John Churchill, 1st Duke of Marlborough during his campaigns in Flanders in the War of the Spanish Succession. His memoirs form an important source of information for historians of the period.

== Biography ==
=== Family life ===
Goslinga married Jeanette (Joanne) Isabelle baroness thoe Schwartzenberg und Hohenlansberg, vrijvrouwe of Ameland, at Ballum, Friesland, on 12 June 1692. They had five daughters, one of whom, Anna Dodonea, would marry Unico Wilhelm van Wassenaer.

=== Career ===
After studies at the University of Franeker and the University of Utrecht he became Grietman of Franekeradeel in 1688, a function he would hold until his death. This made him a regent and put him in line for all kinds of functions on a provincial level in the province of Friesland. He also represented that province in the States-General and in the Raad van State (Council of State) on many occasions (see "List of functions" in the External links).

As a member of the Council of State (which was the most important executive organ of the Republic in the military field, especially after the Second Stadtholderless Period had started) he became a field deputy for Friesland at the headquarters of the Duke of Marlborough from 1706 until Marlborough's dismissal in 1711. As such he was charged with advising Marlborough, and with keeping an eye on him, as agreed when Marlborough was made lieutenant-captain-general of the army of the Republic in 1702. The Dutch deputies-in-the-field had the right to veto Marlborough's tactical decisions if they thought the interests of the Republic demanded it, and this had led to much friction with Marlborough in previous years. Goslinga, however, proved cooperative generally and managed to provide a positive contribution during the battles of Ramillies, Oudenaarde, and Malplaquet.

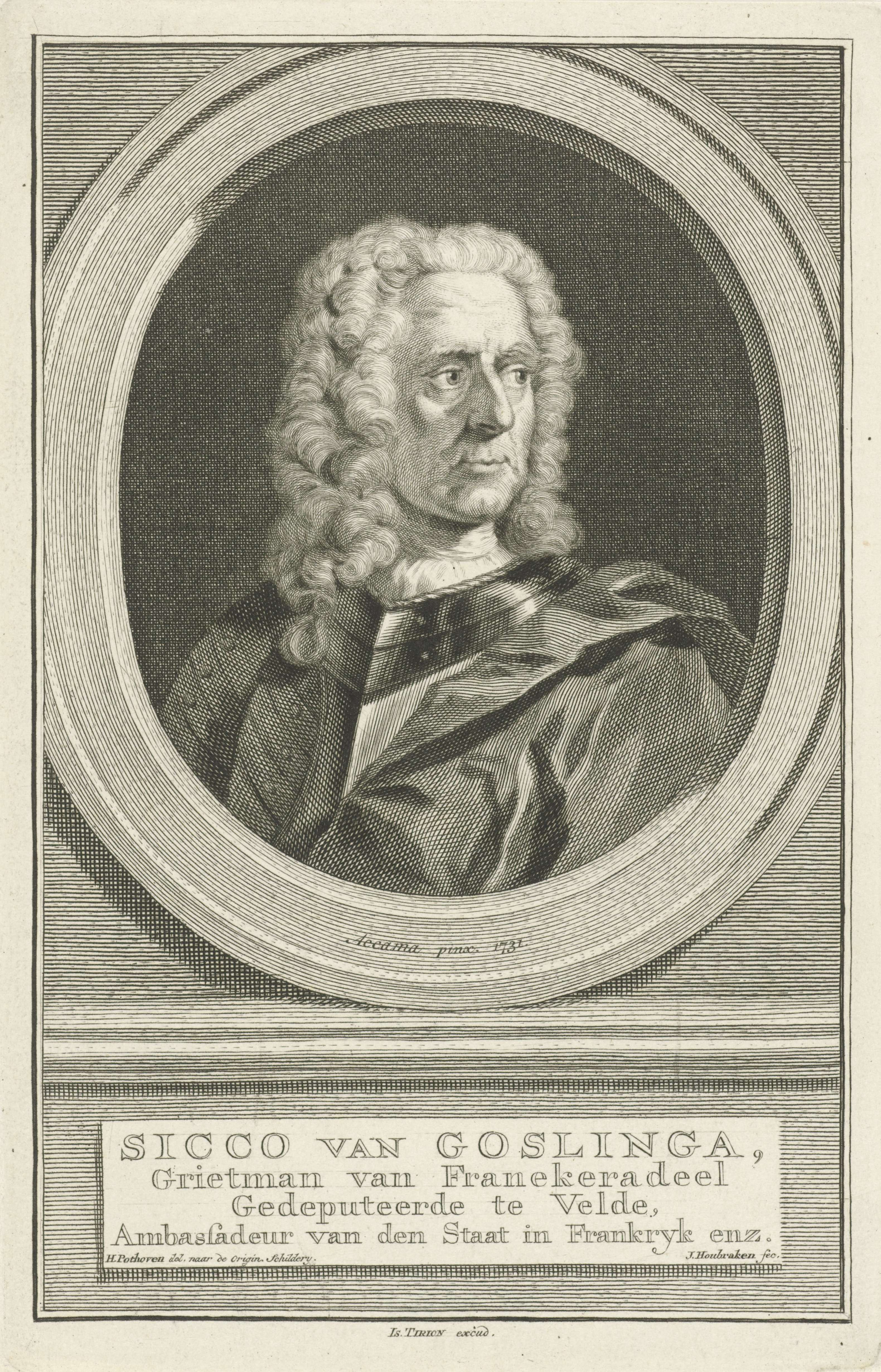
Sicco van Goslinga

Though not a general, he was authorized to give orders to Dutch commanders at these battles. At the Battle of Oudenaarde he took it upon himself to throw a Dutch division into battle at a decisive moment. At Malplaquet he was involved in combat from start to finish and, along with the Prince of Orange, personally led the attacks on the French entrenchments. His horse was shot out from under him during one of these attacks. He also personally ordered up reinforcements when the second Dutch assault on the left flank faltered. Struck hard by the slaughter among the Dutch infantry at Malplaquet, he wrote to Anthonie Heinsius, Grand Pensionary of Holland, that:

"Yesterday, the princes and generals saw the left flank on the battlefield. They saw with horror how our men lay against the field fortifications and entrenchments, still in the ranks as they had fallen. Our infantry is dilapidated and ruined [...] The Count of Tilly will draw up a list [of the dead and wounded] in accordance with the advice of the generals and colonels. [...] It does not suit us to jeopardize our Republic so many times [...], but the good Lord has preserved it, at the cost of a river of blood shed by the bravest people in the world.".

Despite the victory, the limited strategic benefits would mean that Goslinga would still be criticised up to Slingenlandt's time as Grand Pensionary of Holland for giving Marlborough permission for the battle.

Unlike Willem Jan Knoop, Winston Churchill had a low opinion of Goslinga's military abilities, but nevertheless extensively used his memoirs as a source. To illustrate the good rapport between Marlborough and Goslinga, Churchill mentions the anecdote in which they shared Marlborough's cloak to sleep on after the battle of Ramillies. Although Sicco van Goslinga was generally positive about Marlborough and considered him a genius, he was also critical. In van Goslinga's opinion, Marlborough was good at pretending to be sincere and was excessively ambitious and greedy. Although brave, according to van Goslinga, Marlborough also lacked a strong character. He wrote:

"He was sometimes indecisive, especially on the eve of some great undertaking, shrank from difficulties, and sometimes allowed himself to be beaten down by adversity. Maybe that's because he doesn't handle fatigue very well. He knows little about military discipline and gives too much freedom to the soldiers, causing them to commit horrible excesses."

Goslinga served as plenipotentiary for the Republic at the peace negotiations, leading up to the Treaty of Utrecht (1713). After the conclusion of the peace he served as extraordinary envoy of the Republic to the court of Louis XIV of France in 1714 and 1715. In 1728 he represented the Republic at the congress of Soissons about outstanding European diplomatic issues (like the status of Gibraltar).

Until his death he was involved in Dutch politics. He supported the appointment of William IV, Prince of Orange as stadtholder of Groningen in 1719.

== Works ==
- Goslinga, S. van (1857) Mémoires relatifs à la Guerre de succession de 1706-1709 et 1711, de Sicco van Goslinga, publiés par mm. U. A. Evertsz et G. H. M. Delprat, au nom de la Société d’histoire, d’archéologie et de linquistique de Frise, (Published by G.T.N. Suringar, 1857)
- Goslinga, S. van, Slingelandt, S. van, Rappard, W.A. van (ed.) (1978) Briefwisseling Tussen Simon Van Slingelandt En Sicco Van Goslinga 1697-1731, ISBN 90-247-2167-9 ISBN 9789024721672

== Sources ==
- Churchill, W.S. (2002) Marlborough: His Life and Times, University of Chicago Press, ISBN 0-226-10635-7, ISBN 978-0-226-10635-9
- Frey, L. and M. (1995) The Treaties of the War of the Spanish Succession: An Historical and Critical Dictionary, Greenwood Publishing Group, ISBN 0-313-27884-9, ISBN 978-0-313-27884-6, p. 189
- (in Dutch) Vries, O. (1999) De Heeren Van Den Raede: biografieën en groepsportret van de raadsheren van het Hof van Friesland (1499-1811), Uitgeverij Verloren, ISBN 90-6550-076-6, ISBN 978-90-6550-076-2, p. 347
- De Graaf, Ronald (2021). Friso: het tragische leven van Johan Willem Friso [Friso: the tragic life of John William Friso] (in Dutch). Boom. ISBN 978-90-2443-676-7.
- Wijn, J.W. (1959). Het Staatsche Leger: Deel VIII-2 Het tijdperk van de Spaanse Successieoorlog (The Dutch States Army: Part VIII-2 The era of the War of the Spanish Succession) (in Dutch). Martinus Nijhoff.
