= Field deputy (Dutch Republic) =

Dutch army representatives

The field deputies (Dutch: gedeputeerden te velde) were the representatives of the various Dutch sovereign provinces in the armies of the Dutch Republic. They represented, usually in numbers of five or nine, the highest authority in the country within the Dutch States Army, and ensured that the orders of the Dutch States General were respected and above all that the privileges of the provinces and cities were respected, to which they were generally very zealous. The deputies were also charged with maintaining discipline of war, curbing all excesses and enforcing the military laws, conducting or ordering inspections of the troops, as well as ensuring the provisioning and supply of the troops. In rare cases, they also directly commanded troops in battle.

== Origins ==
The States General was the sovereign body in the Dutch Republic. Its members were formally the seven provinces that constituted the Republic. The States of these provinces sent deputations of varying size and composition to represent them in the States General. In practice the work of the States General was done in permanent or ad hoc commissions in which these provincial deputies could be appointed. One type of commission was the so-called "deputation." These generally represented the States General externally, inside or outside the republic. One type of deputation in military affairs was the "deputation in the field" that represented the States General to the Captain General (Note: This was usually the stadtholder of Holland, but when that office was vacant, as during the War of the Spanish Succession it sometimes was a different officer, as e.g. the Duke of Marlborough during that war.) when he was with the mobile army in the field, usually while on campaign. (Note: Similar deputations were also sent to the fleet of the republic while on maoeuvres in wartime, as in the case of Cornelis de Witt, who represented the States General to admiral Michiel de Ruyter during his Raid on the Medway) The field deputies generally received a commission in which their task and competence was defined on an ad hoc basis. The member or members of a deputation-in-the-field were generally members of the States General, but could also be selected from the Council of State, which body was formally in charge of military affairs in the republic. Such deputations could also be sent to subordinate commanders and fortresses with a similar purpose.

The Field Deputies had their origins in the Eighty Years' War and had accompanied Maurice of Nassau and Frederick Henry on most of their campaigns. The two Stadtholders had been obliged to formulate their plans for military campaigns in consultation a committee of the States-General known as the 'secrete besogne'. This committee had to look out for the interests of the Dutch Republic. In times when the relationship between Stadholder and States General was good cooperation worked fine, but in times of political conflict friction could arise between the deputies and the Stadtholder.

In 1672, at the beginning of the Franco-Dutch War, Johan de Witt, under pressure from the Orangists, had given William III of Orange command of the Dutch States Army. However, the not yet 22-year-old Captain-General of the Union was forced to act with some deputies in the field behind him. The States General was the highest military authority and without the approval of the deputies placed with him as their proxies, William could not take any decision. The same year, however, William's political power grew enough for him to be able to send them home again. He wanted to act autonomously as commander and only tolerated their presence again when their duties were limited to financial and logistical matters.

== War of the Spanish Succession ==
At the beginning of the War of Spanish Succession, the situation changed. William III had by now died and although the Dutch Republic had many experienced generals, none of them were considered qualified enough for supreme command in the Low Countries. The Duke of Marlborough was instead appointed commander-in-chief of the joint Anglo-Dutch army. The trust William III had placed in him and the expectation that the appointment would ensure close cooperation between London and The Hague were the deciding factors. However, Marlborough was considered an unknown quantity among the Dutch. He had never before commanded a large army and comparatively limited military experience. Moreover, he was a foreigner and the States General wanted to prevent English political and military interests from being prioritised over those of the Dutch. The States-General thus put severe limits on his power, which were defined in 12 articles. The most notable articles stated that:

1. (Article 2) Marlborough was only allowed to command the Dutch troops that were part of the combined field army.
2. (Article 3) Marlborough always had to formulate his operational plans in consultation with the highest Dutch general, (Note: Athlone until 1703, Overkirk from 1704 to 1708 and Tilly from 1708.) who was also authorised to ask his subordinates for advice.
3. (Article 4) Marlborough had to take all his decisions in agreement with the Dutch commander and the field deputies.
4. (Article 6) Marlborough was not allowed to give orders to the Dutch troops independently of the Dutch senior officers.

A separate instruction instructed the deputies in general terms to watch over the sovereignty of the Republic. They thus possessed considerably more authority through these instructions and even sat with decisive veto in the army war council.

Their role has often been the subject of historiographical debates. Anglo-American historians have historically blamed Marlborough's inability to deliver more battles on Dutch obstruction. Both Dutch generals and the field deputies have been harshly criticised for their reputed frequent vetoes of Marlborough's plans. The historian C. T. Atkinson described the field deputies as a serious handicap to Marlborough, while George Edmundson wrote that Marlborough's bold and well-laid plans were again and again hindered and thwarted by the timidity and obstinacy of the civilian deputies who were placed by the States-General at his side. Some historians, however, had other views. B. H. Liddell Hart, for example, argued that it were not the deputies but mainly the Dutch generals who were in Marlborough's way. More recently, historians have started to divert from these old narratives. Modern historian Jamel Ostwald instead sympathises with the Dutch perspective and validates their concerns, writing:

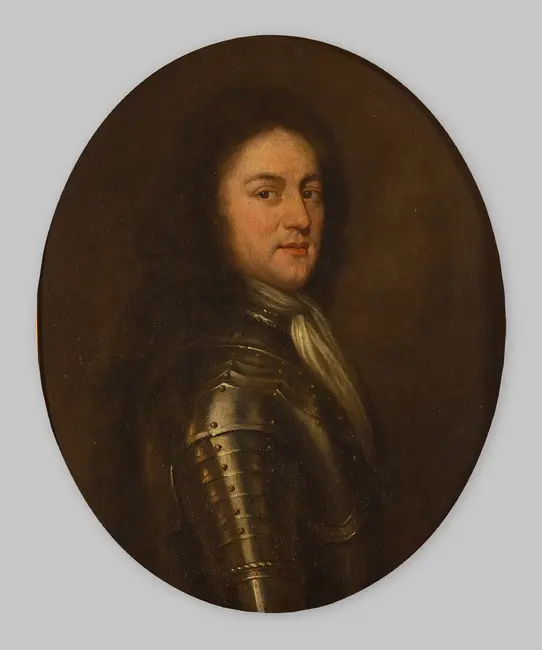
Portrait of Sicco van Goslinga, one of the more notable field deputies.

We should also note the Anglocentric dismissal of valid Dutch concerns. The Dutch have been criticized for avoiding battle, but they had reason to be cautious. After several previous close calls (e.g., Nijmegen 1702), they knew that losing a battle close to their homeland was dangerous without the protection of their barrier fortresses. Their predicament, generally acknowledged if only parenthetically, was exacerbated by the fact that Marlborough's skill as a general was at the start unknown, since he had never before commanded a large army. Nor did the Flanders engagements of the Nine Years' War support Marlborough's contention that battles could be decisive. How surprising is it then that the Dutch were not willing to let an Englishman risk Dutch troops in a battle that might lead to the occupation of Dutch territory? Instead the Dutch used sieges to regain their barrier, a goal which hardly demanded a risky battle.

Dutch historian Olaf van Nimwegen dismisses the common notion that the Dutch Deputies and Marlborough had a difficult relationship. He writes: English historians tend to portray Marlborough as a military genius whose plans were constantly frustrated by the overcautious or jealous Dutch. This is not correct. With the exception of the autumn of 1703 and the second half of 1705 Marlborough and the Dutch generals and Field Deputies cooperated very successfully with each other. He, Ostwald and Darryl Dee also highlight the important role they played in the logistics of the Allied army and in various other ways. Darryl Dee writes: Far from being ignorant of war, most were long-serving members of the Council of State who possessed expertise and experience that rivaled those of the professional soldiers. In particular, their knowledge of finances and supplies often made them better placed to realistically reconcile the Allies’ strategic and operational ends with their material means.

Deputy Adolf Hendrik van Rechteren, for example, played an important role during the march leading up to the Battle of Blenheim. He made sure that on the 450-kilometer-long march, the Allies would nowhere be denied passage by local rulers, nor would they need to look for provisions, horsefeed or new boots. He also saw to it that sufficient stopovers were arranged along the way to ensure that the Allies arrived at their destination in good condition. Although the field deputies were often not military men, some, like Jacob Hop and Sicco van Goslinga, played an important role during battle. Hop did so at the Battle of Ekeren, while Van Goslinga directly commanded troops at the battles of Oudenarde and Malplaquet.

== Sources ==
- Thomassen, T. H. P. M. (2009). Instrumenten van de macht. De Staten-Generaal en hun archieven 1576-1796 (PDF) (in Dutch). Amsterdam.
- "Staten-Generaal: aanstellingen (Commissieboeken), 1586-1794; Gedeputeerde te velde". Nationaal Archief (in Dutch).
- Gouwens, F. (2015). "'Tot de secrete saecke vande Zee'. Geheimhouding en besluitvorming tijdens de Tweede Engelse Oorlog (1665-1667)". Leidschrift: Historisch Tijdschrift (in Dutch). 30 (3): 113–129.
- "gedeputeerde te velde". Oosthoek Encyclopedie (in Dutch).
- Landolt, H.M.F. (1861–1862). Militair woordenboek [Military dictionary] (in Dutch).
- Blok, P.J. (1925). Geschiedenis van het Nederlandsche volk. Deel 3 [History of the Dutch people. Volume 3] (in Dutch).
- Van Nimwegen, Olaf (2010). The Dutch Army and the Military Revolutions, 1588–1688. Boydell Press. ISBN 978-1843835752.
- Wijn, J.W. (1956). Het Staatsche Leger: Deel VIII Het tijdperk van de Spaanse Successieoorlog (The Dutch States Army: Part VIII The era of the War of the Spanish Succession) (in Dutch). Martinus Nijhoff.
- Ostwald, Jamel (2000). ""The 'Decisive' Battle of Ramillies, 1706: Prerequisites for Decisiveness in Early Modern Warfare."". The Journal of Military History. 42 (3): 649–677. doi:10.2307/120864. JSTOR 44224692.
- Nimwegen, Olaf van (1995). De subsistentie van het leger: Logistiek en strategie van het Geallieerde en met name het Staatse leger tijdens de Spaanse Successieoorlog in de Nederlanden en het Heilige Roomse Rijk (1701-1712) [The subsistence of the Allied and especially the Dutch army during the War of the Spanish Succession] (Thesis) (in Dutch). Universiteit Utrecht.
- Van Nimwegen, Olaf (2020). De Veertigjarige Oorlog 1672–1712: de strijd van de Nederlanders tegen de Zonnekoning [The 40 Years' War 1672–1712: the Dutch struggle against the Sun King] (in Dutch). Prometheus. ISBN 978-90-446-3871-4.
- Liddell-Hart, B. H.; Atkinson, C. T. (1935). "328. Marlborough and the Dutch Deputies". Journal of the Society for Army Historical Research. 14 (54): 118–119. JSTOR 44232330.
- Edmundson, George (1922). History of Holland. Cambridge University Press.
- De Graaf, Ronald (2021). Friso: het tragische leven van Johan Willem Friso [Friso: the tragic life of John William Friso] (in Dutch). Boom. ISBN 978-90-2443-676-7.
- Van Wessem, Constant (1939). Koning-Stadhouder Willem III [Stadtholder-King William III] (in Dutch).
- Dee, Darryl (2024). 1709: The Twilight of the Sun King. Rowman & Littlefield. ISBN 978-1-5381-7667-2.
