= Charles, comte de la Mothe Houdancourt =

French Lieutenant-General (1643–1728)

Charles, comte de la Mothe Houdancourt (1643 – 24 March 1728) was a French Lieutenant-General.

== Biography ==
He was the son of Antoine I de La Mothe-Houdancourt and a nephew of Marshal Philippe de La Mothe-Houdancourt.
The very influential Duchess of La Ferté-Senneterre and Duchess of Ventadour were his cousins.

At the start of the War of the Spanish Succession, he was a maréchal de camp, but was promoted to lieutenant-général in 1702. He was responsible for the French troops between the coast of Flanders and the Scheldt river. After the French defeat in the Battle of Ramillies in 1706, the whole of Flanders was overrun by the allies, except Ostend which was defended by troops under La Mothe. After a three week siege, la Mothe was forced to capitulate and to withdraw his troops to Dunkirk, Ypres and Mons.

From Ypres, he was able to retake Plassendale and Bruges in July 1708. After the great Allied victory in the Battle of Oudenaarde, Lille was besieged in August 1708. La Mothe was ordered to intercept a large allied supply convoy between Ostend and Lille, but he failed miserably in the Battle of Wijnendale, despite a numerical superiority of 3 to 1.

Lille fell on 10 December 1708, and the Duke of Marlborough decided to attack Ghent before withdrawing to winter quarters. His army arrived in Ghent on 18 December, and La Mothe was ordered to defend the town to the last man. But without a French relieving force en route, La Mothe surrendered the city on 30 December.

La Mothe was discharged and asked not to present himself at Versailles, but to reside in his Château du Fayel near Compiègne.

Saint-Simon described La Mothe as :
a selfless man, full of valor, honor and ambition, but also the most obstinate, and perhaps most incapable man among the lieutenant-generals.

=== Marriage and children ===
He married on 14 March 1687 with Élisabeth de La Vergne, widow of Jean-Paul de Gourdon de Genouillac, comte de Vaillac. They had one son :

- Louis Claude de La Mothe-Houdancourt (1687–1755), Marshal of France in 1747

== Sources ==
- Dictionnaire généalogique, héraldique, chronologique et historique par François Alexandre Aubert de la Chenaye Desbois - page 593
- geneanet
