= Philippe de La Mothe-Houdancourt =

17th-century French commander

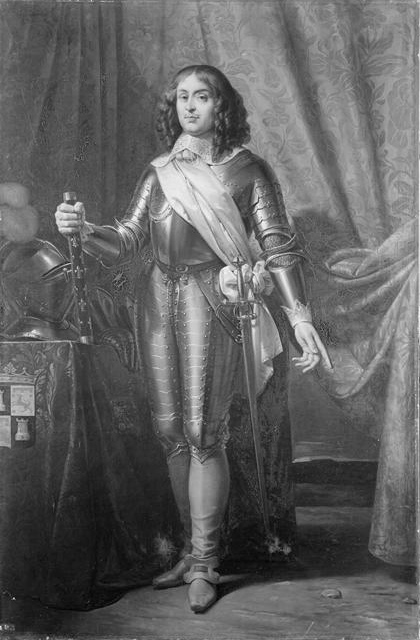
- Philippe de la Mothe-Houdancourt, as a young man; painted after his death

French Viceroy of Catalonia
- In office July 1642 – November 1644

Personal details
- Born: 1605
- Died: 24 March 1657 (aged 51–52) Le Fayel, Kingdom of France

Military service
- Rank: Marshal of France
- Battles/wars: Huguenot rebellions; La Rochelle; Saint-Martin-de-Ré; War of the Mantuan Succession; Castelnaudary; Franco-Spanish War (1635-1659); Les Avins; Leuven; Turin; Catalan Revolt; Montmeló; Lleida (1642); Lleida (1644); Barcelona (1651)

Philippe, Comte de la Mothe-Houdancourt (1605 – 24 March 1657) was a Marshal of France, who served as Viceroy of Catalonia when it was occupied by France during the Franco-Spanish War.

In November 1644, he was accused of treason, and imprisoned for four years. On his release, he joined the 1648 uprising against the Crown known as the Fronde, but switched sides in 1651, and was re-appointed Viceroy of Catalonia. After failing to prevent the loss of Barcelona in 1652, he retired from active service, and died in 1657.

== Biography ==
Philippe de la Mothe-Houdancourt was named after his father, also Philippe de La Mothe-Houdancourt (1558–1654). The eldest of eleven children from the latter's third marriage to Louise Charles du Plessis-Picquet (ca 1575–1620), his siblings included Daniel (1595–1628), and Henri (1612–1684), along with a half-brother, Antoine (ca 1592–1672), from his father's first marriage.

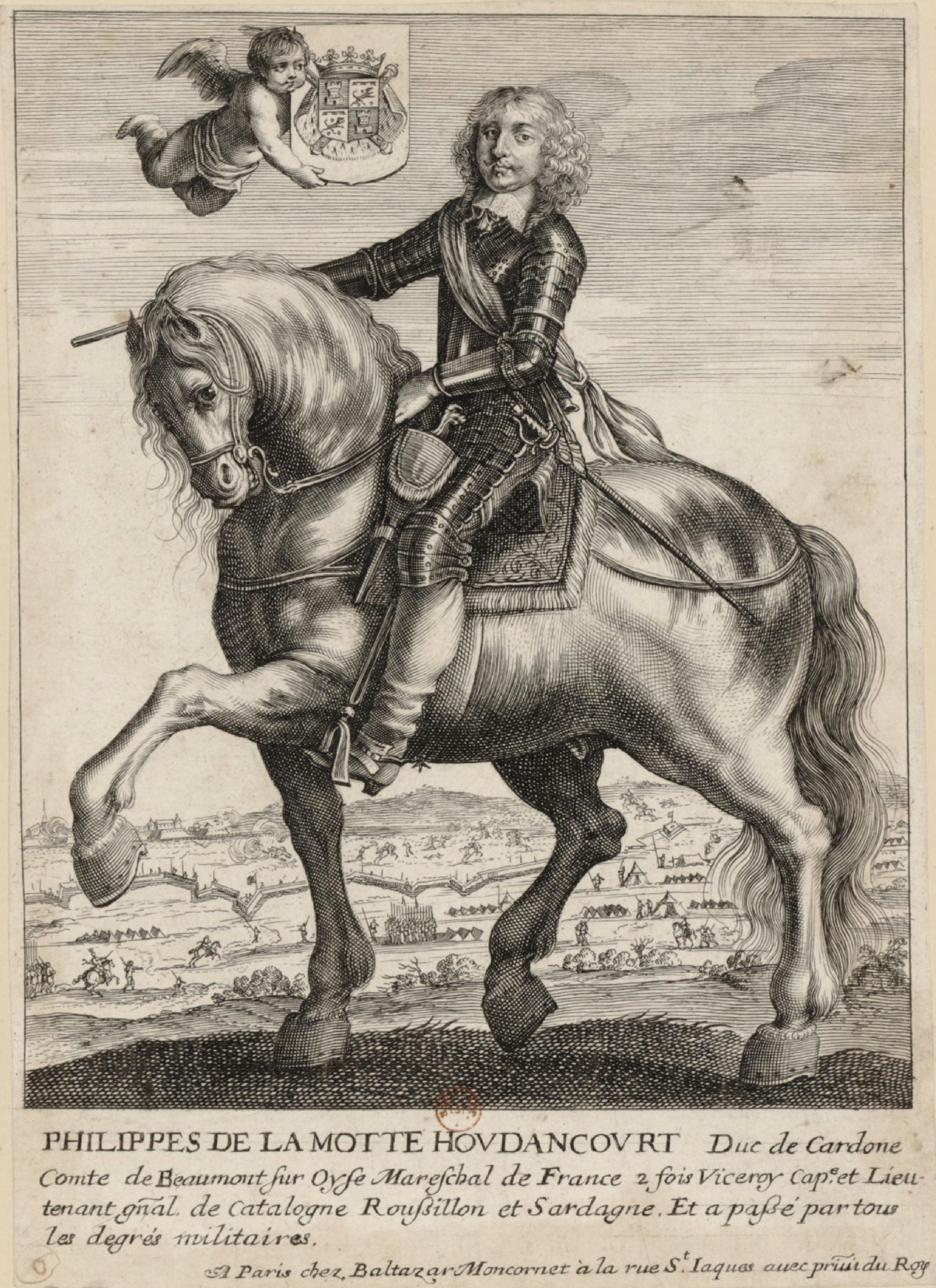
Marshal Philippe de La Motte

In 1650, he married Louise de Prie (1624–1709), with whom he had 3 daughters, Françoise Angélique (1650–1711), Charlotte (1651–1744), and Marie Gabrielle Angélique, (1654–1726).

Charlotte married the Duke of Ventadour, and was governess to Louis XV, who was five years old when he succeeded his great-grandfather Louis XIV in 1715. She reputedly saved his life by preventing the doctors from bleeding him, a procedure that had already killed his elder brother.

== Career ==
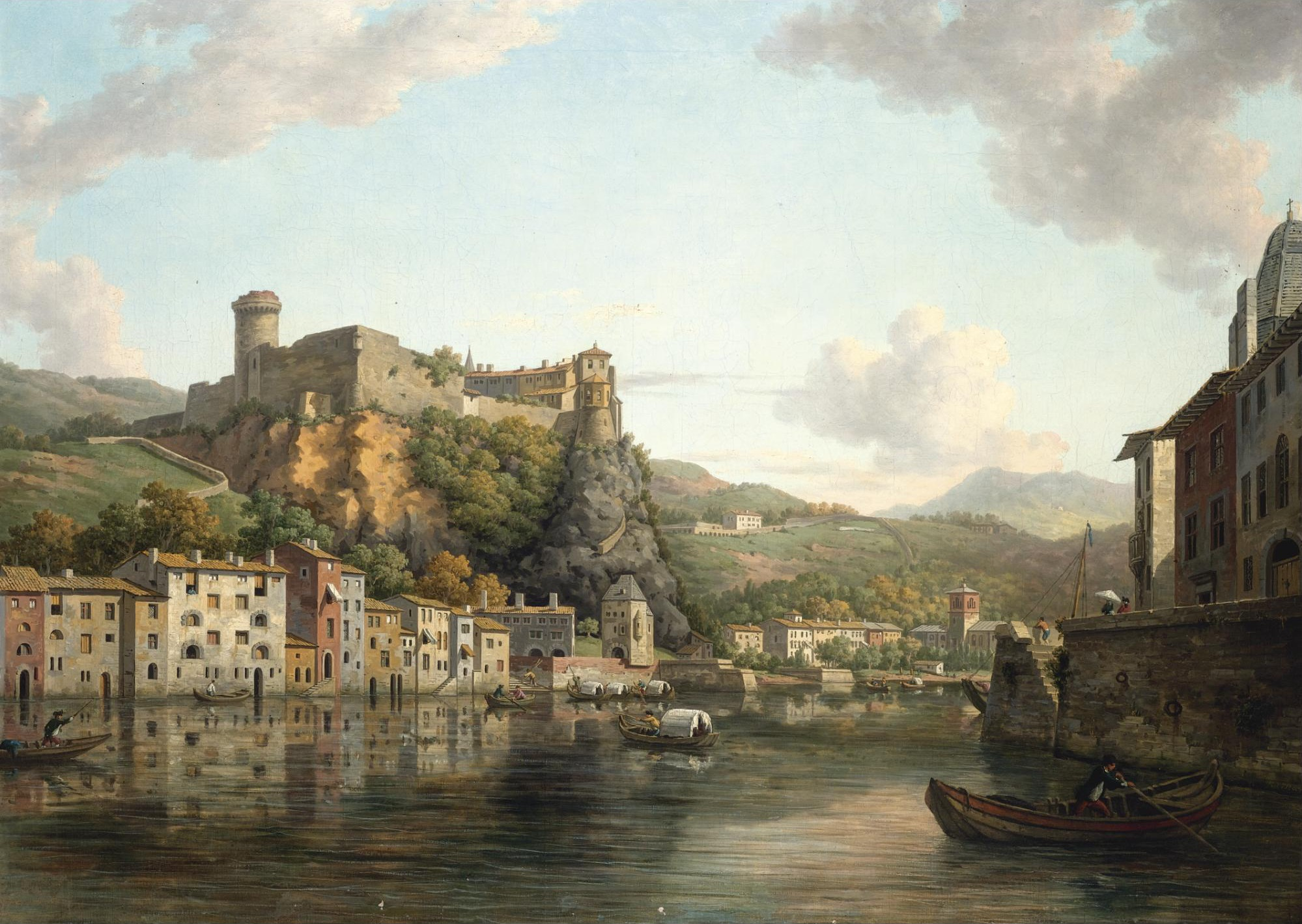
The fortress of Pierre Size, where La Mothe-Houdancourt was held from 1644 to 1648

His military career began at the age of 17 during the 1622 to 1630 Huguenot rebellions, when he took part in the 1629 sieges of La Rochelle and Saint-Martin-de-Ré. He later fought in the 1628 to 1631 War of the Mantuan Succession, and was part of the Royalist force that suppressed the rebellion of Henri II de Montmorency at the Battle of Castelnaudary in 1632. In the same year, he was made governor of Bellegarde.

He commanded his own regiment when the Franco-Spanish War began in May 1635, fighting at Les Avins, and Leuven. In 1636, he was garrison commander at Saint-Jean-de-Losne, when it was besieged by Imperial forces under Matthias Gallas, holding out long enough to be relieved. Promoted lieutenant general in 1640, he served in Piedmont with Comte d'Harcourt, helping capture Casale Monferrato and Turin in 1640.

La Mothe-Houdancourt's career benefitted from being connected through his mother to Cardinal Richelieu, French Chief Minister from 1624, as well as support from the Secretary of War, François de Noyers. In January 1642, he assumed command of French forces supporting the Catalan Revolt, winning key battles at Montmeló and Lleida. In recognition, he was appointed Viceroy of Catalonia, Marshal of France, and made Duke of Cardona, although the title was already held by Fernández de Córdoba, and he rarely used it. However, the death of Richelieu in December 1642 led to de Noyers losing office, depriving La Mothe-Houdancourt of his most important sponsors.

Louis XIII died on 14 May 1643; his five-year-old son, Louis XIV, became king, and a Regency Council ruled in his name. Headed by his mother Anne of Austria, supported by Cardinal Mazarin, it led to a power struggle with Condé, the leading French general, a member of the royal family, and effective ruler of large parts of eastern France.

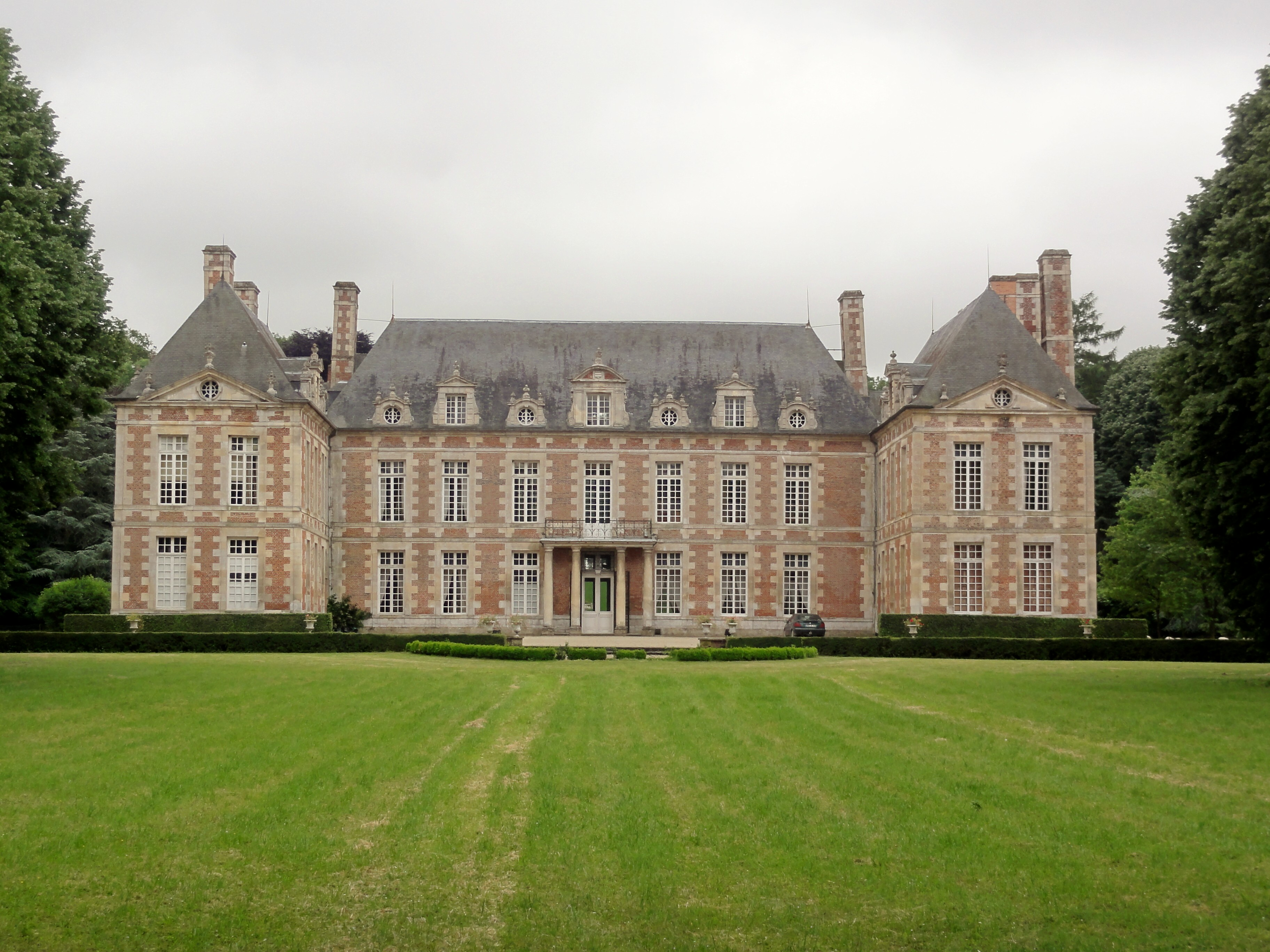
Château du Fayel; built for de la Mothe-Houdancourt between 1650 and 1655

By 1644, Spain was regaining ground in Catalonia; after La Mothe-Houdancourt surrendered Lleida in July, he was accused of participation in a 1643 conspiracy known as the 'cabale des Importants'. Led by the duc de Beaufort, it was the latest in a series of similar plots, driven by the feudal lords who lost power and influence since 1624. Central to their demands was peace with Spain, as they argued the war had been deliberately prolonged to ensure first Richelieu, then Mazarin, retained control.

The conspiracy collapsed when Beaufort was arrested in September 1643, but his connections to La Mothe-Houdancourt made the defeats in Catalonia appear suspicious. He was ordered back to France in November 1644; on reaching Lyon, he was arrested, charged with treason, and held for four years in the Pierre-Size fortress.

After being released in 1648, La Mothe-Houdancourt initially supported the Fronde; he submitted to Royal authority in 1650, and was reinstated in 1651 as Viceroy of Catalonia, replacing Louis II de Bourbon-Vendôme. Forced to surrender Barcelona in October 1652, he retired to his family estates at Le Fayel, where he supervised the construction of Château du Fayel. Completed shortly before his death in 1657, the building is largely unchanged, and remains in private ownership.

== Sources ==
- André, Louis (1937). "Le Maréchal de La Mothe-Houdancourt (son procès, sa rébellion, sa fin)". Revue d'Histoire Moderne & Contemporaine. 12 (26).
- Bluche, Francois (1891). Greengrass, Mark (ed.). Louis VV (1990 ed.). Franklin Greenwood.
- Elliott, JH (1984). Richelieu and Olivares (Cambridge Studies in Early Modern History). Cambridge University Press. ISBN 978-0521262057.
- Jacques, Tony (2007). Dictionary of Battles and Sieges: P-Z. Greenwood. ISBN 978-0313335396.
- Lacour, Louis (1859). "La Mothe-Houdancourt, Philippe, comte de". In Hoefer, Ferdinand (ed.). Nouvelle biographie générale. Vol. 29. Greenwood.
- Monter, William (1999). Cultural Exchange in Early Modern Europe 1400–1700 (Volume 2). Cambridge University Press. ISBN 978-0521845472.
