= Château du Fayel =

Château in Hauts-de-France, France

Coordinates: 49.3699°N 2.6969°E

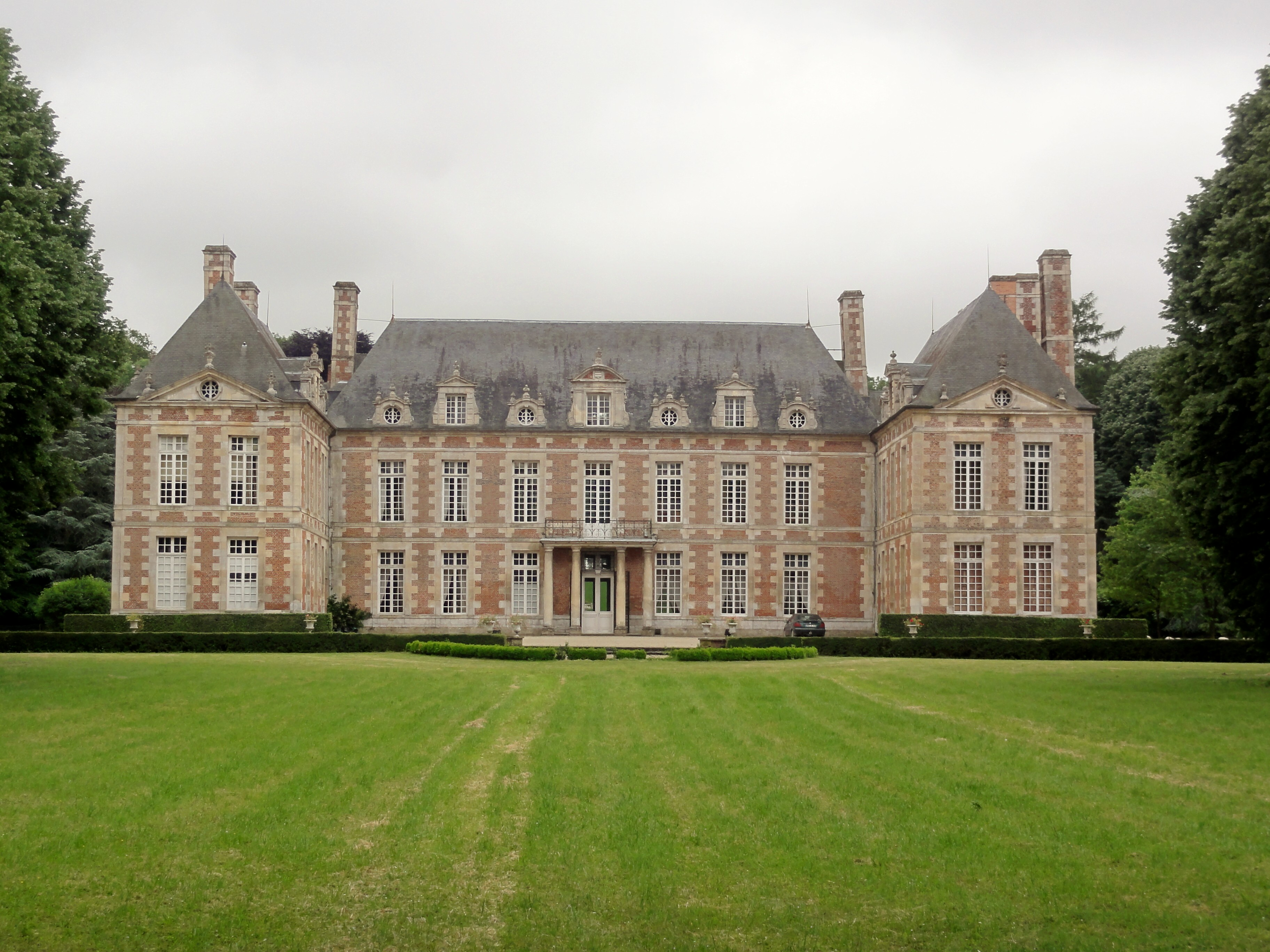
- Façade

- Location within France

General information
- Location: France/Picardie

The Château du Fayel is located near Le Fayel, in the French Oise department.

Built between 1650 and 1655 for Philippe de La Mothe-Houdancourt, Marshall of France and Viceroy of Catalonia, it was designed by Jacques Sparrow, an elder half-brother of Libéral Bruant, designer of Les Invalides.

The Château was inhabited by members of the de la Mothe Houdancourt family, like Charles (between 1693 and 1728) and Louis Claude (between 1728 and 1755), until it passed by marriage to the Rouault-Gamaches, Héricy, and Cossé-Brissac families. The Château was never sold and is today still inhabited by Édouard de Cossé-Brissac.

The interior was renovated in the 18th century, and the park no longer exists, but the exterior remains largely unchanged. It was first registered as an historic monument on 13 January 1947.
