= Battle of Wijnendale =

Battle in the war of the Spanish succession in 1708

Coordinates: 51.0922°N 3.0661°E

- Part of the War of the Spanish Succession
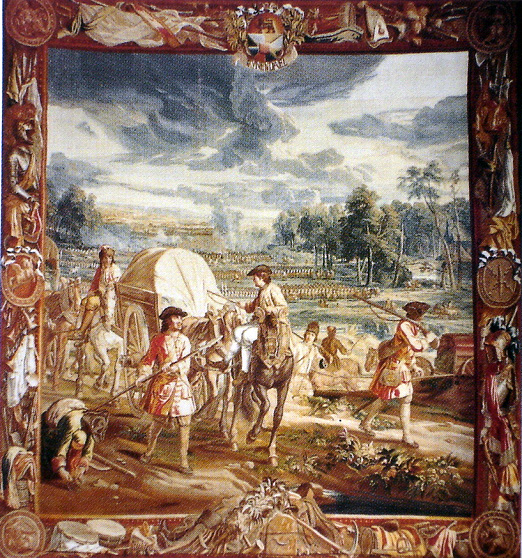
- Tapestry representing the battle of Wijnendale (1708) in Blenheim Palace, residence of the Duke of Marlborough, showing in the foreground the allied convoy, on the right Wijnendale Castle.
Date	28 September 1708
Location	near Wijnendale, present-day Belgium
Result	Anglo-Dutch victory

Belligerents
Dutch Republic; Great Britain	France; Bourbon Spain

Commanders and leaders
(Kingdom of Great Britain) John Richmond Webb (Dutch Republic) Cornelis van Nassau-Woudenberg	(Kingdom of France) Count de la Mothe

Strength
7,500 men	22,000

Casualties and losses
1,000	2,000

The Battle of Wijnendale took place during the War of the Spanish Succession fought on 28 September 1708 near Wijnendale, Flanders, between an allied force protecting a convoy carrying ammunition for the Siege of Lille (1708) and forces of Bourbon France and Spain. It ended in a victory for the allies, leading to the taking of Lille.

== Prelude ==
After their great victory in the Battle of Oudenaarde (11 July 1708), Marlborough and Prince Eugene of Savoy decided to besiege Lille. But Lille was very well defended by modern fortifications designed by Vauban and a garrison of 16,000 men. The allied siege didn't go as well as planned and a lack of ammunition was imminent. To make things worse, the supply lines from the east were cut by the French, so the only remaining line of supply was by ship from England to the port of Ostend, some 75 km (47 mi) from Lille.
Marlborough ordered the necessary goods to be shipped to Ostend and a large convoy of 700 slow wagons was organised there to travel further over land to Lille. The convoy was protected by 6,000 infantry and 1,500 cavalry under command of Major General John Richmond Webb and Brigadier Cornelis van Nassau-Woudenberg, the son of Lord Overkirk.

The commander of the French garrison of Bruges, Count de la Mothe, was informed of the convoy and gathered a force of 22,000 to 24,000 men towards Wijnendale to intercept the convoy.

== Battle ==
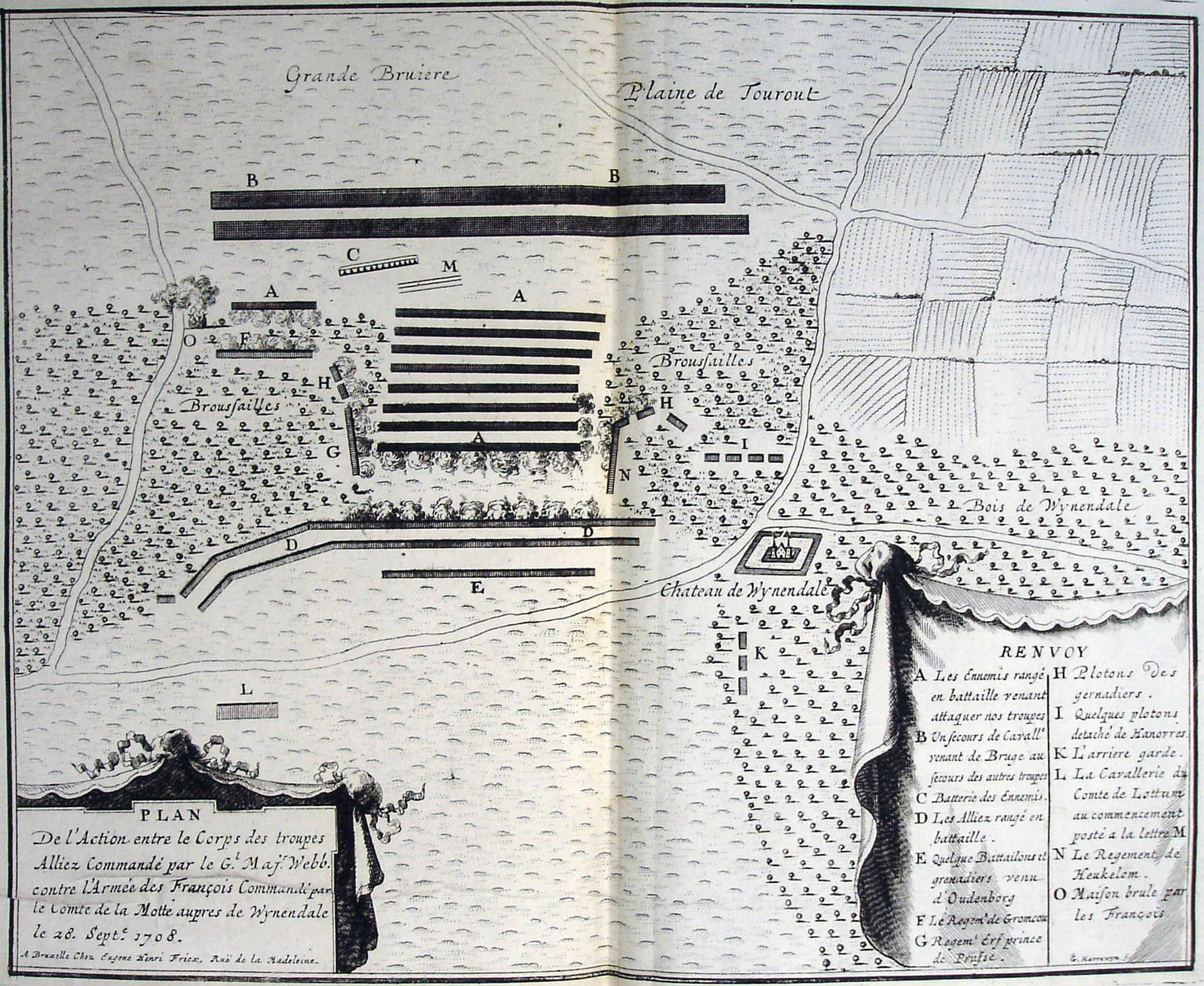
Battleplan of the Battle of Wijnendale (1708) printed by Eugène Henri Fricx in Brussels

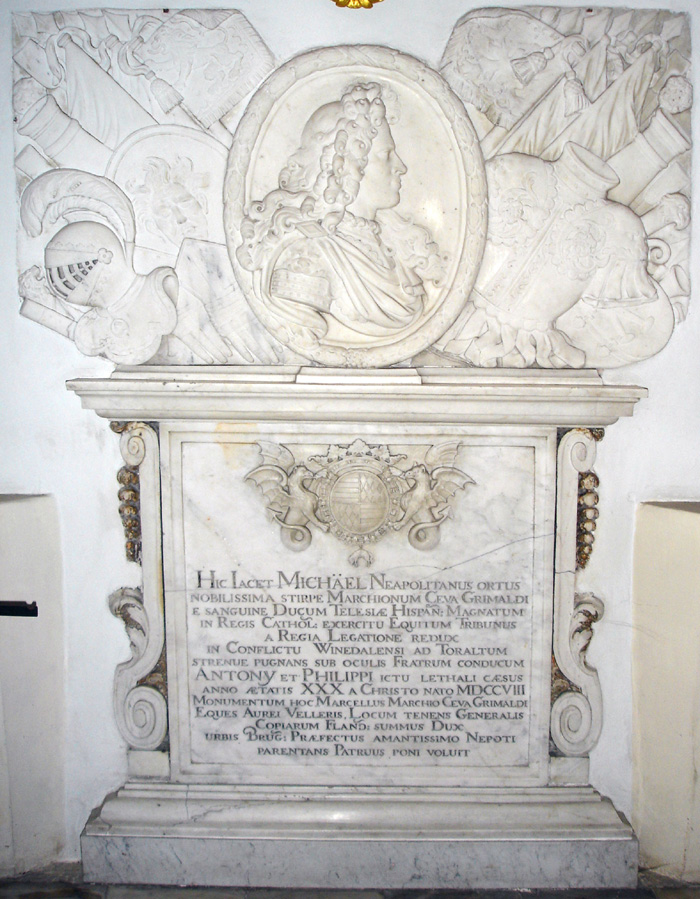
Tomb in the Sint-Walburga Church in Bruges of Michael Ceva Grimaldi, a Spanish Army officer from Naples, who was killed in the battle, aged 30

Webb was aware of the advancing French army and knew a confrontation was unavoidable. He drew up a plan to compensate for his numerical disadvantage. Using the wooded landscape around Wijnendale, he chose an open spot, flanked on both sides by woods and hedges. He placed his troops in two long lines, closing off this open space. Later a third line was formed with reinforcements coming from Oudenburg. Meanwhile, behind these lines, the convoy continued slowly towards Lille.

While Webb was deploying his troops, Prussian general Carl von Lottum, with only 150 cavalry, harassed the approaching French army, gaining valuable time, and preventing de la Mothe from gathering knowledge of the terrain and the plans of the allies.

Having arrived at the open space, de la Mothe, expecting an easy victory, deployed his army as expected. Between 4 and 5 pm the French artillery opened fire. When de la Mothe saw the effects on the enemy were limited, he ordered his infantry forward. The large French force was hampered by the narrow terrain and suffered badly from the fire of the allied first line, which held its ground. Then Webb ordered the Prussian, Hanoverian and Dutch regiments who were hidden in the woods on both flanks, to open fire. Despite suffering heavy casualties, de la Mothe ordered a second attack, which initially pushed the allied first line back. But with the help of the second line and the continuous fire from the flanks, the French were stopped and forced to withdraw and leave the battlefield.

When the battle was as good as won, allied cavalry under command of William Cadogan arrived at the battlefield. He had been sent from Lille by Marlborough, who was anxious to secure the arrival of the ammunition convoy.

== Aftermath ==
The toll of this two-hour battle was heavy: some 2,000 French soldiers were killed or wounded. The allies lost 1,000 dead and wounded, mostly from the early artillery bombardment.

The convoy reached Lille intact on 29 September, allowing the siege to continue. Three weeks later, on 22 October, the city was taken.

Although Marlborough, in his reports to London, gave credit for the victory to Maj Gen Webb, the initial report in the Gazette credited the victory to Cadogan, who had arrived on the scene only at the end of the battle. Winston Churchill claims that Marlborough deliberately slighted Webb and favoured Cadogan, a fellow Whig, but this view is challenged By Holmes. According to Holmes, Marlborough wrote to Godolphin, the Lord Treasurer, on 1 October, shortly after the battle: "Webb and Cadogan have on this occasion, as they will always do, behaved themselves extremely well." And he had already congratulated Webb personally, attributing success "chiefly to your good conduct and resolution" and undertaking to "do you justice at home". The Duke included Webb in his nominations for promotion and felt certain that he deserved to be made a lieutenant-general. But Webb continued to believe he had been poorly treated even though he subsequently received full credit and the thanks of Parliament for the action and kind words from Queen Anne, and the following year he was promoted as expected. From this point onwards Webb became the centre of Tory agitation against Marlborough. Holmes quotes an amusing footnote: Webb was so keen to tell everyone how well he had done and how badly he had been treated that even his fellow Tory, the Duke of Argyll, was moved, after Webb was wounded a year later at Malplaquet, to say that it would have been a service to everyone had the wound been to his tongue.

Webb and Nassau-Woudenberg garnered much praise in the Dutch Republic and Sicco van Goslinga, one of the Dutch field deputies, requested promotion to major general for Overkirk's son. In the army of the Bourbons, the French largely blamed the Spanish for the defeat, but the leadership of La Mothe was also strongly criticised.

== Sources ==
- Relation de l'Action qui s'est passée à Wynendale le 28. de Septemb[re] 1708. entre un Corps de Troupes des Alliés, commandé par le Major-General Webb, & l'Armée des François, commandée par le Comte de la Motte, Brussel, Eugène Fricx, 1708.
- Winston S. Churchill, Marlborough: His Life and Times. Book Two, The University of Chicago Press, 2002, Chap. XXVI: Wynendael.
- Richard Holmes, Marlborough: Britain's Greatest General, HarperCollins, London, 2009.
- Wijn, J.W. (1959). Het Staatsche Leger: Deel VIII-2 Het tijdperk van de Spaanse Successieoorlog (The Dutch States Army: Part VIII-2 The era of the War of the Spanish Succession) (in Dutch). Martinus Nijhoff.
