= Battle of Lleida (1642) =

Battle fought on October 7, 1642

Coordinates: 41°37′0″N 0°38′0″E

- Part of the Reapers' War and the Franco-Spanish War (1635–59)
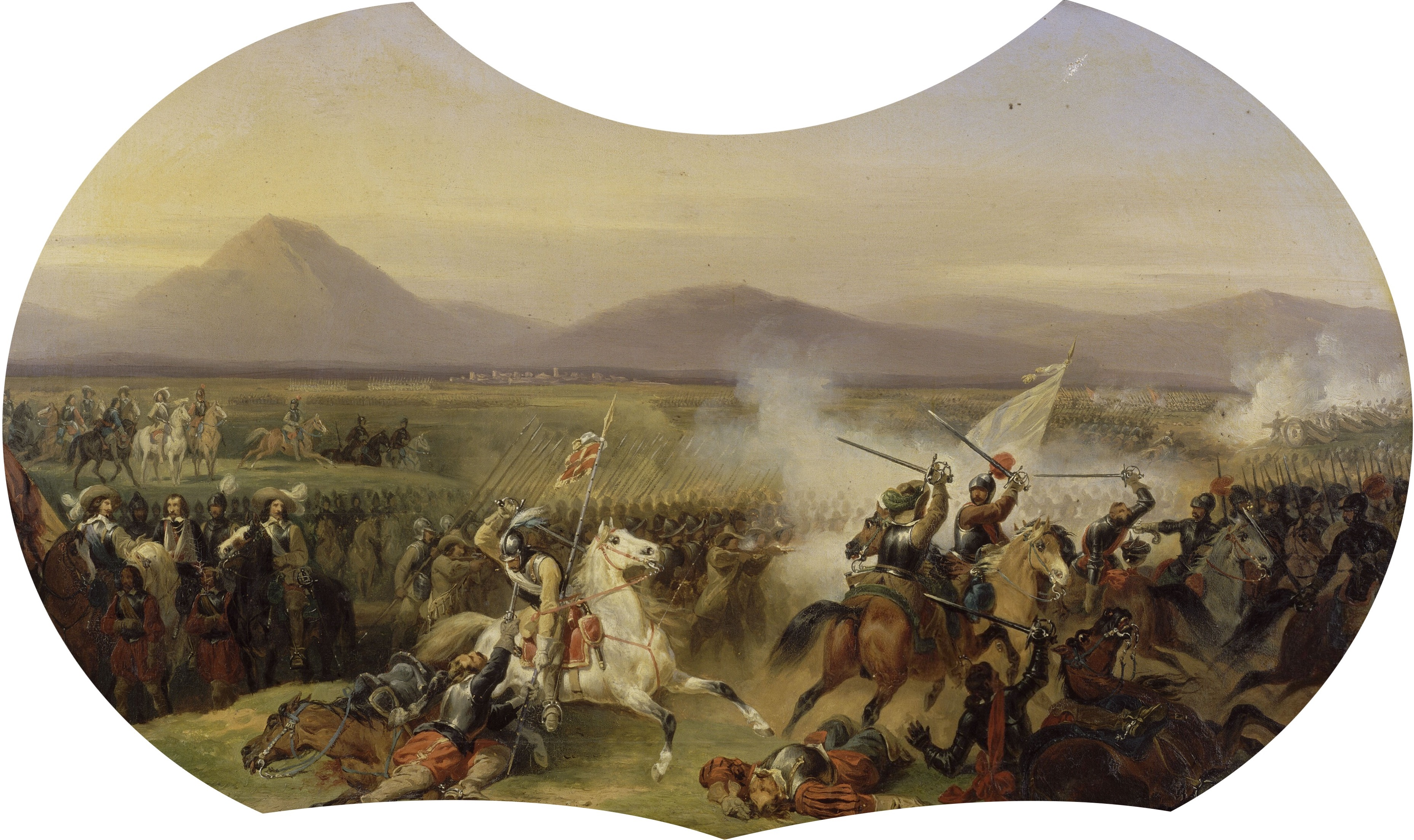
- The battle of Lleida by Hippolyte Lecomte
Date	7 October 1642
Location	Lleida, Principality of Catalonia
Result	Franco-Catalan victory

Belligerents
Kingdom of France; Principality of Catalonia	(Spain) Spanish Empire

Commanders and leaders
(Kingdom of France) Philippe de La Mothe-Houdancourt (Kingdom of France) Comte de Roches-Baritault †	(Spain) Marquis de Leganés

Strength
12,000–13,000	22,000–25,000

Casualties and losses
1,000 killed	2,000 killed

The Battle of Lleida took place on 7 October 1642, during the Catalan Revolt, part of the wider Franco-Spanish War (1635–1659). A combined Franco-Catalan army under Philippe de La Mothe-Houdancourt defeated a larger Spanish force led by Marquis de Leganés, sent to capture the town of Lleida.

== Background ==
In the summer of 1642, an army commanded by Philippe de La Mothe-Houdancourt, French military commander in Catalonia, marched into Aragon. In order to divert him, Leganés assembled troops from Tarragona and Zaragoza to retake the important city of Lleida, then held by a French garrison.

La Mothe positioned his smaller army in the Llano de las Forques and defeated the Spanish army. After the victory, the French Army besieged Tortosa, but was forced to withdraw.

== Sources ==
- Beauchet-Filleau, Henri (1846). Dictionnaire historique et généalogique des familles de l'ancien Poitou (in French). Saurin.
- De Périni, Hardÿ (1898). Batailles françaises, 1621 to 1643 Volume III (in French). Ernest Flammarion.
- Mitchell, Andrew Joseph (2005). Religion, revolt, and creation of regional identity in Catalonia, 1640-1643 (PHD). Ohio State University. Archived from the original on 2022-09-24.
- Bodart, Gaston (1908). Militär-historisches Kriegs-Lexikon (1618–1905).
