= Juan de Velasco, Count of Siruela =

Spanish noble and diplomat (1608-1652)

Juan Velasco de la Cueva y Pacheco (Madrid, 1608 - 1652), VIII Count of Siruela, was a Spanish noble, diplomat and Governor of the Duchy of Milan.

== Biography ==
He was a son of Gabriel de Velasco y la Cueva and Victoria Pacheco, and was baptized on 11 October 1608 the parish church of Santiago in Madrid.

He inherited the County of Siruela upon the death of his father in May 1625. On 24 October 1636 he was granted the habit of the Order of Calatrava. Loyal to the Count-Duke of Olivares, King Philip IV appointed him the following year ambassador to the Republic of Genoa, replacing Francisco de Melo. During his term in office, he renewed with their authorities a previous treaty that allowed the passage of Spanish troops through their territory and began talks with Prince Thomas Francis of Savoy.

In 1640, he was named governor and captain general of the Duchy of Milan in the absence of the Marquis of Leganés. Juan de Velasco took possession of his new responsibility in February 1641, but given his lack of knowledge in the military area and after a disastrous military campaign in 1642, he was replaced by the Marquis of Velada and returned to Spain in mid-1643.

At the end of that year, however, he obtained the embassy in Rome. He arrived in this city two hours before the 1644 papal conclave met to proceed to elect a new Pope, which allowed him to pressure the electors to elect the candidate supported by the Spanish Crown. Indeed, the Pro-Spanish Cardinal Giovanni Battista Pamphilj was elected and took the name of Innocent X.

In 1645 Juan Velasco, aware of the serious illness of the Italian Superior general of the Society of Jesus Mutio Vitelleschi, proposed to the monarch Philip IV that a general commissioner of the Society of Jesus be elected for the peninsula, in order to prevent the Order from falling into the hands of another foreigner with little devotion to the interests of Spain.

Back in Madrid that same year, he was named gentleman of the King's Chamber, but he never again held any other political office in the service of the Spanish Monarchy.
He died in 1652 without descendants and without having married, so the county of Siruela fell to his brother Gaspar de la Cueva y Pacheco.

Political offices
Preceded by Marquis of Leganés	Governor of the Duchy of Milan; 1641–1643	Succeeded by Marquis of Velada
