= Rooigembeek =

Location
- Country: Belgium

Physical characteristics
- Mouth: Wallebeek
  - coordinates: 50°54′58″N 3°38′51″E

Basin features
- Progression: Wallebeek→ Scheldt→ North Sea

The Rooigembeek is a small stream in East Flanders, Belgium. It is a right tributary of the Wallebeek, which is a left tributary of the Scheldt. In its upper course, it is called Leedsebeek. In British texts about the 1708 Battle of Oudenaarde, the stream is called Norken River, possibly after the Flemish village Nokere (Kruishoutem municipality), some 9 kilometres (6 mi) away.

Its source is in Wortegem (Wortegem-Petegem municipality), west of Oudenaarde. It flows in northwestern direction, and flows into the Wallebeek in Asper (Gavere municipality), north of Oudenaarde. The Rooigembeek is about 12 kilometres (7 mi) long.
