= Diego Felípez de Guzmán, 1st Marquis of Leganés =

Spanish politician

General Diego Mexía Felípez de Guzmán 4th Duke of Sanlúcar la Mayor 1st Marquis of Leganés Viscount of Butarque
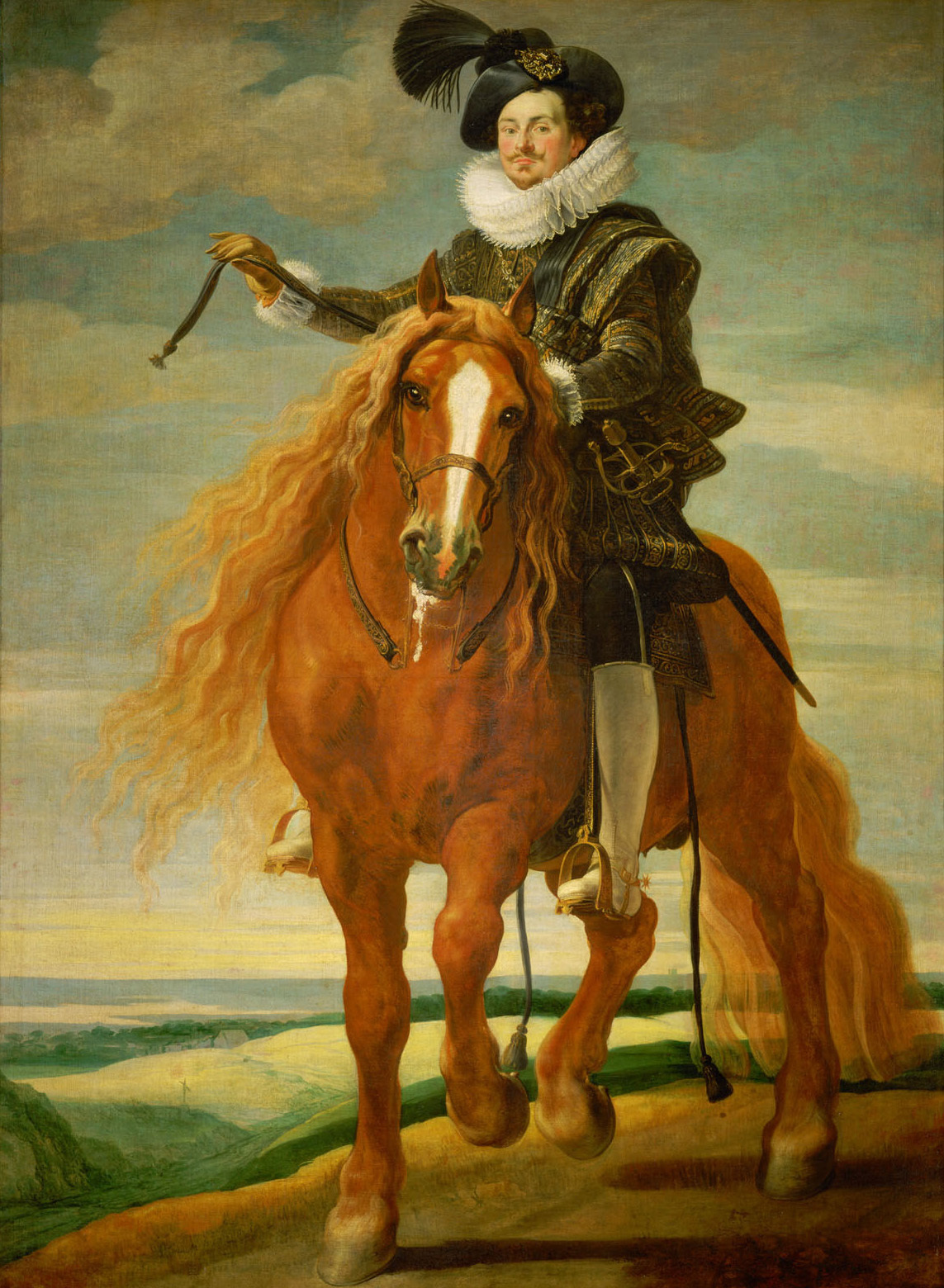
- The Marquis of Leganés by Anthony van Dyck, around 1634.
- Born: baptized 7 February 1582; Madrid, Spanish Empire
- Died: 16 February 1655 (aged 73); Milan, Duchy of Milan, Spanish Empire
- Spouse: Polissena Spinola
- Children: Gaspar Dávila Messía y Felípez de Guzmán; Ambrosio Ignacio Spínola y Guzmán
- Relatives: Diego Velázquez Dávila (father); Leonor de Guzmán y Ribera (mother); Count-Duke of Olivares (uncle)
- Military career
- Allegiance: Spanish Empire
- Service years: 1600–1655
- Rank: General
- Conflicts: Eighty Years' War: Anglo-Spanish War (1625–1630); Cádiz expedition (1625); Thirty Years' War: Battle of Nördlingen (1634); Conquest of the Fortress of Breme and Vercelli; Piedmontese Civil War: Siege of Turin (1640); Franco-Spanish War (1635–1659): Reapers' War; Battle of Lleida (1642); Siege of Lleida (1646)

President of the Supreme Council of Flanders
- In office 1629 – June 1653
- Monarch: Philip IV
- Valido: Luis de Haro
- Preceded by: Íñigo de Brizuela y Arteaga
- Succeeded by: Filippo Spinola, 2nd Marquis of Los Balbases

Governor of the Duchy of Milan
- In office 24 September 1635 – 19 December 1643
- Monarch: Philip IV
- Valido: Count-Duke of Olivares; Luis de Haro
- Preceded by: Fernando Afán de Ribera, 3rd Duke of Alcalá de los Gazules
- Succeeded by: Juan de Velasco, Count of Siruela

President of the Council of Italy
- In office June 1653 – 2 February 1655
- Monarch: Philip IV
- Valido: Luis de Haro
- Preceded by: Gaspar de Borja y Velasco
- Succeeded by: García de Avellaneda y Haro

Viceroy of Catalonia
- In office 1645–1647
- Monarch: Philip IV
- Preceded by: Andrea Cantelmo
- Succeeded by: Guillén Ramón de Moncada y Castro

Diego Messía Felípez de Guzmán, 1st Marquis of Leganés (baptised 7 February 1582 – 16 February 1655) was a Spanish politician and army commander. He crammed a long miliary career serving under different generals.

== Biography ==
Diego was the youngest son of Diego Velázquez Dávila y Bracamonte, Marquis of Loriana, and Leonor de Gúzman, aunt of the Count-Duke of Olivares.

Beginning in 1600, he fought during more than 20 years in the Spanish Netherlands in the service of Archduke Albert VII of Austria. After the Archduke's death, Diego returned to Spain where his cousin Olivares had become valido, and under his patronage, Diego soon became very influential.

After becoming a member of the State Council in 1626, he was made Marquis of Leganés in 1627 and that same year married Polixena Spinola, the daughter of general Ambrosio Spinola, Captain general of Spain's Army of Flanders.

In 1627, Leganés was sent back to Flanders to force the States General to accept Olivares' project of the Union of Arms, and pay for an extra 12,000 infantry soldiers. On his way back, he and general Ambrosio Spinola visited the Siege of La Rochelle by the French, on which occasion they discussed the succession of the Duchy of Mantua, which would eventually lead to the War of the Mantuan Succession.

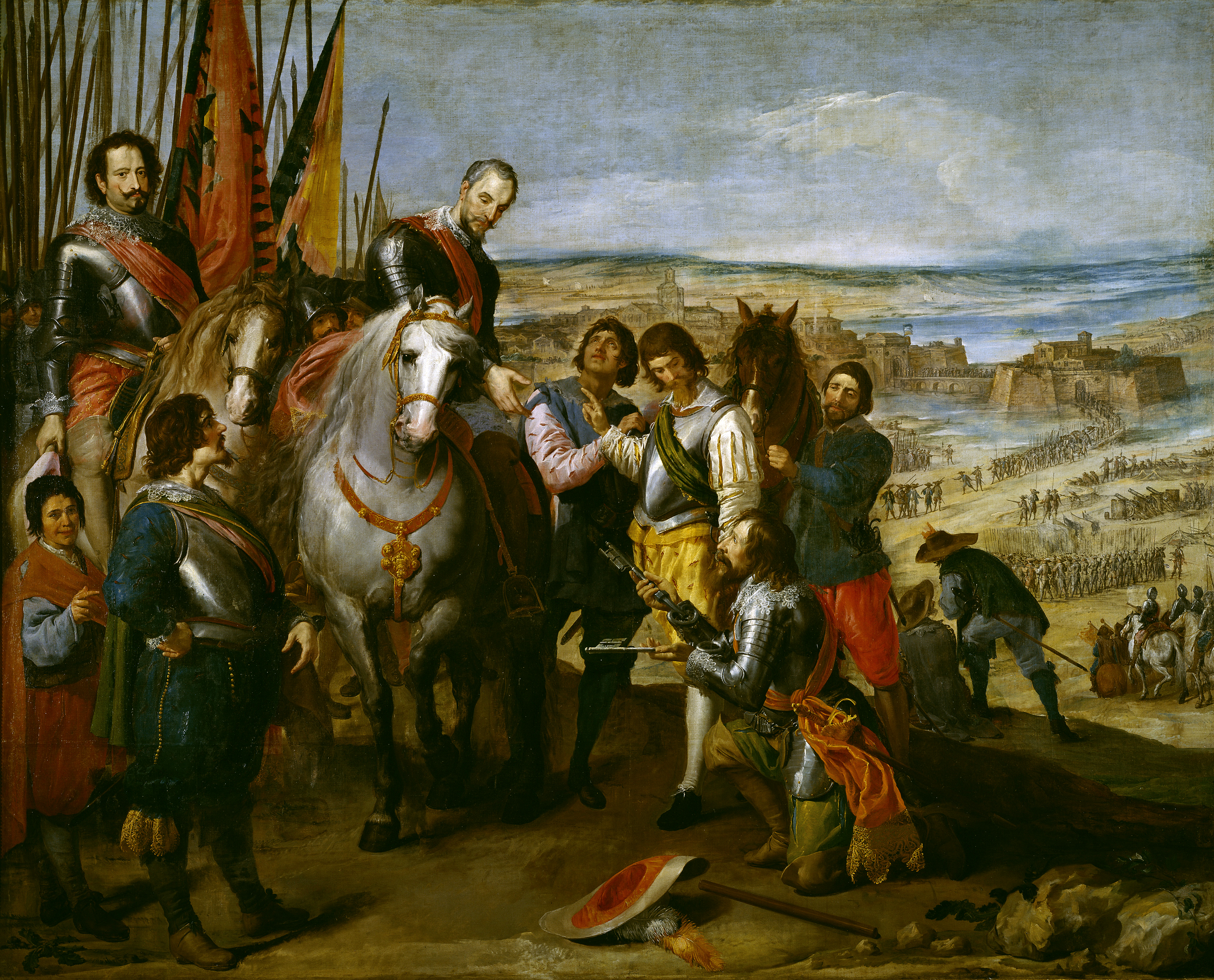
Spinola, with the Marquis of Leganés (on horse to the left) at the Surrender of Jülich by Jusepe Leonardo

In 1634, accompanied Cardinal-Infante Ferdinand in his way to the Netherlands, with Leganés being personally taked with replacing the late Duke of Feria. He fought then in the Battle of Nordlingen. After this mission, which earned him the title of Grandee of Spain, Leganés held several important political and military posts in the Spanish Netherlands.

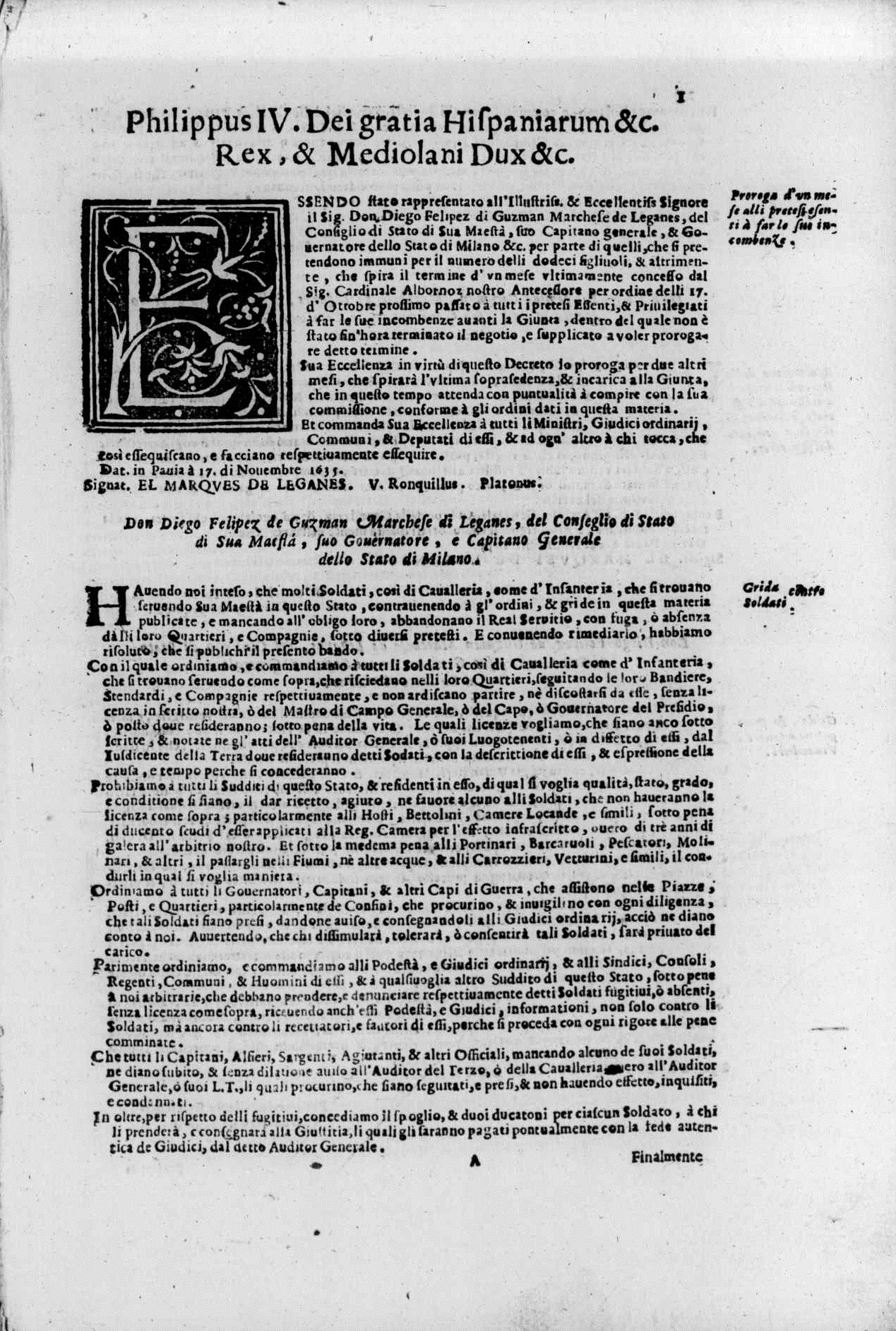
Libro delle gride (1645) of the Duchy of Milan

On 24 September 1635, Leganés was named Captain General and Governor of the Duchy of Milan, and was soon involved in the Franco-Spanish War (1635) and the Piedmontese Civil War against France, Parma, Mantua and Savoy. He besieged Odoardo Farnese, Duke of Parma and Piacenza and, with pressure from Pope Urban VIII, forced him to sign a peace treaty in 1637. Leganés also prevented the French from taking the Valtellina and won some victories against Savoy.

In 1638 Leganés conquered Breme and Vercelli, and the following year launched a great offensive against Piedmont. He conquered a large number of cities, but suffered a great defeat near Casale and failed at the Siege of Turin (1640).

Called back to Spain, in November 1641 Leganés was given the command of the army of Catalonia to push back the French and Catalan troops in the Catalan Revolt. After some initial successes in defending Tarragona, Leganés suffered a defeat in the Battle of Lerida (1642), which made him fall from grace.

In 1645 Leganés was rehabilitated and made nominal Viceroy of Catalonia where he defended successfully the retaken city of Lérida in 1646. He remained viceroy until 1648. He was appointed President of the Council of Italy in June 1653, holding the post until his death in Madrid on 16 February 1655.

== Marriage and children ==
First he married Polixena Spinola (died 1639), daughter of Ambrosio Spinola. They had two children:

- Gaspar Felípez de Guzmán y Spinola, 2nd Marquis of Leganés (died 1666), governor of Oran and Viceroy of Valencia.
  - Father of Diego Dávila Mesía y Guzmán, 3rd Marquis of Leganés (died 1711).
- Ambrosio Ignacio Mexía Felípez de Guzmán y Spinola (1632–1684), tutor of Balthasar Charles, Prince of Asturias and Archbishop.

He next married Juana Fernández de Córdoba y Rojas, daughter of Luis Fernández de Córdoba, 6th Duke of Sessa.

== Art collector ==
The Marquis of Leganés was also a great art collector, and his collection is said to have numbered 1,100 paintings in 1641.

== Sources ==
- Elliott, J. H. (2002). Imperial Spain 1469-1716. Penguin Books.
- Hanlon, Gregory (2019). The Hero of Italy: Odoardo Farnese, Duke of Parma, his Soldiers, and his Subjects in the Thirty Years' War. Oxford University Press. ISBN 978-0-19-258628-5.
- Malcolm, Alistair (2017). Royal Favouritism and the Governing Elite of the Spanish Monarchy, 1640-1665. Oxford University Press.

Political offices
Preceded by Cardinal Gil de Albornoz	Governor of the Duchy of Milan; 1635–1636	Succeeded by Fernando Afán de Ribera, duke of Alcalá de los Gazules
Preceded by Fernando Afán de Ribera, duke of Alcalá de los Gazules	Governor of the Duchy of Milan; 1636–1641	Succeeded by Juan de Velasco, Count of Siruela
