= Wijnendale =

Village in West Flanders, Belgium

Coordinates: 51°05′32″N 3°03′58″E

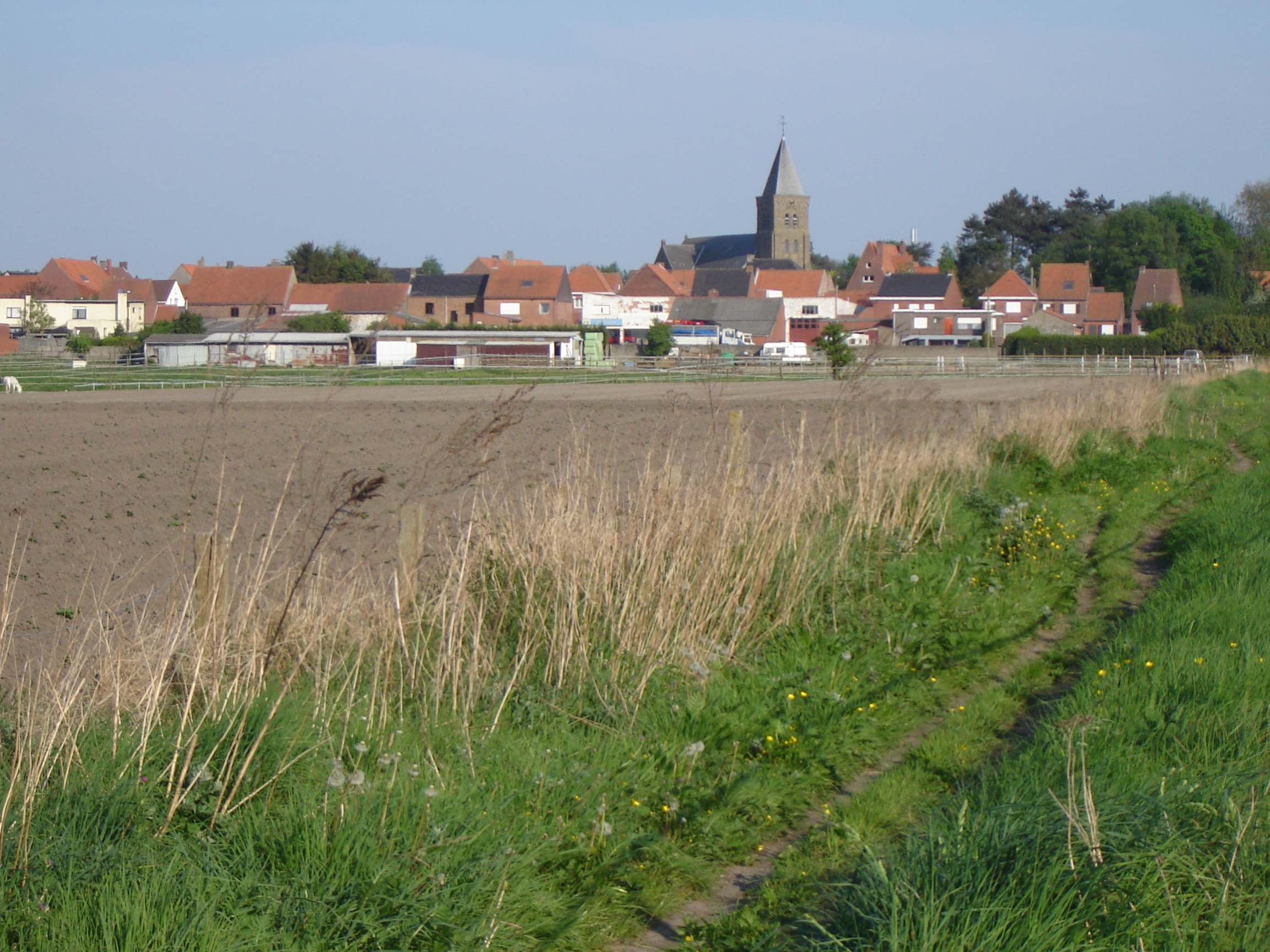
A view over Wijnendale

Wijnendale is a village located in the Belgian province of West Flanders.

It belongs to the municipality of Torhout. Wijnendale is situated at 4 km from the city center of Torhout, halfway in between this city center and Ichtegem.

The village used to belong to the municipality of Ichtegem, but was moved to the municipality of Torhout in the 1970s.
Wijnendale is situated on a plateau 40 metres above sea level, some 20 metres higher than the surrounding countryside.

== Historical importance ==
- Wijnendale Castle, which played an important role throughout Belgian history.
- The Battle of Wijnendale, fought on 28 September 1708 as part of the War of Spanish Succession.
