= Siege of Barcelona (1651) =

1651–1652 siege of Barcelona

Coordinates: 41.4019°N 2.1667°E

- Part of the Reapers' War and the Franco-Spanish War
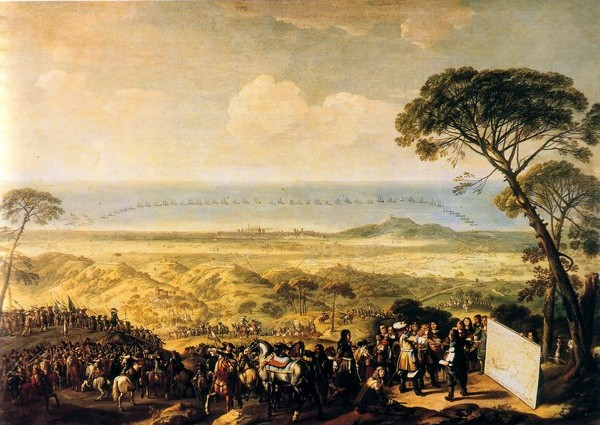
- Oil painting of the siege by Pandolfo Reschi.
Date	July 1651 – October 1652
Location	Barcelona, Principality of Catalonia
Result	Spanish victory

Belligerents
France; Principality of Catalonia	Spain

Commanders and leaders
(Kingdom of France) Philippe de La Mothe-Houdancourt (Kingdom of France) Jean de Marsin; Francesc de Mostarós	(Spain) John of Austria

The siege of Barcelona took place between July 1651 and October 1652 during the Reapers' War when a large Spanish army descended on Barcelona and besieged the garrison made up of Catalans and French troops under Philippe de La Mothe-Houdancourt.

The fifteen-month siege eventually ended with a Spanish victory, and the effective defeat of the Catalan Revolt which had lasted since 1640, being the Principality of Catalonia reincorporated into the Monarchy of Spain. Although French troops remained in parts of Catalonia for another seven years, no serious fighting took place, and in 1659 the Treaty of the Pyrenees was signed bringing a formal end to the conflict.
