= Siege of Ghent (1708) =

- Part of the War of the Spanish Succession
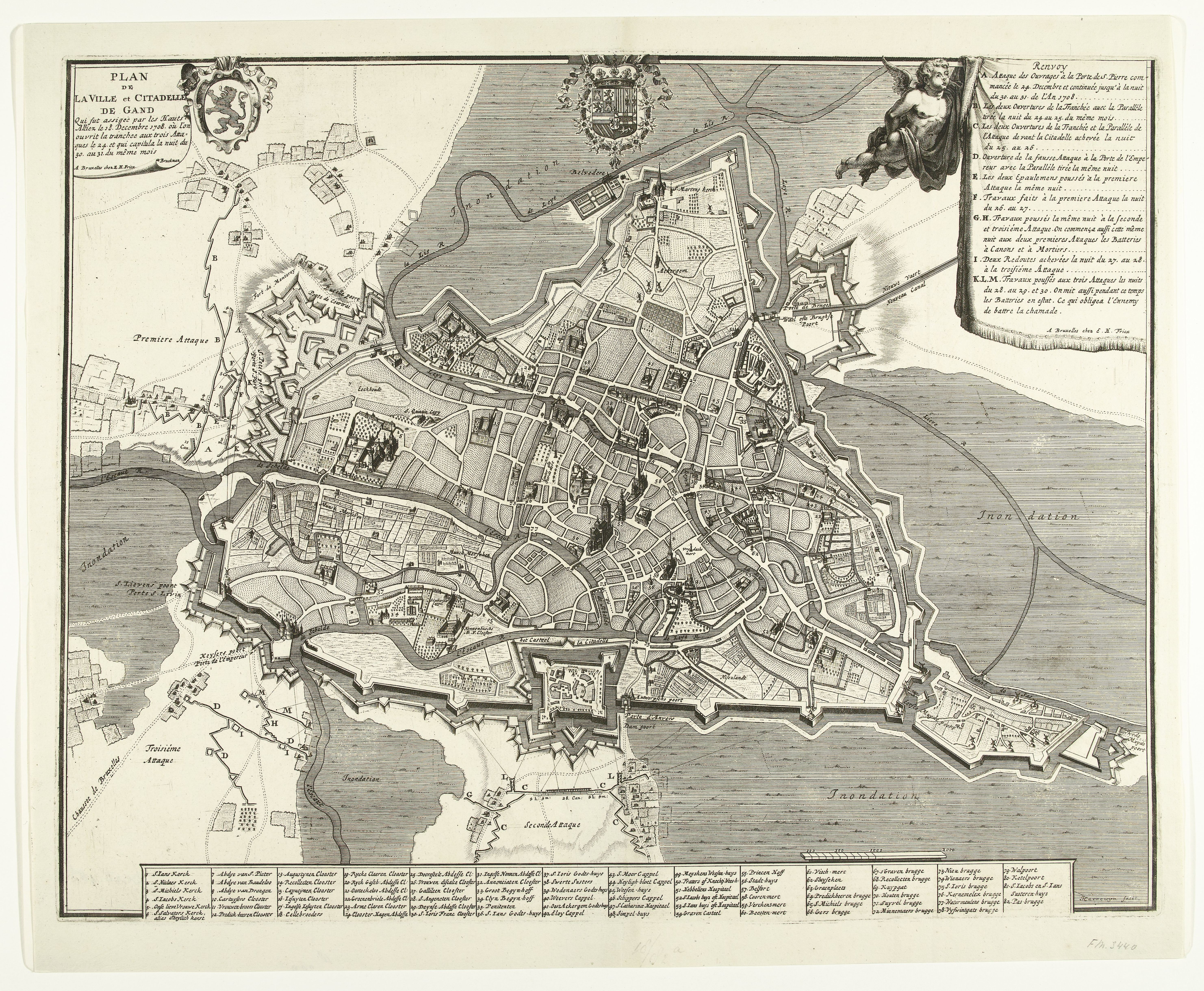
- Map of the siege of Ghent
Date	18–30 December 1708 (1 week and 5 days)
Location	Ghent 51°03′00″N 3°43′00″E
Result	Grand Alliance victory

Belligerents
Dutch Republic; Great Britain; Holy Roman Empire	Kingdom of France

Commanders and leaders
Duke of Marlborough	Count de la Mothe

Strength
77,000	17,000

Casualties and losses
200	Minimal
- Location within Belgium

The siege of Ghent (18–30 December 1708) was the last operation of the 1708 campaign season during the War of the Spanish Succession. After successfully taking Lille shortly before, the Duke of Marlborough moved his forces onto the town of Ghent where after a 12-day siege the town's governor, Count Charles de La Mothe-Houdancourt, surrendered.

== Background ==
The War of the Spanish Succession was triggered by the death of Charles II of Spain, who had no children. He left the Spanish throne to Philip of Anjou, a member of the French House of Bourbon, but the Archduke Charles of Austria also felt he had a claim to the throne. The Grand Alliance of Great Britain, the Dutch Republic, the Holy Roman Empire and Habsburg Spain, declared war on France and Bourbon Spain in May 1702.

== Prelude ==
During the 1708 campaign of the War, the Duke of Marlborough, commanding the Alliance's army in the Low Countries, planned with the Dutch commanders to move all of their forces to attack the French. They were caught by surprise when the French captured Ghent in July, gaining control of the Flanders waterways, and making it impossible for the Alliance to leave Brussels undefended. Marlborough recovered with victories over the French at Oudenarde and then laying siege to French-held Lille. Though Marlborough suffered huge losses during the siege, estimated to be around 15,000, he succeeded in taking Lille after 120 days, on 10 December 1708.

== Siege ==
The French, believing that the fighting had concluded for the winter, had broken their army up after the loss of Lille, but Marlborough decided to make one more push in an effort to retake Ghent. His army arrived in the town on 18 December, where they found a defence consisting of around 17,000 with instructions to defend the town to the last. The Alliance army had laid down its trenches by 24 December, and made a foray the following day which was driven back. On 28 December, the attackers had established their artillery, and bombarded the town with mortar. The Governor of Ghent, the Count de la Mothe, sent out soldiers under a flag of truce, setting out terms of surrender unless a relieving force arrived by 2 January. As no such force appeared, he relinquished the town on that date to Marlborough. In a letter sent by Marlborough to the Secretary of State, Henry Boyle, he described it took the French defenders "from ten in the morning till seven at night" to evacuate the town.

== Aftermath ==
Bruges capitulated shortly thereafter, while the smaller garrisons of Plassendale and Leffinge were evacuated. Only a few days after the capture of Ghent a harsh winter set in, described as "one of the most brutal in contemporary memory" by the historian Jamel Ostwald, and there was no further fighting in the Low Countries until the following June.

== Sources ==
- Nimwegen, Olaf van (1995). De subsistentie van het leger: Logistiek en strategie van het Geallieerde en met name het Staatse leger tijdens de Spaanse Successieoorlog in de Nederlanden en het Heilige Roomse Rijk (1701-1712) [The subsistence of the Allied and especially the Dutch army during the War of the Spanish Succession] (Thesis) (in Dutch). Universiteit Utrecht.
