= Siege of Turin (1640) =

1640 siege

- Part of the Piedmontese Civil War
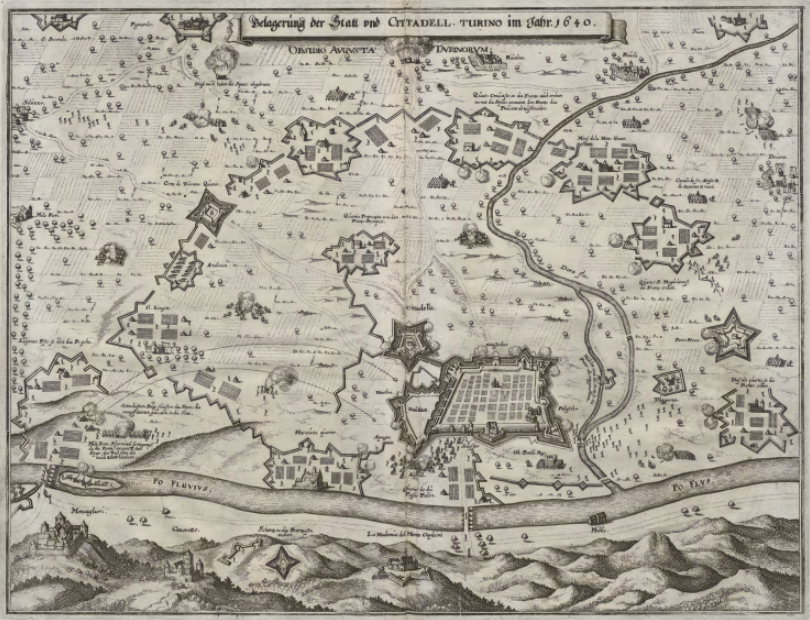
- Siege of Turin’s Citadel (engraving by M. Merian/C. Cappi)
Date	22 May – 20 September 1640
Location	Turin (present-day Italy) 45°04′00″N 7°42′00″E
Result	Franco-Piedmontese victory

Belligerents
Kingdom of France (Duchy of Savoy) Regency faction	(Spain) Spanish Empire (Duchy of Savoy) Prince Thomas faction

Commanders and leaders
(Kingdom of France) Henri Comté de Harcourt-Lorraine (Kingdom of France) Vicomte de Turenne (Duchy of Savoy) Princess Christine	(Spain) Don Felipe Marquis of Leganés (Duchy of Savoy) Prince Tommaso Francesco of Carignano

Strength
10,000	12,000 (Turin); 15,000 (Relief force)

Casualties and losses
4,000	9,000

The 1640 siege of Turin (22 May–20 September 1640) was a major action in two distinct wars: the Franco-Spanish War (1635–59) and the Piedmontese Civil War. When Thomas Francis, Prince of Carignano and his Piedmontese faction captured Turin, the French garrison supporting the Regent Christine Marie of France retired within the citadel and continued to resist. A Franco-Piedmontese army led by Henri de Lorraine, count of Harcourt and Henri de la Tour d'Auvergne, Vicomte de Turenne invested the forces under Prince Thomas within the city. Finally, a Spanish army under Diego Felipez de Guzmán, Marquis of Leganés appeared and encircled the French besiegers.

In this triple siege, the Spanish army surrounded the French army, which surrounded Prince Thomas' Piedmontese army, which surrounded the French controlled citadel. In the end the French prevailed; Prince Thomas surrendered on terms and was allowed to march his troops elsewhere, leaving Turin in French control. Turin is nowadays a major city in the northwest part of modern-day Italy.

== Background ==
Thomas Francis, Prince of Carignan and his supporters had seized the city of Turin in 1639, but French troops supporting the Regent Christine Marie of France continued to hold the citadel. Under normal conditions in this period, it was not possible for a town to be held against a hostile citadel, but the anti-French forces managed to construct barricades that contained the French in the citadel, and spent the winter of 1639–40 under an uneasy truce. On 10 May, the French army under Henri de Lorraine, count of Harcourt and Henri de La Tour d'Auvergne, Viscount of Turenne began a siege of the town. The French army counted 6,000 foot soldiers and 3,500 cavalrymen. The French were supported by 3,500 Piedmontese.

== Siege ==
After pushing in most of the defenders' outposts and building the usual lines of investment, the besiegers opened fire on 22 May. On 31 May a Spanish army under the governor of Milan, Diego Felipez de Guzmán, Marquis of Leganés, approached, but despite his numerical superiority dared not make a full-scale assault on Harcourt's lines, so he himself began to entrench around the French, starting a weeks-long conflict over individual posts but, despite constant pressure from Prince Thomas, only once risking an outright battle, in mid-July (14 July according to Saluzzo, 11 July according to Hanotaux and Bérenger), when he was thoroughly repulsed.

The situation was particularly complicated in that Prince Thomas in Turin continued for weeks to hold some posts outside the city, ensuring some contact with the Spanish and a line of communication for supplies; the last such post fell to Harcourt late in July, and after this, food shortages began to hit the population and garrison - forage for horses ran out first, and Thomas twice attempted sorties, on 23 and 31 July, intended to enable his cavalry to escape, but failing both times. Harcourt was never completely cut off by Leganés from his lines of communication, and he was of course in contact with the citadel, but it is fair to agree with the traditional view that this had now become a four-layered siege: French troops still in the citadel were under attack by Thomas in the city, who was himself besieged by Harcourt and the French army, who was himself besieged by Leganés. It is sometimes suggested that Leganés tried to fire supplies over the French camp into the city, but this may be a legend, built on the fact that the Spanish did maintain written contact with Prince Thomas by messages placed inside cannonballs and fired over the French heads.

== Surrender ==
Turin eventually had to consider surrender, and Prince Thomas, who had maintained on-off talks with the French and the Regent throughout the siege, opened negotiations with Harcourt, who made an agreement contrary to orders - if the French historian Hanotaux is to be believed, he was unaware of orders en route from Paris that he was to accept nothing from Thomas except pure surrender as a prisoner or agreement to enter French service; according to Saluzzo, Harcourt knew that Cardinal Richelieu's agent Mazarin was on his way with orders but wanted to avoid sharing the glory of a victory with anyone else so hastened to reach a settlement before Mazarin arrived. Whatever the cause, Harcourt agreed a cease-fire on 16 September and granted Thomas honourable terms in the capitulation signed on 20 September, and on 24 September Thomas marched out with his troops and withdrew to Ivrea.

== Sources ==
- Saluzzo, Alessandro di. Histoire militaire du Piémont. Turin, 1859 (vol. 4, pp. 121–41)
- Hanotaux, Gabriel. Histoire du cardinal de Richelieu. Paris, 1933-1947 (vol. 6, pp. 43–5)
- Bérenger, Jean. Turenne. Paris, 1987 (pp. 159–60)
- Longueville, Thomas (1907). Marshal Turenne. Robarts - University of Toronto. London: Longmans, Green.
- Bodart, Gaston (1908). Militär-historisches Kriegs-Lexikon (1618–1905).
