= Le Fayel =

- Commune
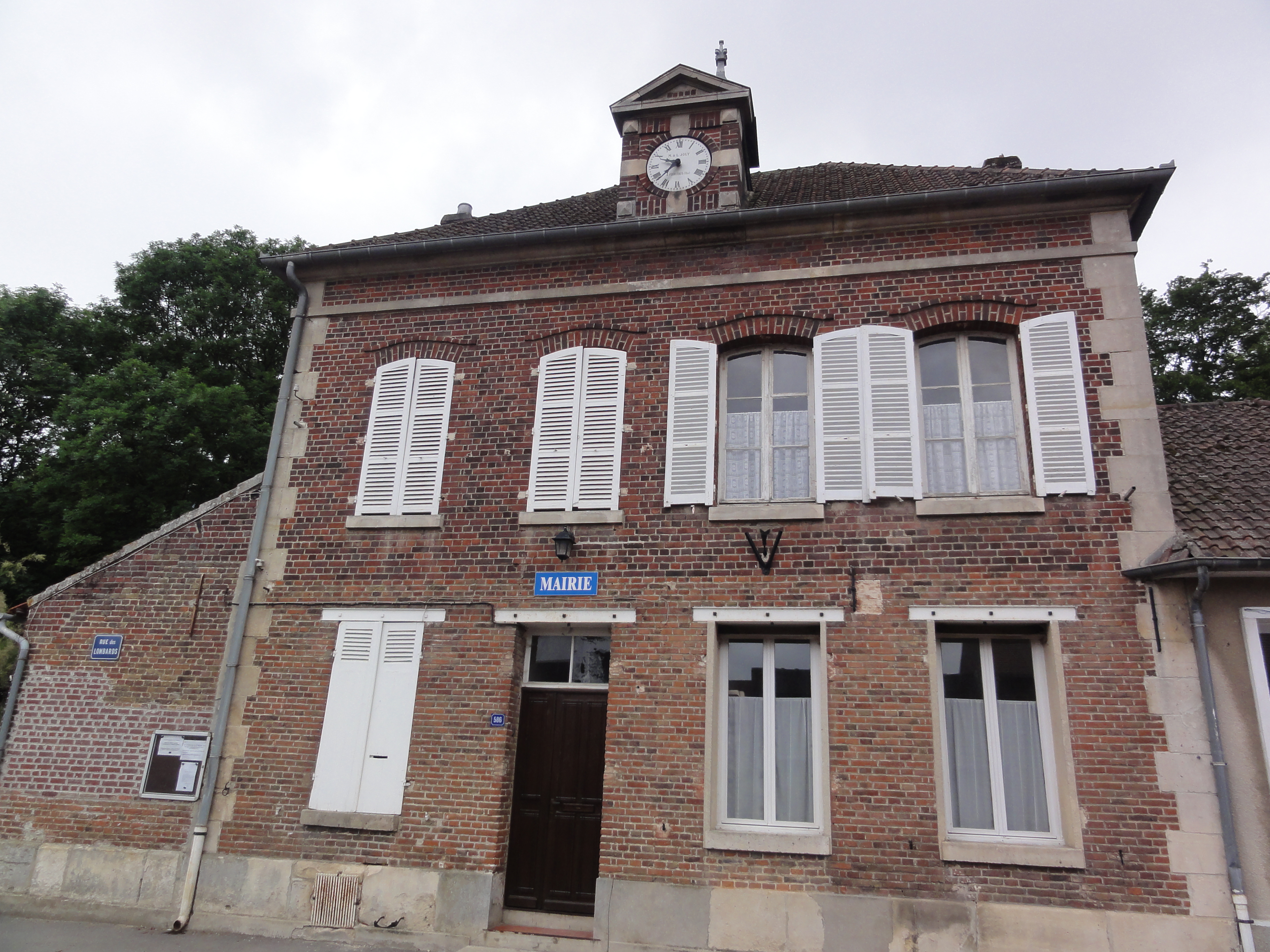
- The town hall in Le Fayel
- Location of Le Fayel
- Location within France Location within Hauts-de-France
- Coordinates: 49°22′22″N 2°41′58″E
- Country: France
- Region: Hauts-de-France
- Department: Oise
- Arrondissement: Compiègne
- Canton: Estrées-Saint-Denis
- Intercommunality: Plaine d'Estrées

Government
  - Mayor (2020–2026): Isabelle Fafet
- Area^{1}: 2.56 km^{2} (0.99 sq mi)
- Elevation: 60 m (200 ft)
- Highest elevation: 81 m (266 ft)
- Lowest elevation: 47 m (154 ft)
- Population (2023): 233
  - Density: 91.0/km^{2} (236/sq mi)
- Time zone: UTC+01:00 (CET)
  - Summer (DST): UTC+02:00 (CEST)
- INSEE/Postal code: 60229 /60680
- ^{1} French Land Register data, which excludes lakes, ponds, glaciers > 1 km^{2} (0.386 sq mi or 247 acres) and river estuaries.

Le Fayel (French pronunciation: [lə fajɛl]) is a commune in the Oise department in northern France.

== See also ==
- Communes of the Oise department
