= Battle of Oudenarde =

Battle in the War of the Spanish Succession

- Part of the War of the Spanish Succession
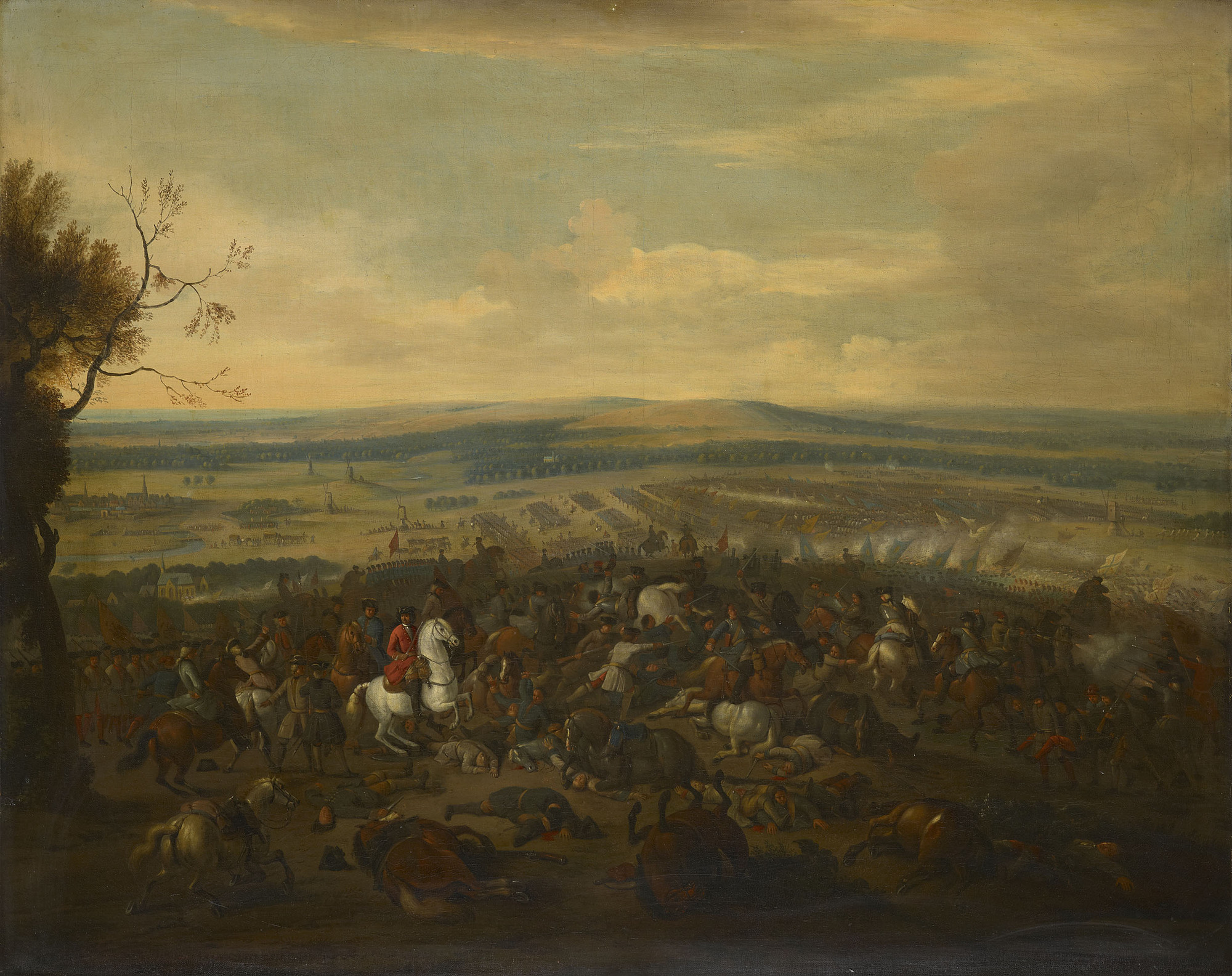
- The Battle of Oudenarde, by Jan van Huchtenburg.
Date	11 July 1708
Location	Oudenaarde, Spanish Netherlands 50°51′N 3°26′E
Result	Anglo-Dutch victory

Belligerents
Dutch Republic; Great Britain	France

Commanders and leaders
Duke of Marlborough; Eugene of Savoy (Dutch Republic) Lord Overkirk	Duke of Burgundy; Duke of Vendôme

Strength
90,000	90,000

Casualties and losses
3,000–6,000	9,000–14,000

The Battle of Oudenarde, also known as the Battle of Oudenaarde, was a major engagement of the War of the Spanish Succession, pitting an Anglo-Dutch force consisting of eighty thousand men under the command of the Duke of Marlborough, Lord Overkirk and Prince Eugene of Savoy against a French force of eighty-five thousand men under the command of the Duc de Bourgogne and the Duc de Vendôme, the battle resulting in a great victory for the Grand Alliance. The battle was fought near the city of Oudenaarde, at the time part of the Spanish Netherlands, on 11 July 1708. With this victory, the Grand Alliance ensured the fall of various French territories, giving them a significant strategic and tactical advantage during this stage of the war. The battle was fought in the later years of the war, a conflict that had come about as a result of English, Dutch and Habsburg apprehension at the possibility of a Bourbon succeeding the deceased King of Spain, Charles II, and combining their two nations and empires into one.

The engagement itself came about after a series of offensive and defensive manoeuvres between an Allied army under the command of Marlborough and a French army under the command of the Duc de Bourgogne. The two French commanders quarrelled about the direction their army should take, although roughly a month before the battle, the French army moved westwards and captured the Allied-held fortresses of Bruges and Ghent. This proved to be an unexpected and worrying action to Marlborough, who waited until Eugene had joined his army before he decided to undertake any offensive operations. The French moved to attack again, aiming to capture the city of Oudenaarde, which would cut off communication and supply routes between Marlborough and England and thus allow for a significant victory over the Grand Alliance. Marlborough managed to figure out the French plan of action, and forced marched his men towards Oudenaarde to defend it from the expected French attack. On 11 July, the two forces met near the city.

During the engagement, Allied cavalry moved to engage the French forward positions, killing or capturing many soldiers and pushing them back. For unknown reasons, a significant portion of the French army kept in reserve was never ordered to move up and engage, thus leading to a significantly weakened force facing the Allies. The infantry battalions on both sides moved to engage each other, with skilled deployment of cavalry by Cadogan ensuring the rout of many of the French infantry battalions, weakening their positions. Both sides settled into an engagement on opposing sides of the river, with several further mostly fruitless cavalry charges attempted by both sides. Marlborough initiated a flanking manoeuvre, gaining the allies a significant tactical and strategic advantage. Faced with mounting casualties, the French commanders made the decision to withdraw from the field. The battle was the third major victory that Marlborough had obtained during the war, boosting his military renown alongside that of Eugene, whose tactical contributions were vital to this victory.

== Background ==
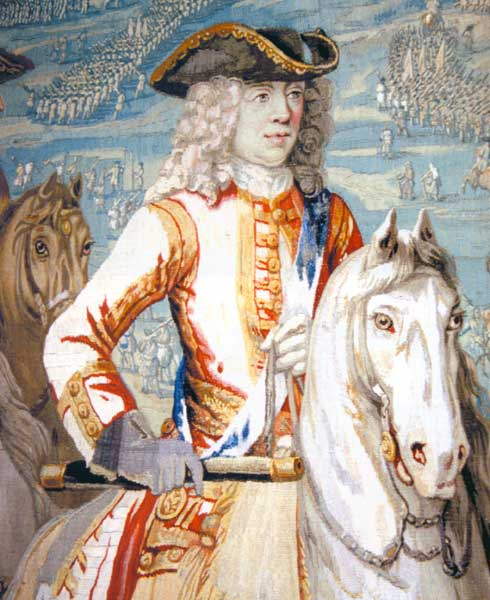
The Duke of Marlborough at Oudenaarde.

The War of the Spanish Succession, fought from 1701 to 1714, was a European conflict in the early 18th century, triggered by the death of the childless Charles II of Spain in November 1700, the last Habsburg monarch of Spain. His closest heirs were members of the Austrian Habsburg and French Bourbon families; acquisition of an undivided Spanish Empire by either threatened the European balance of power and thus the other leading powers became involved. Charles bequeathed an undivided monarchy of Spain to his grandnephew Philip, who was a grandson of Louis XIV of France. Philip was proclaimed King of Spain on 16 November 1700. Disputes over territorial and commercial rights led to war in 1701 between the Bourbons of France and Spain and the Grand Alliance, whose candidate was Charles, younger son of Leopold I, Holy Roman Emperor. (Note: The Habsburgs were rulers of Austria and Hungary in their own right; Emperor of the Holy Roman Empire, technically an elected position, had been held by the Habsburgs since 1438.) The primary opponents of the Bourbon succession were the Kingdom of England (later the Kingdom of Great Britain after the Acts of Union with Scotland), the Holy Roman Empire and the Dutch Republic. In addition, many Spaniards opposed the idea of a Bourbon ruling Spain, and threw their lot in with Charles. Initially, the war went favourably for the French, given their vast army and navy and extremely advantageous geopolitical position. However, crushing defeats at Blenheim and Ramillies caused the war to settle into a stalemate, as the forces of the Grand Alliance could not advance into French territory, nor could the French advance into Habsburg territories either.

As the French army moved closer to the border with the Spanish Netherlands in 1708, the two French commanders began quarrelling over which battle plan they should adopt. Vendôme wished to attack the city of Huy, which could draw Marlborough in pursuit of his forces and weaken the overall allied position. The eventual plan adopted, however (under direct orders from Louis XIV), was to attack Flanders. The French army moved eastward, until they reached the city of Braine-l'Alleud, which was about twenty-five kilometres south of Brussels, and allowed the French to threaten the nearby city of Leuven. Marlborough moved his forces to a few miles south of Leuven, in order to sufficiently protect both cities from a potential French assault. The French army then remained inactive for more than a month, not making any major movements whatsoever. This allowed the much-delayed Eugène to bring his forces across the Rhine and head towards Marlboroughs position. On 5 July, however, the French unexpectedly moved westward, quickly capturing the cities of Bruges and Ghent (although about three hundred British soldiers held out in Ghent for a few days). This unexpected move both demoralised and confounded Marlborough and his army, and he did not make any offensive moves until Eugène along with his army arrived to join him. The French army had control over the entire length of the Scheldt from the French border to the newly taken city of Ghent.

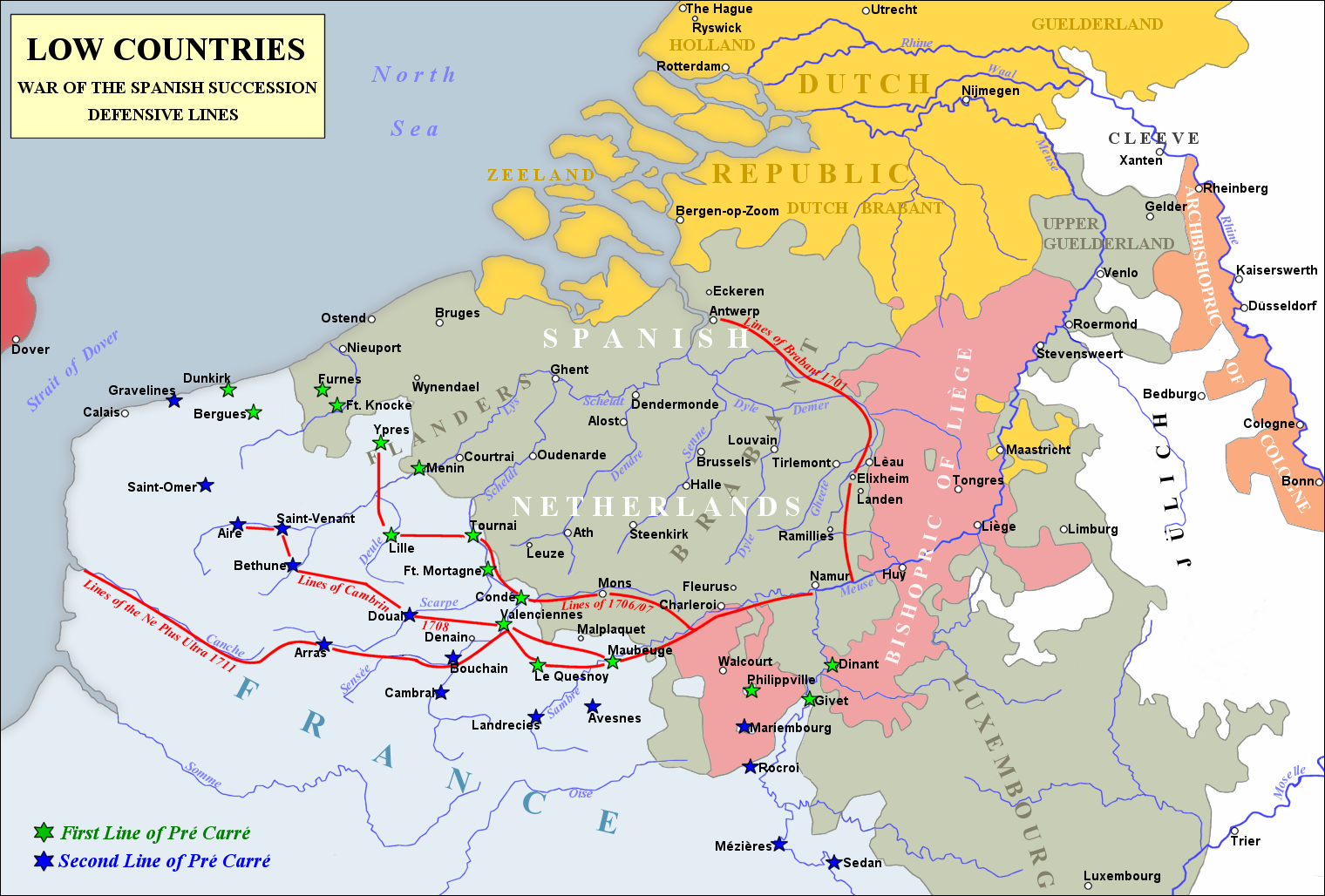
Campaign map of the Low Countries during the War of the Spanish Succession.

Only one Allied fortress remained: the city of Oudenaarde. If the French managed to capture that city, Marlborough's army would be cut off from the coast, causing them to lose communication with England. Marlborough managed to guess the French battle plan, and also correctly guessed the method by which the French army would attempt to take Oudenarde—they would march down the east bank of the Scheldt (closer to Marlborough's troops), while leaving a large covering force between the two opposing armies. The French army set out on 8 July, marching toward the city of Lessines. However, Marlborough made one of the most impressive forced marches in history, capturing the city on 10 July. This forced the French commanders to attempt to simply to wade across the Scheldt and take Oudenaarde from that position. Marlborough again ordered a forced march of his troops. This time, though, he ordered eleven thousand troops to hold the main crossing point across the Scheldt, under the command of his Quartermaster General, William Cadogan. Cadogan's force built five additional pontoon bridges to allow Marlborough to get his eighty-thousand-strong army across the river, until French foragers discovered the allied presence around 9:00 a.m., initiating the battle.

== Battle ==
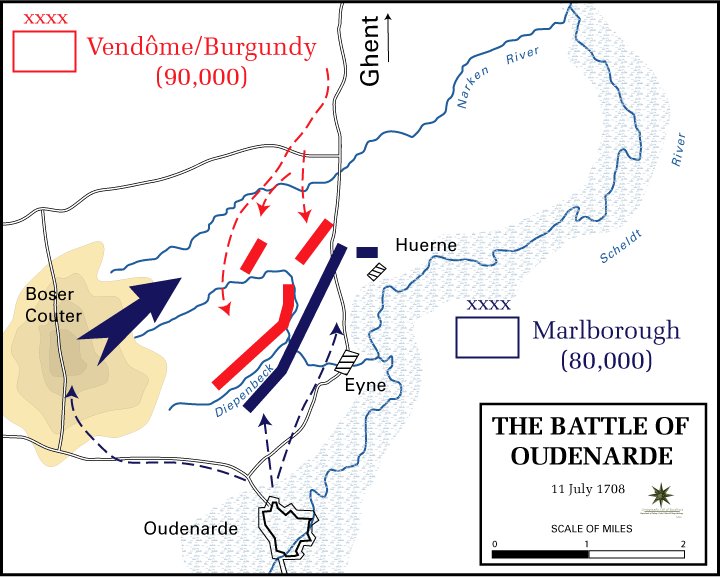
Map of the battle.

Cadogan, a British cavalry commander, ordered some dragoons under the command of Danish general Jørgen Rantzau to capture men from the French advance guard. Many of those troops managed to escape and alerted Lieutenant General Charles-Armand de Gontaut, duc de Biron, who commanded the French vanguard to the presence of Allied troops on the west bank. When de Biron advanced, he was disagreeably surprised by the large number of Allied cavalry already across the river, along with the approaching Allied infantry. Although he was ordered to attack by Vendôme, he hesitated upon seeing the reinforced line of twenty infantry battalions (including the four that had been left to guard the pontoon bridges). Biron's own forces comprised only seven infantry battalions and twenty cavalry squadrons. He had been given reliable advice that cavalry could not negotiate the marshy terrain in the area and decided not to attempt a crossing. At this time, Eugene, along with twenty squadrons of Prussian cavalry, moved across the river and occupied crucial positions. While Biron's troops were manoeuvring, the leading British infantry brigade had arrived, under the command of John Campbell, 2nd Duke of Argyll. Cadogan, given authority from Marlborough, attacked Biron's seven infantry battalions of Swiss mercenaries with his division (consisting mainly of cavalry). The isolated Swiss mercenaries were immediately pushed back and the Allied force destroyed Biron's units, until they reached a large mass of French cavalry, at which point they were forced to retire, outnumbered. The force which performed this action was Rantzau's cavalry, with the future King George II among them.

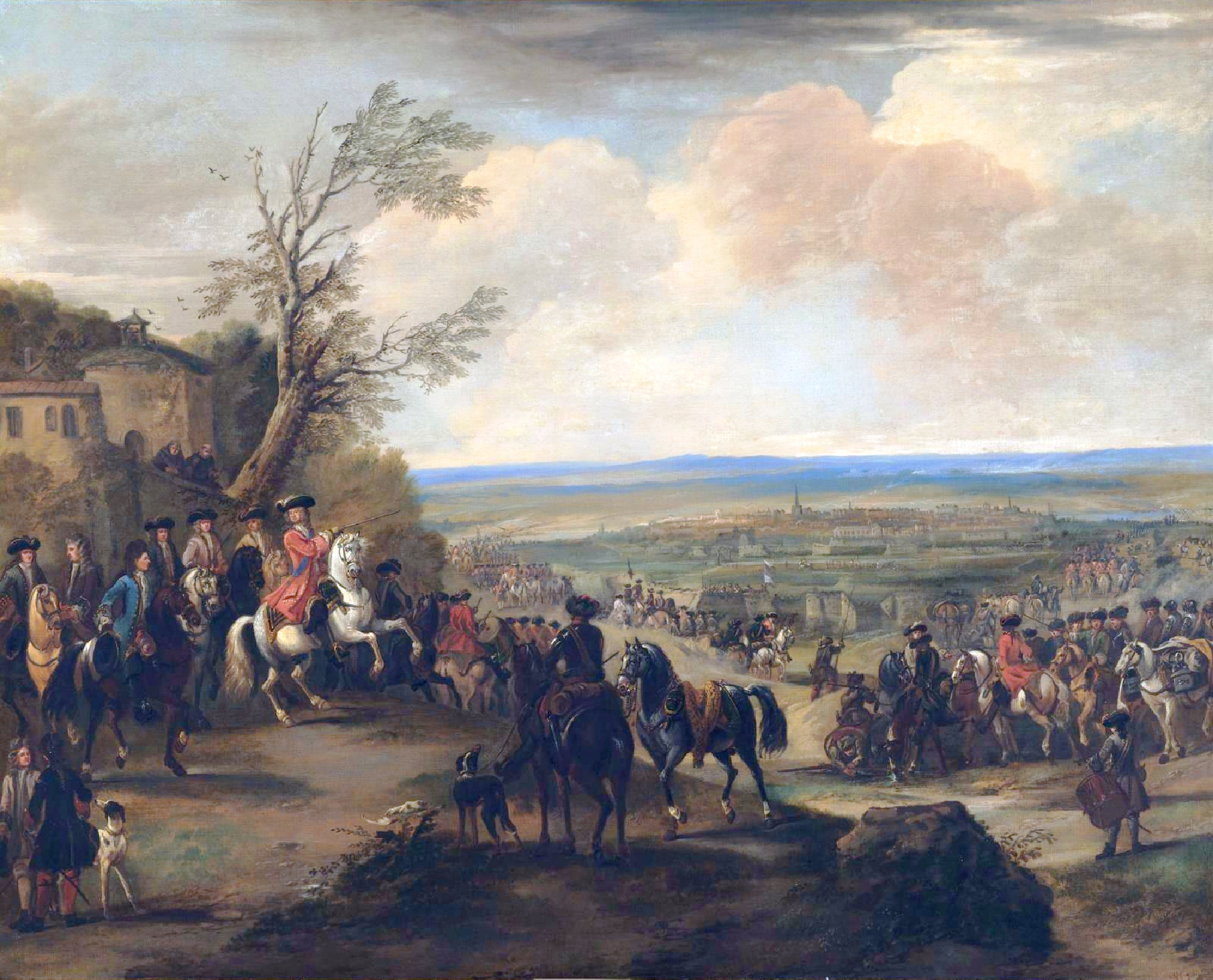
The Duke of Marlborough at the Battle of Oudenaarde, by John Wootton.

Burgundy, making another mistake, decided to launch an attack, over protests by Vendôme. The French right wing began to attack the Allied positions near Eine, while the left wing, for unknown reasons, remained stationary near Huise. A very strong position was held by the Allied left wing. Twenty-eight cavalry squadrons protected the right flank of Cadogan's infantry, which would receive the attack, which proceeded at about 4:00 p.m.. Burgundy ordered the assault, which landed on Prussian cavalry squadrons under Dubislav Gneomar von Natzmer. Although intense fighting ensued, the attack was dispersed. Then, Vendôme made a dubious tactical decision to personally lead an attack of twelve infantry regiments, fighting hand-to-hand with a half-pike. This meant that while one commander (Burgundy) was in his headquarters with no view of the ongoing battle, the other commander was personally fighting in the field, with no possibility of directing his men. Most historians agree that had the French left wing attacked the weakened Allied right wing, it would have been forced to retreat. Vendôme realized this, asking Burgundy for permission to attack with the left wing. Burgundy sent back a messenger with a message of refusal but the messenger failed to deliver the message. The situation worsened with Vendôme believing that support would arrive for his troops, who were lengthening their line of battle and threatening to envelop the Allied left flank. As French infantry regiments approached, they lengthened the Allied line but too slowly and not great enough in extent to prevent the French from threatening the Allied positions.

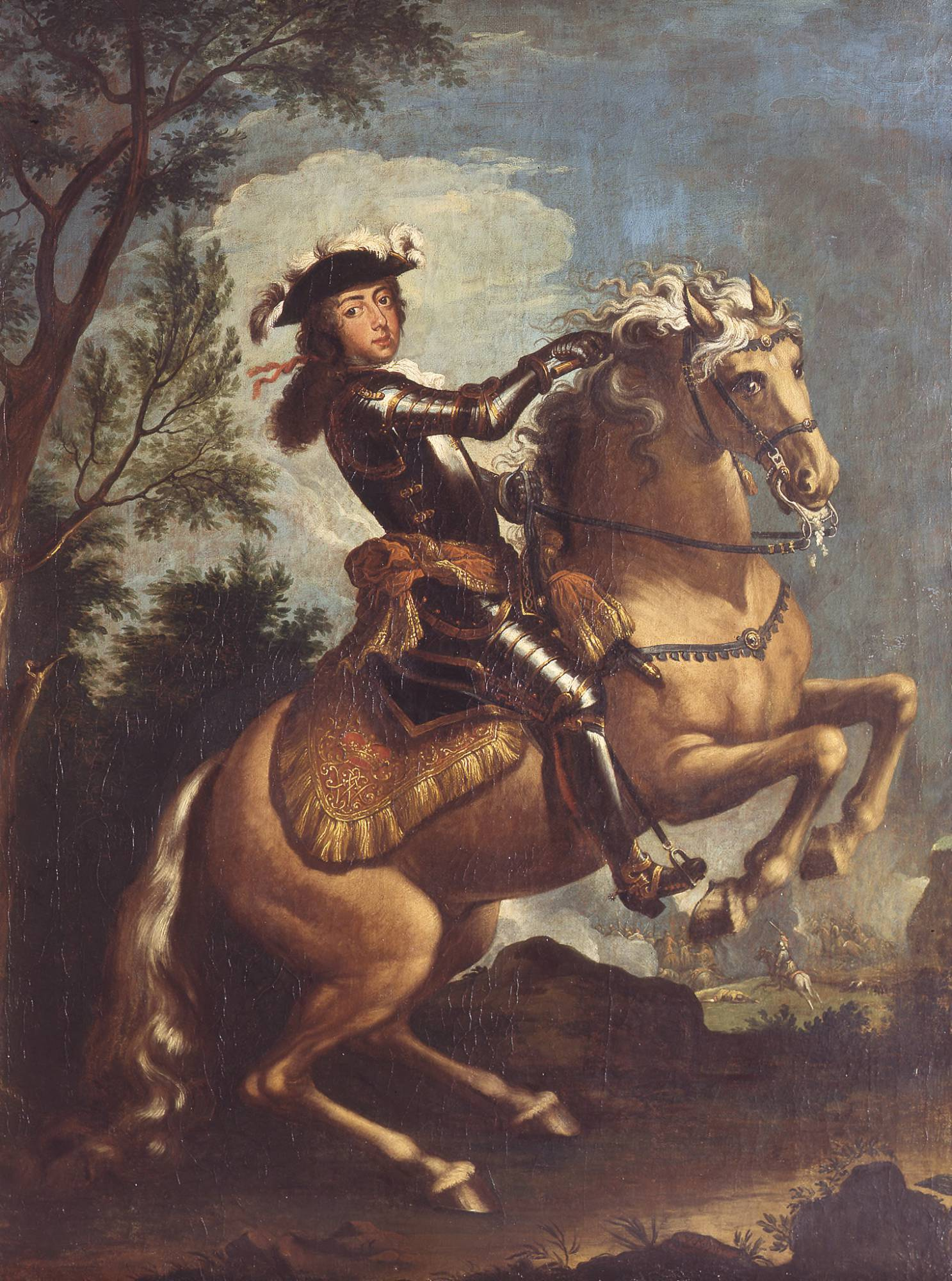
The young Prince of Orange received much praise from in and outside the Dutch Republic for his decisive role in his first major battle.

Around the same time, the Dutch field deputies Sicco van Goslinga and Adolf Hendrik van Rechteren moved near where Marlborough was leading the army. They perceived him to be unsteady and indecisive, possibly as a result of accidentally falling into a deep ditch with his horse on the night of 10 July. Concerned over what they saw, Goslinga and Van Rechteren requested Eugene, who had so far remained in the background, to intervene and assume supreme command of the Allied army. Following some urging, as he was not in either British or Dutch service, Eugene gave in and stated: "Well now gentlemen... I will do what you ask of me."

As a result, Marlborough moved his headquarters to the army's left flank, while Eugene assumed command of the right flank, which checked the left wing of the French army. While the right wing was under pressure, Marlborough placed 18 newly arrived Hessian and Hanoverian infantry battalions in the left flank to replace 20 Prussian battalions under Carl von Lottum, and ordered the Prussians to move to support Eugene's men. This moved fresh troops to the critical Allied left flank, while reinforcing the Allied right flank and allowing Lottum's troops to be granted a vital rest. Marlborough then began formulating a new plan of double encirclement. He had now under his command 25,000 fresh Dutch troops under Lord Overkirk, and ordered them to flank the French right wing. Overkirk was unable to cross the collapsed pontoon bridges near Oudenaarde and instead used the city's stone bridges, which delayed his troops by an hour. Marlborough went ahead with his plan, having Eugene's cavalry charge towards Burgundy's headquarters. The Maison militaire du roi de France were only just able to turn them back and Marlborough, with only 18 Hessian and Hanoverian battalions, was only able to keep the French right in check. At approximately 6 pm, Overkirk's troops arrived and were in a position to flank the French right wing in conjunction with a dual attack by Marlborough and Eugene.

Overkirk had sent his two leading infantry brigades under Major-general Coenraad Weck through a gap in the woodlands to strengthen Marlborough’s left, while he himself had made a circumferential move, more to the left, with the rest of his troops. However, Eugene became concerned about the left wing and sent Goslinga and Van Rechteren there with orders to attack the French. Arriving there, Goslinga discovered an exhausted Overkirk. According to Goslinga, Overkirk did not seem to see the urgency of an attack. Unsatisfied, Goslinga then rode off to a line of six battalions where he encountered Lieutenant-general Bengt Oxenstierna, who likewise had no intention of attacking, arguing that the terrain was too rugged to pass through and that they were better off waiting for the French. Goslinga then decided to take it upon himself to launch the attack and placed himself at the head of two Swiss battalions which he ordered to advance. Five Dutch battalions followed and the Prince of Orange placed eight others alongside Goslinga in battle order. Goslinga and the Prince marched down the slope with roughly 10,000 infantrymen and crashed into the French infantry, whom they quickly swept aside. A counterattack by the Maison militaire du roi de France did little to change the situation:

Our Swiss, who were determined to wait for them with the bayonet fixed on the rifle and only shoot at the very last moment were so quiet that I was amazed... the hail of musket balls, with which the French cavalry was received, cut down some and routed the rest.

At the same time, the Dutch cavalry under the Count of Tilly cut off the French retreat route to Kortrijk. Much of the French army was routed or captured, with lack of daylight preventing the completion of the manoeuvre. The battle also ended in confusion for the Allies. The darkness caused their right and left wings to mistake each other for French troops and engage in friendly fire. Eugene on the right and the Prince of Orange on the left intervened and put an end to the friendly fire before the Allied army inflicted serious damage on itself.

== Aftermath ==
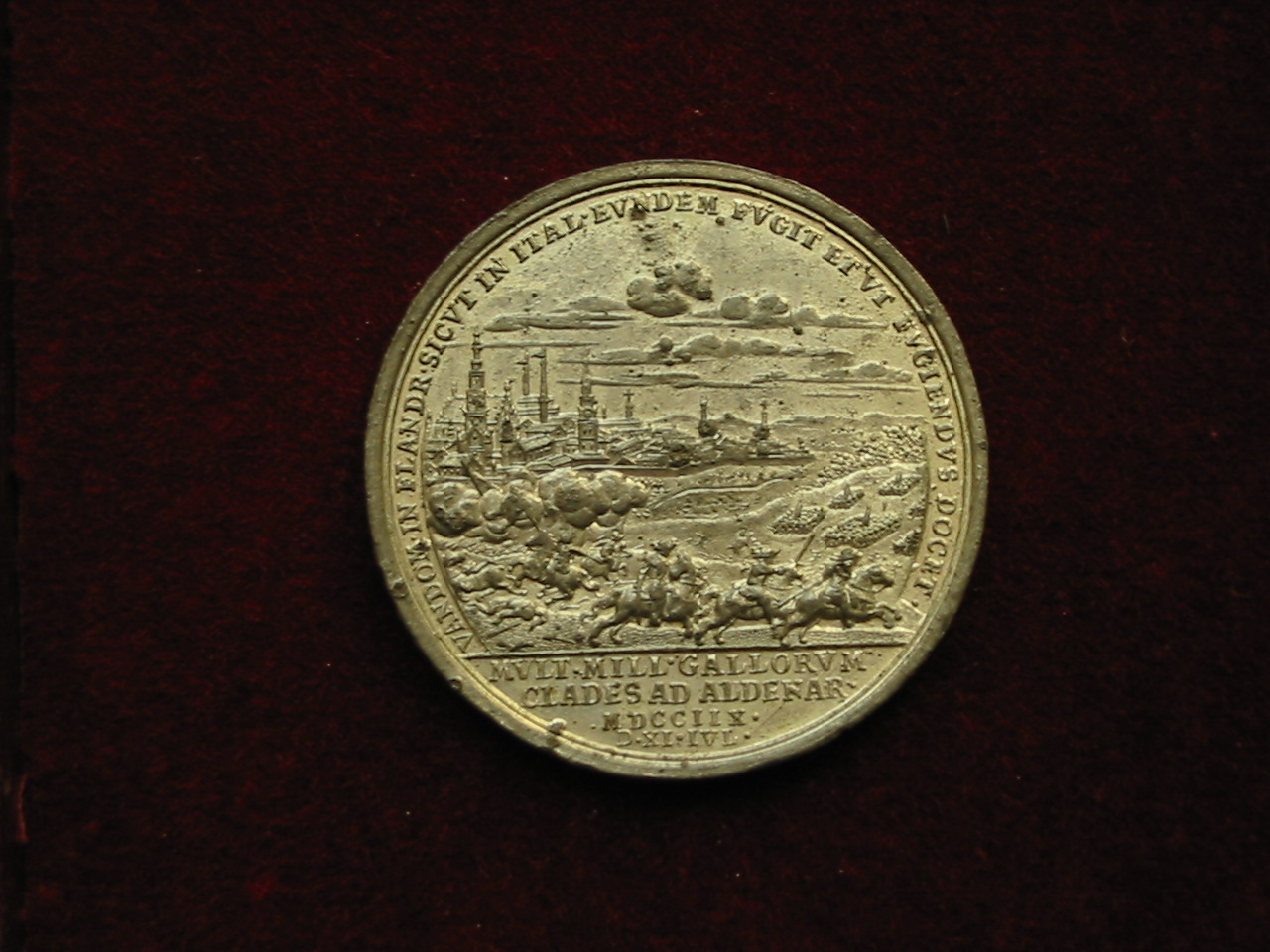
Pewter medal struck to commemorate the battle, reverse side.

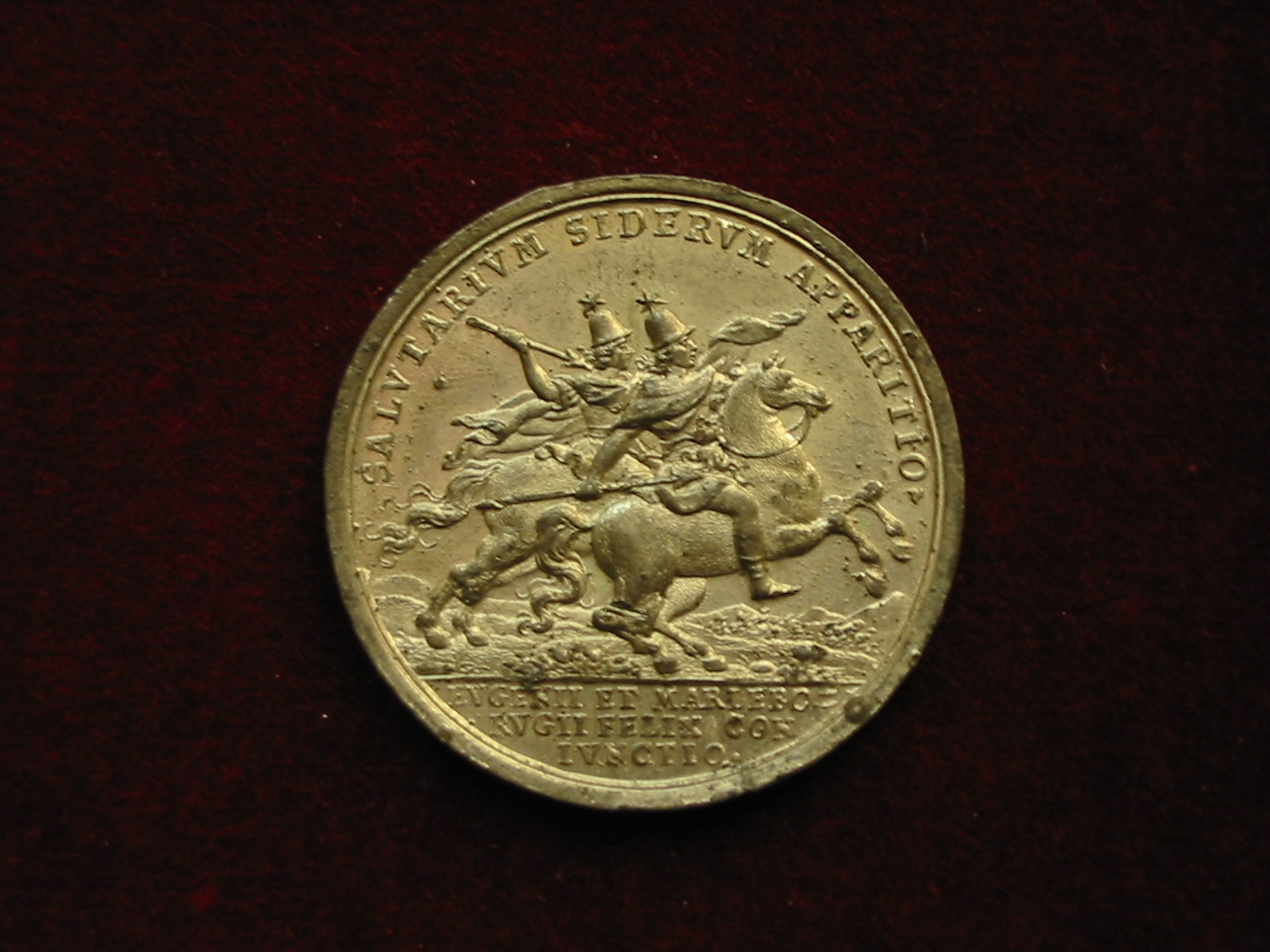
Commemorative medal struck after the battle, depicting the victorious allied commanders as the Dioscuri.

The French army retreated in disorder towards Ghent, with the Duc de Bourgogne and the Duc de Vendome quarreling amongst themselves on who was to blame for the defeat. Only nightfall and a few broken pontoon bridges saved the French army from total annihilation. For unknown reasons, about half of the total forces the French had at their disposal during the battle were kept in reserve, never being called up to participate in the battle. There was a great mass of French cavalry and infantry in some raised ground north of the Norken River along with many of Burgundy's troops that remained inactive in the battle and did not advance forwards to assist their fellow Frenchmen, even when the tactical situation had turned against them with the arrival of Overkirk's Dutch troops. Many of the French cavalry squadrons had remained in reserve, mainly because of the advice that they had been given of the ground before them being impassable by their horses.

The French commanders had made several catastrophic tactical errors during the battle: The entire French left wing (the troops under Burgundy and the large mass north of the Norken) was kept in reserve. They could easily have destroyed the weakened right wing of the Allied army. Had a concerted attack been carried out, with Vendôme attacking with his main body to envelop the Allied right flank and Bourgogne attacked with the left wing (before Overkirk and the rest of Argyll's troops arrived), the French army could have easily won. The decision of Vendôme to march personally into battle may have provided a welcome boost to French morale, but it denied him for the rest of the battle the opportunity to command his troops, which proved disastrous when the Allies overwhelmed the French via a flanking manoeuvre. The French army had lost about fourteen to fifteen thousand soldiers overall (with about eight thousand of whom becoming prisoners-of-war) and twenty-five artillery guns, while the Allies lost roughly three thousand men. Bodart gives roughly similar numbers for the French casualties (6,000 killed or wounded and 8,000 captured), but higher numbers for allied ones (6,000 killed or wounded).

On the other hand, the reputation of the Allied commanders were greatly enhanced by the victory. For Marlborough, his eye for choosing the correct ground, his sense of timing and his keen knowledge of the enemy were again amply demonstrated. Eugene's reputation was also enhanced—while Marlborough remained in overall command, Eugene had led the crucial right flank and centre. Once again the Allied commanders had co-operated remarkably well. "Prince Eugene and I," wrote the Duke, "shall never differ about our share of the laurels." The success restored the strategic initiative to the Allies, who now opted to besiege Lille, the strongest fortress in Europe. While the Duke commanded the covering force, Eugene oversaw the siege of the town, which surrendered on 22 October. However, it was not until 10 December that the resolute Boufflers yielded the citadel. Yet for all the difficulties of the winter siege, the campaign of 1708 had been a remarkable success by requiring superior logistical skill and organisation. The Allies reppelled an Assault on Brussels, retook Brughes and Ghent, and the French were driven out of almost all the Spanish Netherlands: "He who has not seen this", wrote Eugene, "has seen nothing".

== See also ==
- Siege of Lille (1708)

== Bibliography ==
- Lynn, John A., The Wars of Louis XIV: 1667–1714 (Longman Publishers: Harlow, England, 1999).
- Scott, Christopher (2008). The Battle of Oudenarde. Leigh-on-Sea, Essex: Partizan Press. ISBN 978-1-85818-570-5.
- Chandler, David (1973). Marlborough as Military Commander (1989 ed.). Spellmount Publishers Ltd. ISBN 978-0946771127.
- Chesterton, G. K. (1917). A Short History of England. BiblioBazaar. ISBN 0-554-10672-8.
- Childs, John (2014). General Percy Kirke and the Later Stuart Army. Bloomsbury Academic. ISBN 978-1474255141.
- Bodart, Gaston (1908). Militär-historisches Kriegs-Lexikon, (1618–1905).
- Van Nimwegen, Olaf (2020). De Veertigjarige Oorlog 1672-1712: de strijd van de Nederlanders tegen de Zonnekoning (The 40 Years War 1672-1712: the Dutch struggle against the Sun King) (in Dutch). Prometheus. ISBN 978-90-446-3871-4.
- Garrison, F.H. (1970). Notes on the history of military medicine. Legare Street Press. ISBN 978-1397937636.
- De Graaf, Ronald (2021). Friso: het tragische leven van Johan Willem Friso [Friso: the tragic life of John William Friso] (in Dutch). Boom. ISBN 978-90-2443-676-7.
- Wijn, J.W. (1959). Het Staatsche Leger: Deel VIII-2 Het tijdperk van de Spaanse Successieoorlog (The Dutch States Army: Part VIII-2 The era of the War of the Spanish Succession) (in Dutch). Martinus Nijhoff.
- Dhondt, Frederik (2008). "De Slag bij Oudenaarde en de Spaanse Successieoorlog" [The Battle of Oundenarde and the War of the Spanish Succession] (PDF). Oudenaarde 1708: Een Stad, Een Koning, Een Veldheer (in Dutch): 25–75.
- Bosscha, Johannes (1838). Neêrlands heldendaden te land, van de vroegste tijden af tot in onze dagen (in Dutch). Suringar.
- Knoop, Willem Jan (1867). Krijgs – en geschiedkundige geschriften. Volume 8 [Military and historical writings. Volume 8] (in Dutch). H. A. M. Roelants.
- Churchill, Winston (1936). Marlborough: His Life and Times. George G. Harrap Co. Ltd London.
