= Siege of Hulst (1702) =

Siege in the War of the Spanish Succession

Assault on Hulst
- Part of the War of the Spanish Succession
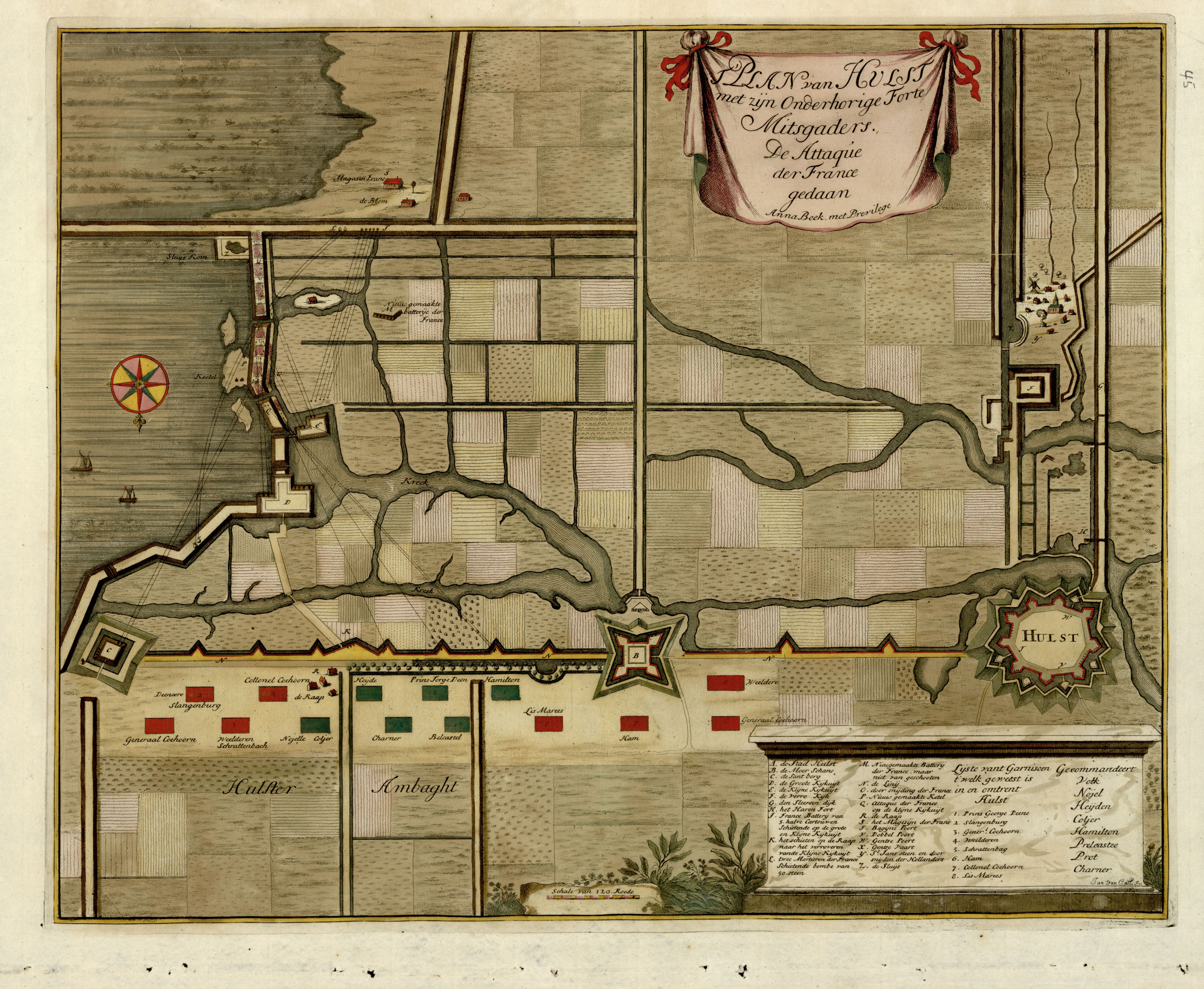
- Map of the attack on Hulst
Date	27 August – 2 September
Location	Hulst, Dutch Republic
Result	Dutch victory

Belligerents
France; Bourbon Spain	Dutch Republic

Commanders and leaders
(Kingdom of France) Vauban (Spain) Bedmar	(Dutch Republic) Dedem

Strength
20 battalions 5 squadrons (c. 8,600 men)	8 battalions (c. 4,800 men)

Casualties and losses
c. 1,300 killed or wounded	52 killed or wounded

The siege of Hulst or assault on Hulst occurred during the War of the Spanish Succession, between 27 and 2 September 1702. Vauban and Bedmar, commanding 20 battalions of French and Spanish troops attempted to divert Allied forces from the siege of Venlo. However the attack was unsuccessful and failed to keep the Allies from capturing Venlo. This makes Hulst the only place to have successfully resisted a siege by Vauban.

== Prelude ==
Key locations of the 1702 campaign, using modern borders

In May 1702, the Dutch Republic, England and the Holy Roman Emperor had declared war on France and the War of the Spanish Succession had begun. French troops had taken up positions in the Spanish Netherlands and in Germany before the war and were directly threatening the Dutch border. An Allied army under the Prince of Nassau-Usingen had already began the siege of Kaiserswerth, in Germany, on 18 April to secure the eastern flank of the Dutch Republic. The Duke of Boufflers' French army, to save Kaiserwerth, had pursued a Dutch covering force, under the Earl of Athlone, all the way to the gates of Nijmegen, but he failed to take Nijmegen or bring Athlone's force to battle. Kaiserswerth thus fell in June and the focus of the campaign shifted westward.

With the arrival of the Duke of Marlborough, the reinforced Allied army marched south, drove the French back and planned to lay siege to the fortress of Venlo on the Meuse. It was for this reason that, on August 20, Boufflers proposed to King Louis XIV that a diversion in Flanders was the only way to halt the Allied advance along the Meuse. In response, the king ordered Vauban and Bedmar to launch an attack on Hulst.

The attack on Hulst had little chance of success. While its fortifications were not particularly formidable, its strategic location made it difficult to approach and nearly impossible to encircle. To the east, Hulst was connected via the Moervaart to the flooded land of Saaftingen, protected by Forts Zandberg and Moerschans, which were linked to the city by an entrenched defensive line. To the west, the Zwanenkreek provided access to Axel, while the Hellegat in the north ensured supply lines from Zeeland remained open.

As a result, Hulst was only vulnerable from the south, where attackers could advance via three routes: the dike between Clinge and Kieldrecht, the road through Sint-Jansteen, or the dike leading to Fort Moerspui. These approaches were heavily fortified. The western approach was defended by Fort Moerspui and smaller redoubts, while the eastern Clinge dike was blocked by Fort Kijkuit and De Voorkijk. The entire southern defense was reinforced by a fortified line linking Forts Moerschans and Zandberg. According to French reports, the dike at this position was just eight feet wide (about two meters) and further secured by heavy palisades and artillery, making an assault highly challenging.

On 24 August, Bedmar set out from near Antwerp with 9 battalions, 5 squadrons, and 10 artillery pieces. By 26 August, he reached Stekene, just south of Hulst, where he was reinforced by 4 additional battalions from the Land of Waas. Orders were also sent to la Mothe to advance with the troops stationed between Ghent and Bruges.

== The French assault ==
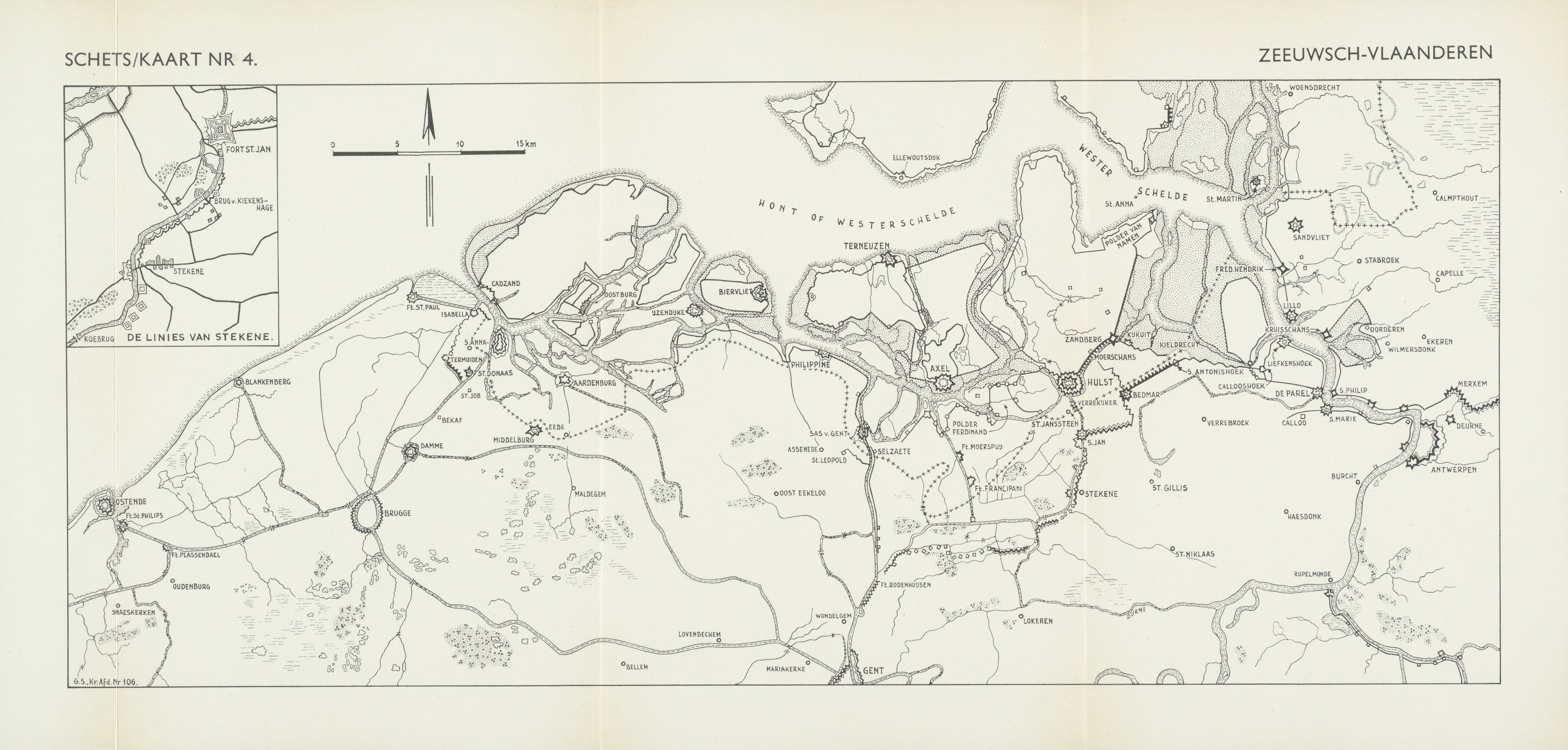
Map of the region during the opening years of the War of the Spanish Succession.

On the night of 26–27 August, three French columns advanced toward Hulst, aiming to seize the fortress or at least its key outer defenses by surprise.

- The left column, under De Ximènes (three battalions and three squadrons), was tasked with attacking Fort Moerspui but was reportedly blocked by rising tides that made the approach impassable. The failure to wait for low tide remains questionable.
- The central column, led by De Courtebonne (three battalions), successfully captured the outposts of Sint-Andries, Kwaadpaardsgat, and on 28 August, Fort Ferdinand. These positions were lightly defended but still put up resistance.
- The right column, under De Thoy (three battalions), faced delays and only attacked on 30 August, advancing along the Clinge dike. Beforehand, they established a battery near Vuilmoer, east of Hulst, which began bombarding Fort Kijkuit on 29 August.

On 30 August, men under De Thoy stormed and seized the forward position of Voorkijk, located in front of Kijkuit. However, Dutch commander General Dedem swiftly launched a counterattack from Kijkuit, reclaiming the position. A second French assault temporarily secured it and the French launched two consecutive assaults on Kijkuit but were repelled with heavy losses. Dedem soon retook Voorkijk once again.

When the French army first appeared before Hulst, the city was defended by only three relatively weak regiments—those of the elder and younger Coehoorn and Schratenbag. However, reinforcements quickly arrived, including the regiments of Welderen, Hem, Losekaat, and Nassau. Supplies were sent from Goes, while Rear Admiral De Boer transported additional artillery and a sufficient number of musketeers from Middelburg. With these reinforcements, Hulst was soon so well fortified that its capture became nearly impossible.

The arrival of La Mothe at Sint Jansteen on 30 August with 4 battalions of infantry and a regiment of dragoons did little to aid the French. Their advance towards Hulst was effectively halted by the intense fire from a Dutch battery of 15 guns stationed at the outer fortification De Verrekijker. Despite steadily increasing their numbers—eventually amassing around 20 battalions before Hulst—the French still deemed their forces insufficient. They requested reinforcements from the main army, and on 1 September, a detachment under D'Usson, consisting of 6 battalions and 6 squadrons, was dispatched from Lier towards Flanders.

However, it is unlikely that these additional troops would have made any difference in a siege where the approaches to the fortress were few and extremely narrow. In the end, Vauban and Bedmar did not even wait for D'Usson's arrival. After Vauban informed Louis of the additional supplies and reinforcements required for a formal siege, the King ordered its termination. On 2 September, the French high command decided to lift the siege. Dutch sources contradict this, stating that the retreat was not ordered until 5 September and that, during the night of 3–4 September, a failed French assault on De Voorkijk resulted in heavy casualties.

== Aftermath ==
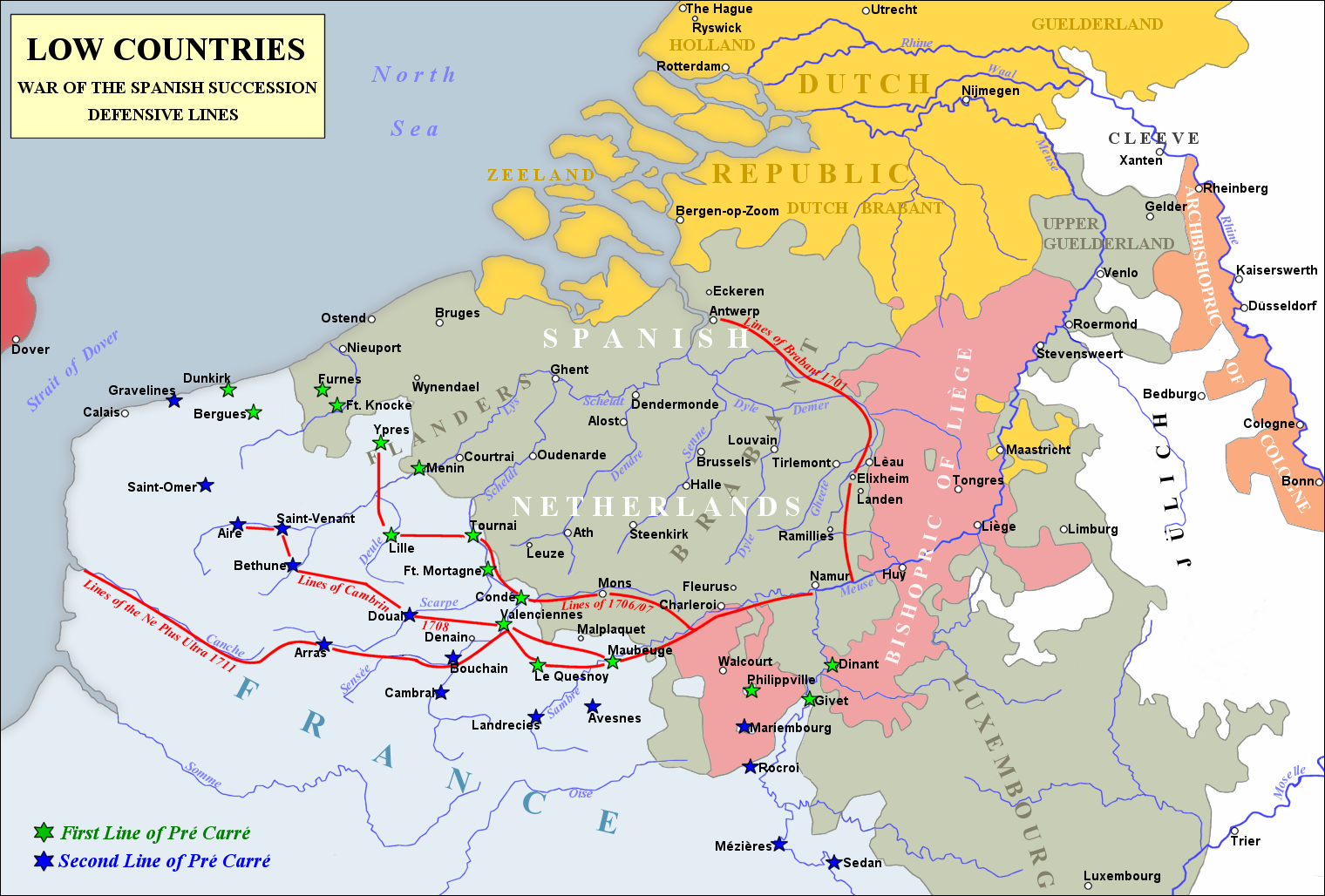
Campaign map of the Low Countries during the War of the Spanish Succession

The French suffered around 1,300 men dead or wounded in the whole operation, while the Dutch lost 8 men killed and 44 wounded. Vauban wrote a letter to Minister Michel Chamillart on 1 September, in which he lamented the inadequate strength of Bedmar's forces, which comprised only 15 battalions initially, later rising to 20, each averaging only 400 men. His primary concern, however, was Hulst's geography. He noted that while the town itself was not particularly strong, its strategic position made it formidable. The Dutch controlled access by sea, preventing any French naval support. Overland approaches were limited: the route via St. Jansteen led directly to the fortress, making it unsuitable for siege works, while the only viable route, the Kijkuit dike, was just eight feet wide and heavily fortified.

Vauban described the daunting defenses—two main forts supported by three additional strongpoints, all protected by deep, water-filled moats and a large creek acting as an extra barrier. The narrow and marshy terrain left the French with no effective means of attack. He warned that even if the French had completely surrounded Hulst, the Dutch could still reinforce the town via the open sea. His bleak assessment ultimately led to the decision to abandon the siege.This retreat left Hulst as the only fortress to have ever successfully withstood a siege by Vauban.

The French commanders lingered for a few days in their camp at St. Gillis and discussions arose about launching an assault on Liefkenshoek, Bergen op Zoom, or Breda. Vauban, however, was firmly opposed to these plans. Which is explained in his letter to Minister Chamillart on 6 September 1702. After detailing the fortifications of Liefkenshoek, he unequivocally rejected the idea of besieging it: "Had we begun earlier in the campaign season, with ample supplies and sufficient time, I would not despair of success. But undertaking this siege now is too great a gamble—failure carries far greater risks than any potential reward. In short, I cannot recommend this course of action. The late season and the many obstacles make me reluctant, especially since we would be endangering the honour of our arms for nothing more than a hole ('un trou') unworthy of such an effort."

Vauban was equally dismissive of operations against Bergen op Zoom or Breda, stating: "I am unsure of the current state of Bergen op Zoom's fortifications, but they are unlikely to be so weak that we could hope to take them in autumn with a mere handful of men. To undertake such a siege, four things are essential: 1) large armies, 2) extensive supply depots, 3) favourable weather, and 4) naval support. All four are indispensable, and you have none of them. The same applies to Breda." At the core of Vauban's military philosophy was a fundamental rule: no fortress should be besieged unless it could be completely surrounded.

With these actions, the war in Flanders thus came to an end for the year 1702. In the final months, it was not battle but malaria that claimed the most lives. Zeeland had long been notorious for its unhealthy climate, and during the Eighty Years' War, soldiers stationed there had received higher pay as compensation. The situation was further exacerbated by widespread inundations. For foreign troops in the Dutch army, as well as the French, the toll was even greater, as they were unaccustomed to the conditions. Medical care, too, was severely lacking.

The diversion had failed to save Venlo and on 25 September, the city surrendered to the Allies. Stevensweert, Roermond and Liège soon also succumbed to the Allies during this offensive. The year had thus gone well for the Allies. But painful as the loss of these fortresses was for the French, the primary fortification lines of the Spanish Netherlands had not yet been broken.

== Sources ==
- Wijn, J.W. (1956). Het Staatsche Leger: Deel VIII Het tijdperk van de Spaanse Successieoorlog (The Dutch States Army: Part VIII The era of the War of the Spanish Succession) (in Dutch). Martinus Nijhoff.
- Van Lennep, Jacob (1880). De geschiedenis van Nederland, aan het Nederlandsche Volk verteld [The history of the Netherlands, told to the Dutch nation] (in Dutch). Leiden; z.j.
- Knoop, Willem Jan (1863). Krijgs- en geschiedkundige geschriften [Military and historical writings.] (in Dutch). J.F. Thieme.
- Lynn, John A. (1999). The Wars of Louis XIV: 1667–1714. Longman. ISBN 0-582-05629-2.
- Ostwald, Jamel (2006). Vauban under Siege: Engineering Efficiency and Martial Vigor in the War of the Spanish Succession. Brill. ISBN 978-90-47-41150-5.
