= Isidoro de la Cueva y Benavides =

Spanish noble, military officer and politician

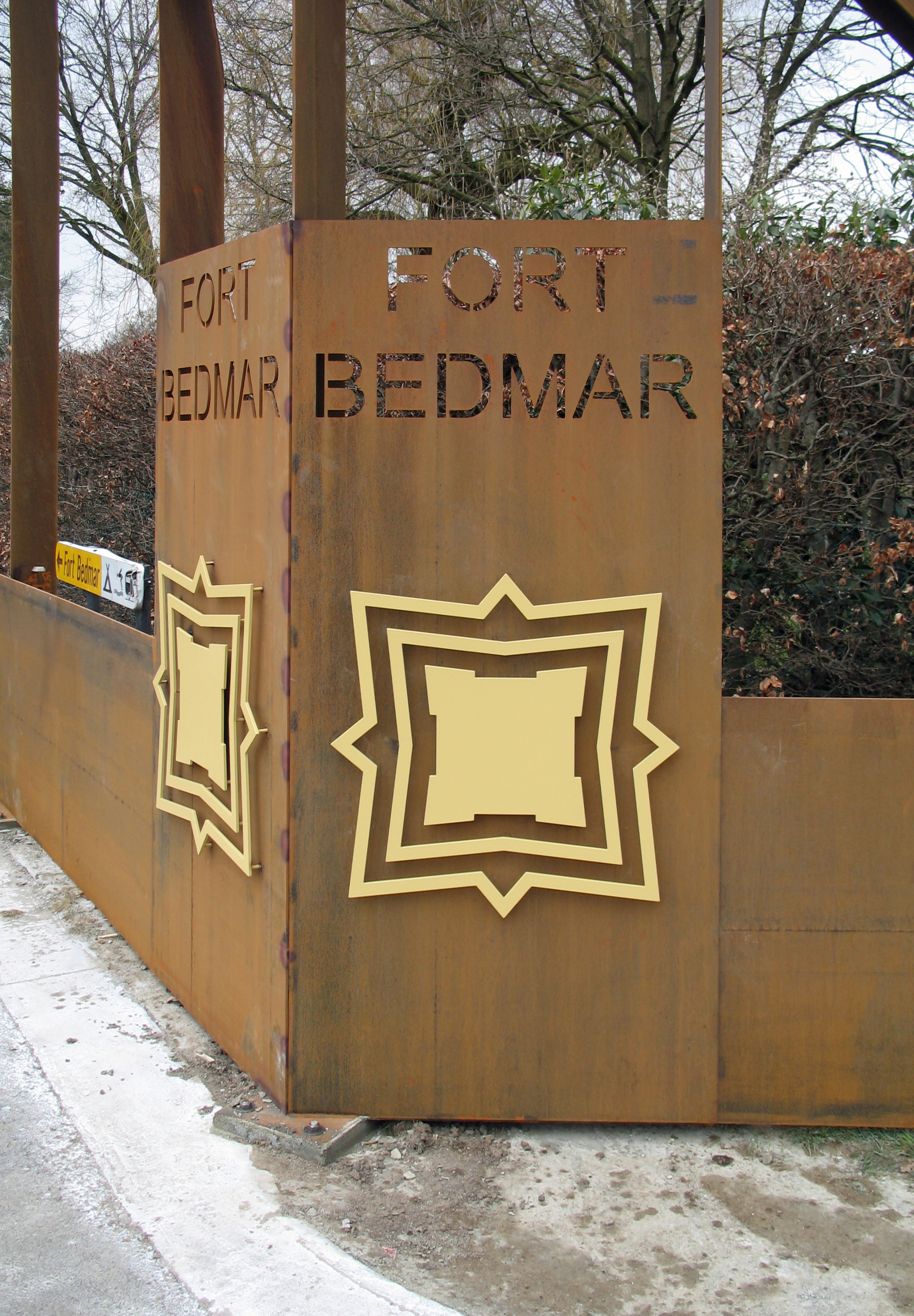
Fort Bedmar at De Klinge in Flanders

Don Isidoro de la Cueva y Benavides (Madrid, 23 May 1652 – Madrid, 2 June 1723) IV or V Marquis of Bedmar, was a Spanish noble, military and politician. He was acting Governor of the Spanish Netherlands from 1701 to 1704, Viceroy of Sicily from 1705 to 1707 and Spanish Minister of War in 1709.

== Biography ==
He was the youngest son of Gaspar de la Cueva y Mendoza, III Marquis of Bedmar and Manuela Enríquez Osorio. He became the fifth Marquis of Bedmar upon the death of his older brother Melchior in 1667.

He pursued a military career, and served in Milan, the Low Countries where he was captain general of the artillery and then in Spain.
After the outbreak of the Nine Years' War, he returned to the Low Countries, as General of the Flanders army, with the rank of Maestre de Campo. With his troops, Bedmar participated in the lost Battle of Fleurus (1690) and Battle of Neerwinden (1693). After the war ended in 1697, Bedmar was appointed as supreme commander in the Spanish Netherlands.

Isidro Melchor de la Cueva-Benavides y Enriquez around 1700

In 1701, the War of the Spanish Succession broke out, and the Governor of the Spanish Netherlands, Maximilian of Bavaria left to fight the Austrians and English in Germany. He appointed Bedmar as acting Governor and ordered him to reinforce the defenses against the Dutch, English and Austrians. He constructed the Bedmar Line, including Fort Bedmar at De Klinge. He was not able to prevent Menno van Coehoorn from taking the fortress of Saint Donas, and in August 1702 he failed to conquer Hulst, and in 1703 he fought the Battle of Ekeren against the Dutch.

Suffering from poor health, he left the Southern Netherlands for Versailles in February 1705, where he received the Order of the Holy Spirit. He then became Viceroy of Sicily from 1705 until 1707. Back in Spain, he was made Minister of War to King Philip V in 1709 and was also named Captain General of the Ocean.

=== Marriage and children ===
He married María Manuela de Acuña (1666-1706), his niece, only daughter of his sister Francisca and Pedro de Acuña y Meneses, Marqués de Assentar, with whom he had two daughters:

- María Francisca de la Cueva y Acuña, V or VI Marquise of Bedmar, married Marciano Fernández Pacheco.
- Maria Teresa de la Cueva y Acuna.

He then married Francisca Henríquez de Velasco, with whom he had no children.

== Sources ==
- Spanish Succession
- Real Academia de la Historia
- Geni
