= Capture of Liège (1702) =

1702 siege of the War of the Spanish Succession

- Part of the War of the Spanish Succession
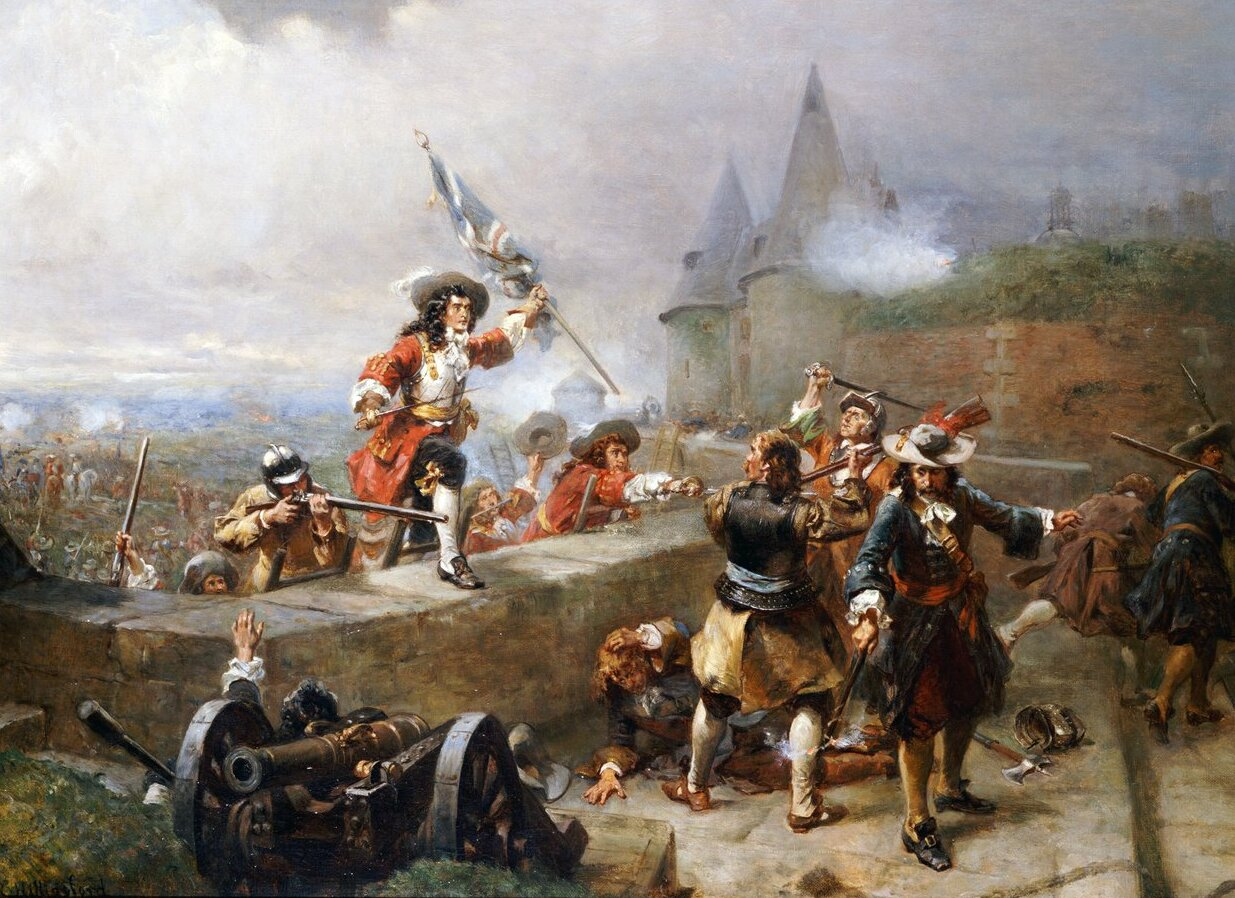
- Painting of English troops storming the citadel of Liège on 23 October 1702
Date	13 October – 31 October 1702
Location	Liège
Result	Anglo-Dutch victory

Belligerents
Dutch Republic; England	France; Bourbon Spain; Liège; Cologne

Commanders and leaders
(Kingdom of England) Marlborough; (Dutch Republic) Athlone; (Dutch Republic) Coehoorn	Violaine; Millon

Strength
23,000	7,200

Casualties and losses
1,034 killed and wounded	5,700 killed, captured or deserted

The capture of Liège took place between 13 and 31 October of 1702 during the War of the Spanish Succession. It formed part of the Grand Alliance's campaign to secure the Dutch borders and capture the Meuse valley. Anglo-Dutch forces under the Duke of Marlborough and Earl of Athlone occupied the city without resistance on 15 October, but the Citadel of Liège and the Chartreuse fort continued to be held by Bourbon troops from France, Spain, the Bishopric of Liège, and the Electorate of Cologne.

After a week of intense bombardment and assaults directed by the Dutch engineer Menno van Coehoorn, the citadel capitulated on 23 October, followed by the surrender of the Chartreuse on 31 October. The victory resulted in the capture of several thousand French troops and laid the groundwork for further Allied operations along the Meuse and the Rhine.

== Background ==
In May of 1702, the Dutch Republic, England, and the Holy Roman Empire declared war on France, thereby starting the War of the Spanish Succession. In accordance with the Treaty of Ryswick, Dutch troops occupied several barrier fortresses in the Spanish Netherlands, which served as the Dutch Republic's first line of defence. (Note: These fortress cities were Ath, Mons, Kortrijk, Charleroi, Namur, Nieuwpoort, Oudenaarde and Luxembourg) However, in February 1701 a French surprise attack, carried out with the assistance of Maximilian II Emanuel, Elector of Bavaria and governor of the Spanish Netherlands, had replaced these garrisons with French troops. French troops took up positions in the Spanish Netherlands and the Rhineland with help from Joseph Clemens of Bavaria, who was the Elector of Cologne and Prince-bishop of Liège. These moves directly threatened the Dutch border. The situation was reminiscent of the Rampjaar of 1672, the opening year of the Franco-Dutch War. (Note: Despite Dutch fears the French historian Clément Oury notes that, based on the correspondence between Versailles and the Army of Flanders in early 1702, there was no French plan to invade the Dutch Republic. The fortresses to be taken were too formidable, the supply bases too distant, and Louis XIV's army too recently remobilised. French objectives were therefore limited to holding existing positions and securing a few key fortresses, while the main strategic priority lay in Italy, where a counter-offensive in Lombardy was planned to defend the Spanish crown's territories.)

These moves by France effectively dismantled the line of fortresses on which Dutch security relied, stripping away its first line of defence. The French, on the other hand, had as their second line the great fortresses within the French frontier, and thus enjoyed both their own defences and those which had belonged to their opponents. In addition, they had constructed the formidable Lines of Brabant, a continuous seventy-mile (110 km) defensive system from Antwerp to Namur, designed under the Marquis of Vauban, allowing their field armies to confront any Allied advance. Only a handful of strong fortresses remained under Dutch control, such as Bergen op Zoom, Nijmegen and Maastricht. Maastricht, a powerful fortress on the Meuse, lying within a Dutch enclave, had escaped both the French seizure of the Spanish Netherlands and the defection of the prince-bishop of Cologne and Liège. It was a fortress of the first order, with modern defences, a historic reputation, ample supplies, and a garrison of some 14,000 men; however, it was strategically isolated, cut off by the French-garrisoned towns of Venlo, Roermond, and Stevensweert.

Stadtholder-King William III of Orange, who had been the main commander of the Grand Alliance forces in previous conflicts, had died in March, and his death was viewed as a disaster. No one possessed the prestige to fill his place. While the Anglo-Dutch political leadership debated whom to appoint as his successor, a Dutch-Imperial army under the Prince of Nassau-Usingen captured Kaiserswerth on 15 June, securing the eastern flank of the Dutch Republic. The Duke of Boufflers' French army, to save Kaiserwerth, had pursued an Anglo-Dutch covering force under the Godard van Reede-Ginkel, Earl of Athlone, all the way to the gates of Nijmegen. Though he failed to save Kaiserswerth or bring Athlone's force to battle, Boufflers had almost taken Nijmegen, one of the last Dutch strongholds.

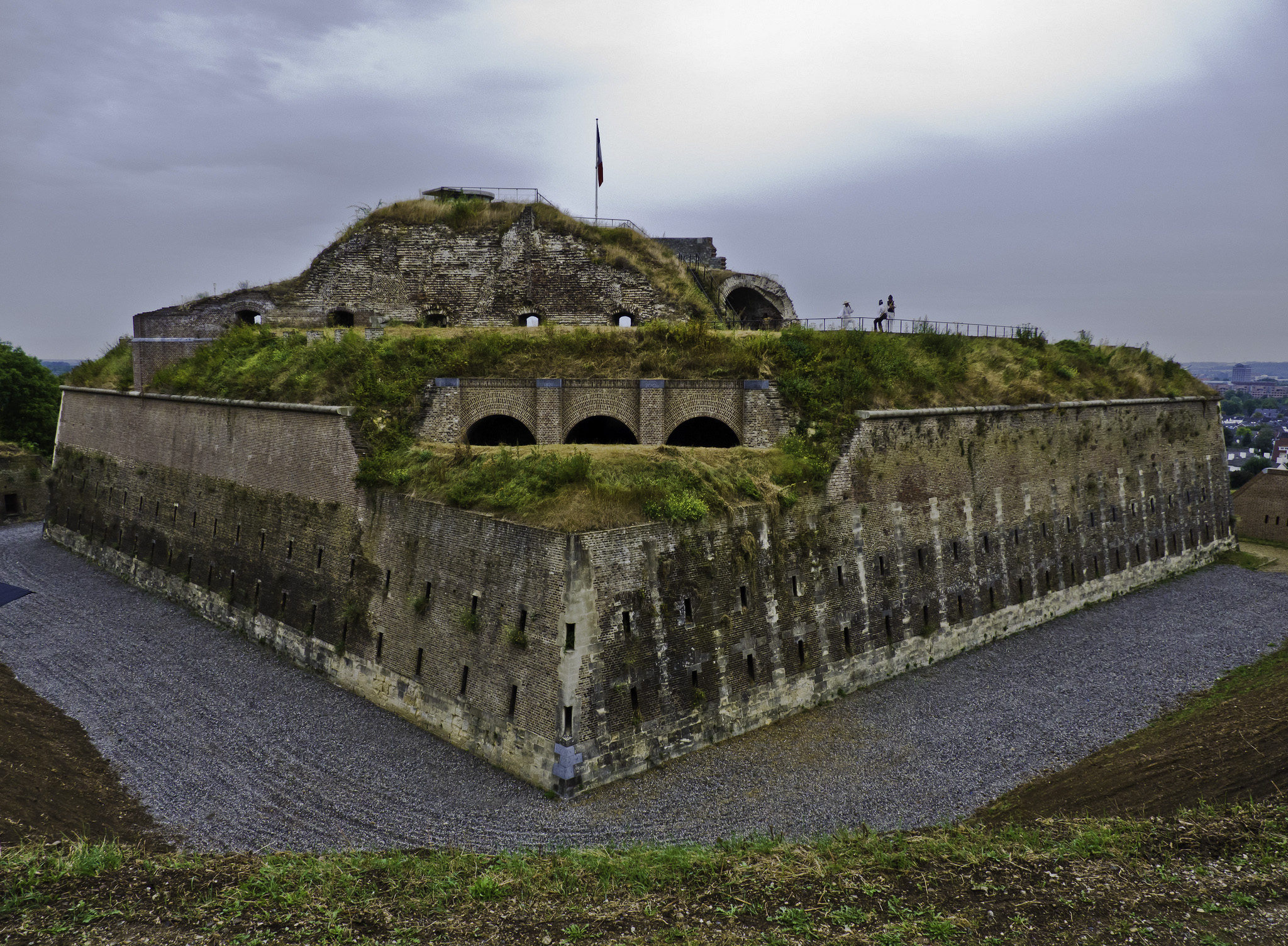
Fortress Sint Pieter in Maastricht, completed just before the war began. Establishing a secure link to this isolated city was a key objective for the Grand Alliance.

The close call at Nijmegen had caused significant unrest among the Dutch regenten (regents), and they were now determined to take decisive action. In response, they resolved to raise a substantial field army and to make a final decision on who would command the combined Anglo-Dutch forces. During a conference on 25 June, it was decided to appoint John Churchill, Earl of Marlborough as commander-in-chief. While he had limited military experience, the confidence that William III had previously placed in him, along with the strategic belief that his appointment would further solidify England's commitment to the war on the continent, ultimately outweighed other considerations.

The Prince of Nassau-Usingen refused to serve under Marlborough, while Athlone, encouraged by the other Dutch generals, made efforts to secure an equivalent position to Marlborough. Athlone was an experienced commander, famous for his victories in Ireland during the Nine Years' War, and the regenten agreed with Athlone that Marlborough was a lightweight compared to him. Although Athlone officially remained subordinate, the Dutch States General strongly limited Marlborough's power over the army. Marlborough could only command Dutch troops who were part of the combined field army and had to coordinate all his plans with Athlone. In cases of disagreement, Marlborough could not push through his plan; instead, the Dutch field deputies had to make the final decision.

== Prelude ==
=== The unfought battles of Peer and Helchteren ===
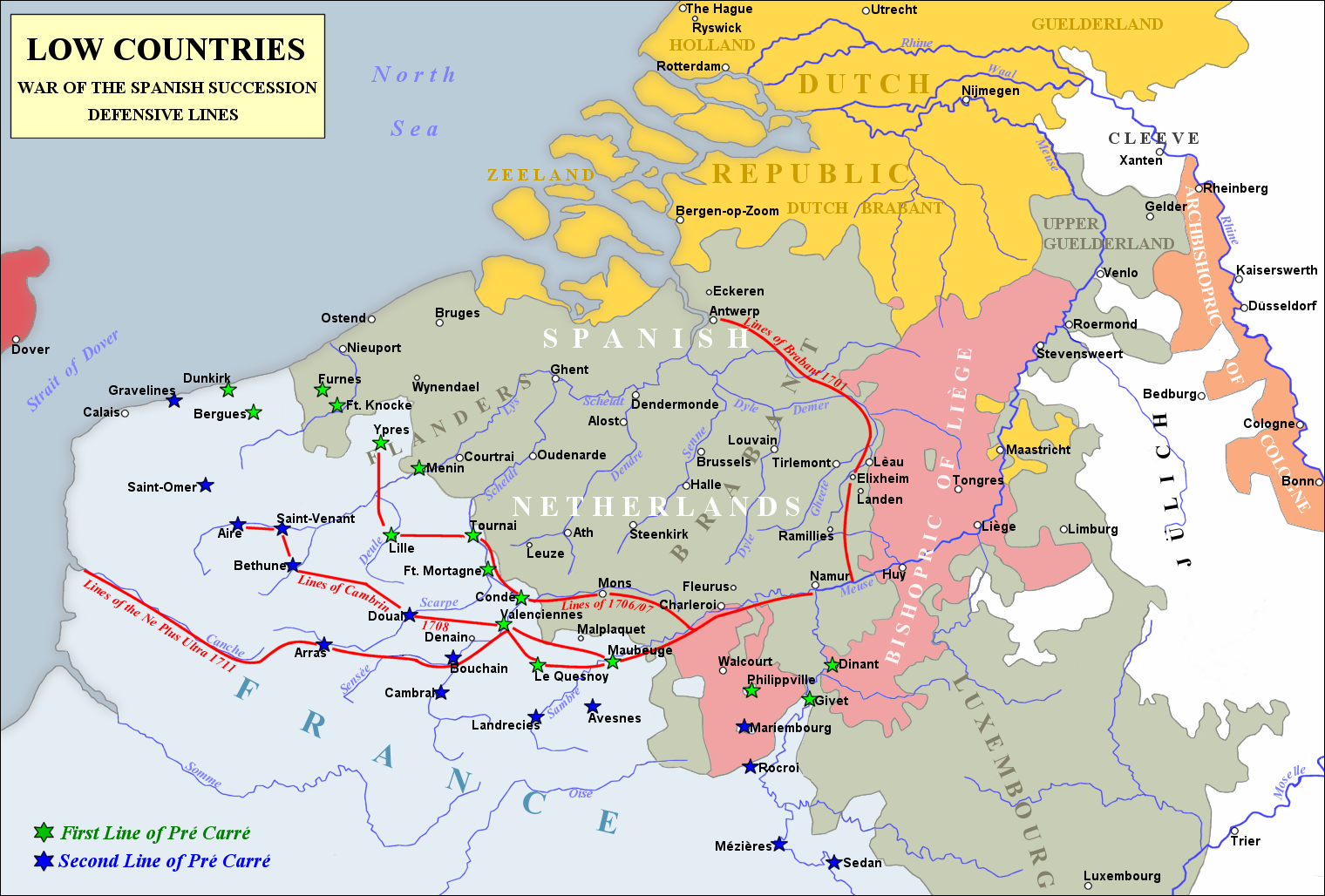
Campaign map of the Low Countries during the War of the Spanish Succession.

The focus of the campaign shifted westward. With a field army of 68,000 men under their command, Marlborough and Athlone aimed to re-establish the Dutch connection to Maastricht by capturing Venlo, Roermond and Stevensweert. If the Allies could supply Maastricht it might serve as a springboard for the invasion of the Spanish Netherlands. On 24 July the Anglo-Dutch forces crossed the Meuse, threatening Boufflers' supply lines and forcing him to retreat towards Venlo. Marlborough saw an opportunity to bring Boufflers' smaller army to battle near Peer, but Athlone, mindful of the Dutch Republic's precarious strategic situation, refused to take the risk. As a result, Boufflers was able to withdraw. He discarded much of his baggage, which greatly increased his mobility, and received reinforcements that enabled him to attempt to push the Grand Alliance forces back across the Meuse.

On 9 August, the French positioned themselves northwest of Marlborough's army, near Balen, from where they threatened the Grand Alliance supply lines and the southern Dutch cities of Den Bosch and Breda. The supply situation in the Anglo-Dutch camp deteriorated rapidly and only improved when the Earl of Albemarle arrived with a large convoy on 19 August, enabling the Grand Alliance to move again. Three days later they advanced towards Boufflers, and on 23 August, the two armies deployed in battle order opposite each other on the Heath of Helchteren. For two days, the armies stared each other down, trading cannon fire that produced several hundred casualties, before Boufflers slipped away in the night of the 25th. To many in the Anglo-Dutch army, the episode felt like a missed chance to bring the French to battle. (Note: British writers have traditionally blamed the Dutch for the failure to engage. On the 23rd, Obdam's division is accused of having advanced too slowly, forcing Marlborough to hold back, and the next day it was, according to Winston Churchill and David G. Chandler, supposedly the Dutch field deputies who vetoed an attack. Yet, as Jan Willem Wijn points out, there is no evidence that Marlborough had ordered a general advance on the 23rd, and on the 24th, none of the Dutch deputies were present with the army, making their involvement impossible. The matter, therefore, remains unclear.)

=== The conquest of Venlo, Roermond and Stevensweert ===
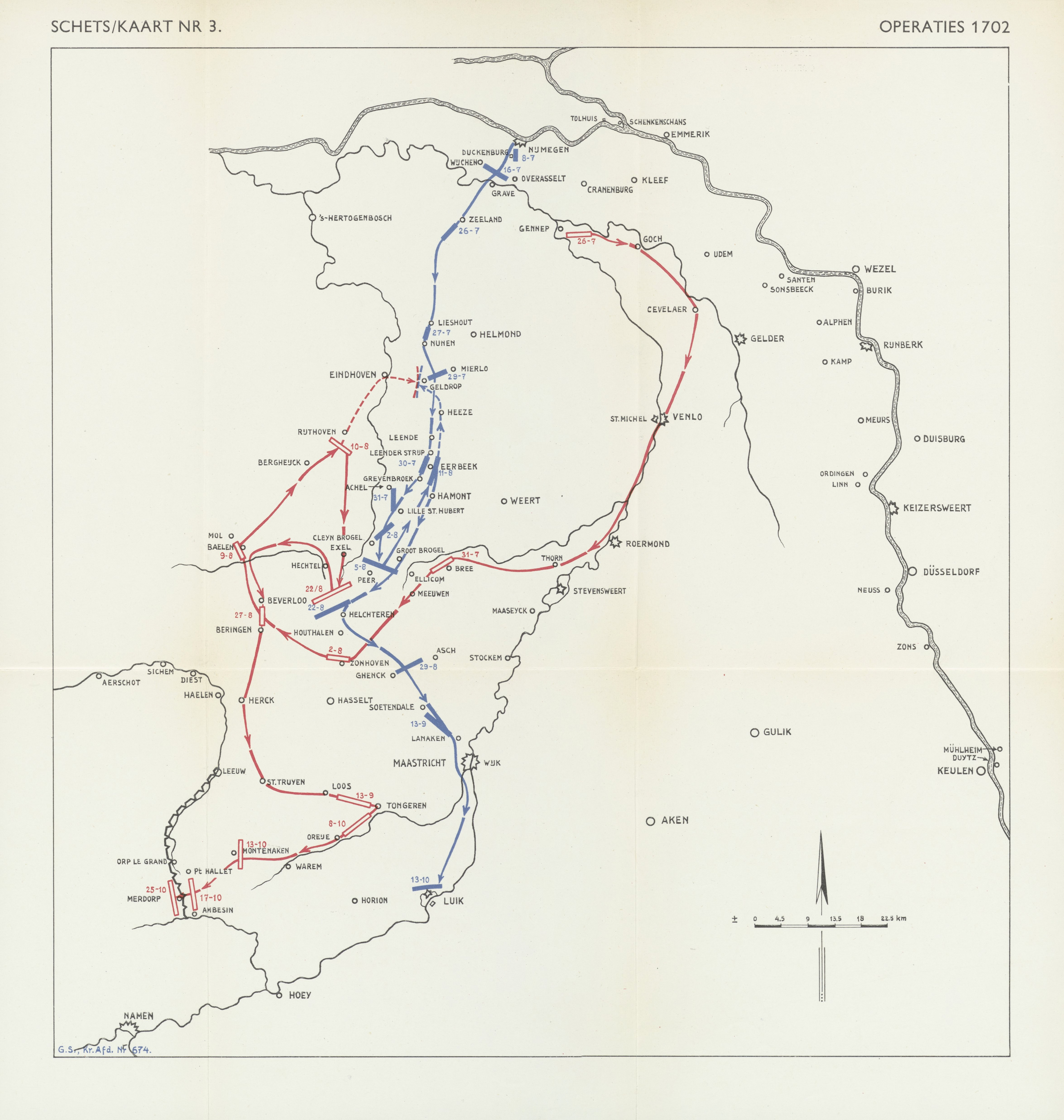
Map showing the movements of the main Allied and Bourbon armies during the Meuse campaign. The Allies in blue and the Bourbons in red.

With the French army in retreat, it became possible to invest Venlo on 11 September, the first city on the Meuse on the way to Maastricht. The Prince of Nassau-Usingen, who until then had refused to take part in the campaign, led the 25,000 men conducting the siege, while Marlborough and Athlone covered it with 45,000 men. After twelve days, the city surrendered. A French attempt to divert Allied troops away from Venlo by attacking Hulst failed. Stevensweert and Roermond were next. As both were considered weak, the Allies decided to besiege them simultaneously. Stevensweert capitulated on 2 October and Roermond five days later.

With these victories, the vital connection with Maastricht was reestablished, yet Marlborough remained dissatisfied with the campaign's results. He argued that the Allies needed to capture Liège to secure Maastricht fully and open the way for an attack on Huy and Namur in 1703. Liège, one of the wealthiest cities in Europe with a large population of 50,000 and the capital of the Bishopric of Liège, was a prize Louis XIV did not want to lose, and he ordered Boufflers to protect it. However, the terrain around Liège made this difficult, and positioning his army in front of the city would expose the weak fortresses in Brabant to an Allied incursion. Seeing no viable way to defend Liège, Boufflers withdrew behind the lines of Brabant, and on 13 October the Allied army arrived before the city. (Note: Some historians, including William Coxe, Winston Churchill and James Falkner, have argued that the Dutch again prevented Marlborough from bringing the French to battle on 13 October. Wijn again rejects this interpretation, noting that no contemporary documents mention such a decision or a council of war. He concludes that, "if we consider the route of the Allied army, which crossed the Jeker near Fort Saint Peter and marched directly towards Liège between that stream and the Meuse, together with the French position and Boufflers's intentions, it cannot be assumed that there was even the slightest chance of a battle that day." Boufflers had already begun withdrawing before the Allied army came into contact with the French and since commanders of the period could rarely force an unwilling opponent to fight, Boufflers could easily avoid a general engagement.)

=== Surrender of Liège ===
Liège was an open city without strong fortifications, and the city council of Liège was unwilling to sacrifice the city for France, or even for their own sovereign, Joseph Clemens of Bavaria. (Note: 18th century historian De Vryer remarks: "This city, counted among the largest and most important places in Europe, lies about four hours south of Maastricht on the river Meuse, in a very pleasant valley surrounded by several hills. It is hardly possible to say on which side of the Meuse Liège ought to be placed, since the river forms such a remarkable bend around the city that, besides many small islands, it is nearly cut in half by it. Within this place, unusually populous and flourishing through its trade with Holland, one counts more than a hundred churches and a renowned college. But the inhabitants, formerly well known for their bravery in defending their privileges against the encroachments of the Bishop, now concern themselves little with whom they stand under in times of war, and generally surrender to the first enemy who appears before their walls. They are, however, somewhat compelled to do so, both to secure their merchandise and because the city walls, not strengthened according to modern fortification science, do not permit a long defence.") The mayor succeeded in concluding a favourable convention with the Allies on the evening of 13 October, allowing them entry into the city while obliging them not to attack the French occupied Citadel of Liège from within the city. When it came time to sign, Marlborough refused Athlone's signature, leaving only the Dutch deputies to represent the Dutch Republic. (Note: The Lord of Geldermalsen, one of the Dutch Deputies, wrote on 14 October: "It is impossible to express with what contempt he [Marlborough] judges Count Athlone – his indecision, his weakness, his willingness to confide in the most insignificant people and follow their advice despite all previous orders.") Athlone lodged a formal complaint with the States General, but no decision followed. Four days later, on 17 October, Nassau-Usingen died, and on the 19th, Athlone was promoted to Field Marshal of the Dutch States Army. The advancement gave him personal satisfaction, but it left the underlying issue between the Allied leaders untouched.

On the 15th, three Dutch and three English battalions entered the city, and the Allies began preparing for the siege of the citadel and the Chartreuse fortress, a detached stronghold of considerable strength. Menno van Coehoorn, the renowned Dutch engineer-general who had directed the sieges of Venlo and Roermond, was tasked with the technical command. It was decided to begin with the citadel. This was an irregular pentagon, with bastions, dry ditches, ravelins, and a covered way. Its main rampart was reinforced with stonework, while the other works were not, though they had been made storm-proof with palisades and cheval de frise. The garrison consisted of seven and a half battalions under Violaine, while Millon commanded five battalions in the Chartreuse, together about 7,200 troops. The Anglo-Dutch siege force numbered 23,000 men.

== The sieges ==
=== Capture of the Citadel of Liège ===
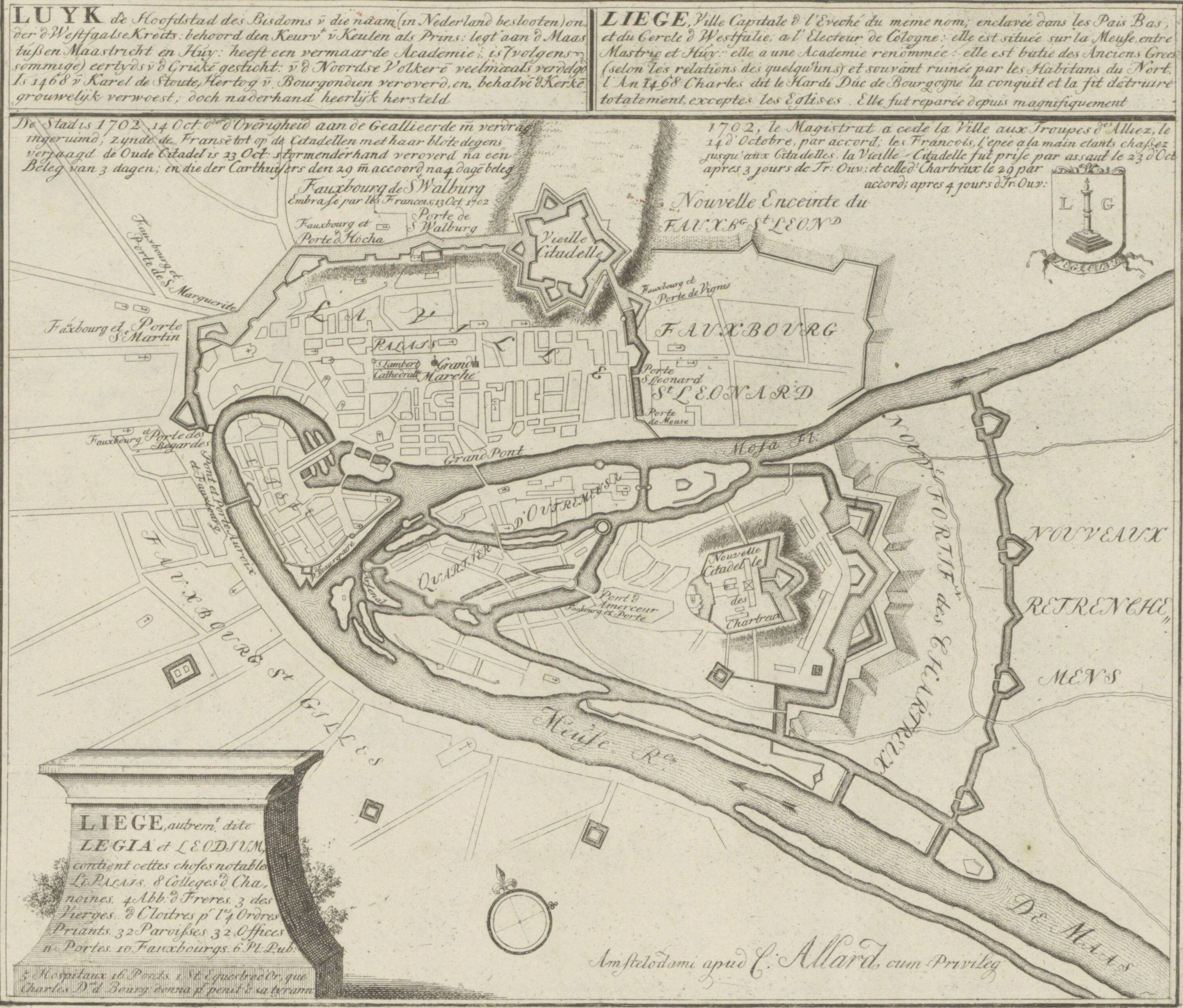
Map of Liège in 1702.

At nine in the morning on 20 October, the Dutch artillery opened fire. The English contingent had no siege guns. By evening, two parallel attack trenches were begun, each worked by 500 sappers under the protection of four infantry battalions. The next night, they were deepened and widened, almost ready to serve as launching positions for the assault. Mortar bombardment began that evening as well and would continue until the citadel's surrender. During the preparations, Coehoorn had clashed with one of the Dutch deputies, who had ordered the guns to fire without his approval, and he threatened to abandon the siege until Athlone and others persuaded him to stay. (Note: During the preparations, tensions arose between Menno van Coehoorn and Adriaan van Borsele van der Hooge, Lord of Geldermalsen, one of the Dutch field deputies. Coehoorn accused Geldermalsen of deliberately withholding projectiles and threatened to leave the field army unless the issue was resolved. Although the matter was addressed, Geldermalsen later ordered the batteries to open fire without Coehoorn's consent. According to an account recorded years later by Coehoorn's son, the engineer confronted him, asking: "Have you presumed to give Lieutenant-Colonel IJssel the order to fire?" Geldermalsen replied, "Yes, but do you know to whom you are speaking?" Coehoorn retorted, "I know very well, I am speaking to the Lord of Geldermalsen, Deputy in the field. But do you know to whom you are speaking?" When Geldermalsen answered no, Coehoorn declared: "Yes indeed, you are speaking to General Coehoorn, who at any moment can become what you are, while you can never, ever become what I am." Only the intervention of the other deputies and Athlone calmed the situation and kept Coehoorn from abandoning the siege.)

The effect of the bombardment soon became apparent when two ammunition magazines caught fire and exploded, while work on the trenches steadily progressed. Among the generals commanding operations in the trenches were, on the 21st, the Hereditary Prince of Hesse-Kassel, then a lieutenant general in Dutch service and later King of Sweden; on the 22nd, Major General Prince George of Hanover, the future King of Great Britain; alongside Danish General Jobst von Scholten, who would later distinguish himself at Ramillies. By the 23rd, the fort was considered ready for storming: the palisades had been destroyed, a sufficient breach had been made in the main wall, and much of the artillery had been silenced. Marlborough demanded the citadel's surrender, but the governor defiantly replied that he would not even think of such a thing for another six weeks. At a quarter to four, the signal for the assault was given, which was carried out with great resolve under a heavy fire from 72 cannons, 50 howitzers and mortars, and 250 hand mortars.

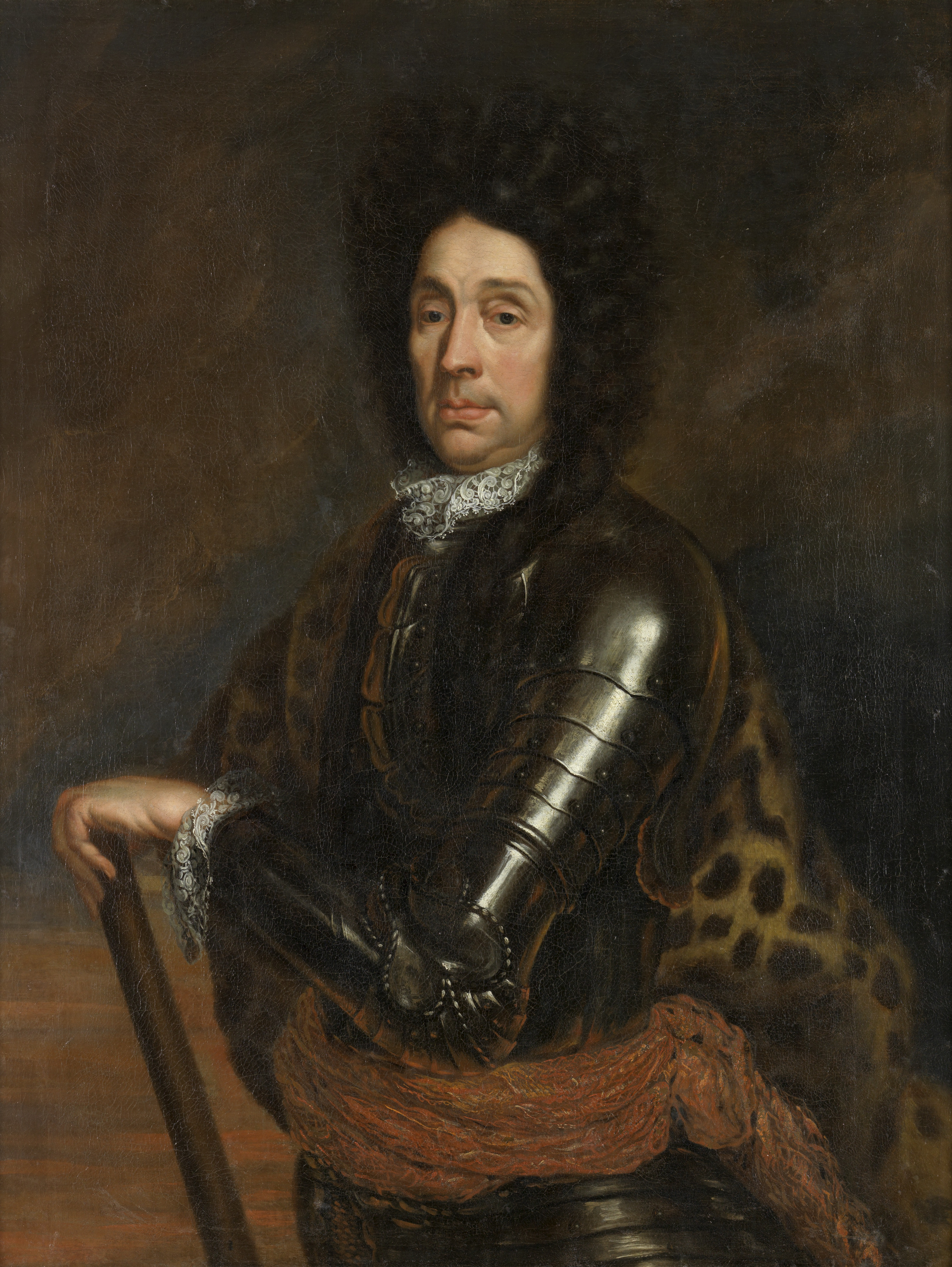
Portrait of Menno van Coehoorn.

Lieutenant-Generals François Nicolas Fagel and Carl Christian von Sommerfeldt commanded the attack on the Dutch and English sides respectively. The covered way was quickly taken, during which the governor, Violaine, was captured. Without pause, the assault pressed on to the main wall; together with the fleeing defenders, the attackers broke into the citadel. In the heat of the fighting, many defenders were cut down, as the Anglo-Dutch troops initially gave no quarter. Some defenders managed to escape, but 2,100 men were eventually taken prisoner. The Dutch, under Fagel, lost 41 men killed and 255 wounded, while Sommerfeldt's command suffered 154 dead and 385 wounded, of whom 83 and 171 were English respectively.

=== Capture of the Chartreuse ===
Immediately following the fall of the citadel, preparations began for the assault on the Chartreuse. Command of the forces assigned to the siege was given to Hesse-Kassel. By 24 October, the fortress was encircled by four squadrons, with approximately forty infantry battalions joining the following day. Stormy weather over the next few days delayed operations, rendering the pontoon bridge over the Meuse unusable and preventing the artillery from being brought forward. Despite these difficulties, the trenches were opened on 27 October, and by 10 a.m. on the 29th, the mortars began firing. The bombardment soon set the buildings inside the fort alight, and by mid-afternoon the cannons were also in position, though further fire was scarcely necessary.

The raising of white flags and the sounding of the chamade soon signalled the end of resistance. Terms of capitulation were quickly agreed and signed that evening, with Marlborough and the Dutch field deputies representing the Allies. Governor de Millon had followed his orders to avoid exposing the garrison to assault, and unlike the citadel, the five battalions stationed at the Chartreuse largely survived. On 31 October the garrison of the Chartreuse, numbering around 1,500 men excluding 400 Swiss troops and seven Liège companies who left French service, marched to Antwerp with the army. The citadel garrison was sent to Maastricht and remained prisoners of war. In total, 5,700 men of the defenders were killed, captured or had deserted. The Allies lost 1,034 men during the sieges.

== Aftermath ==
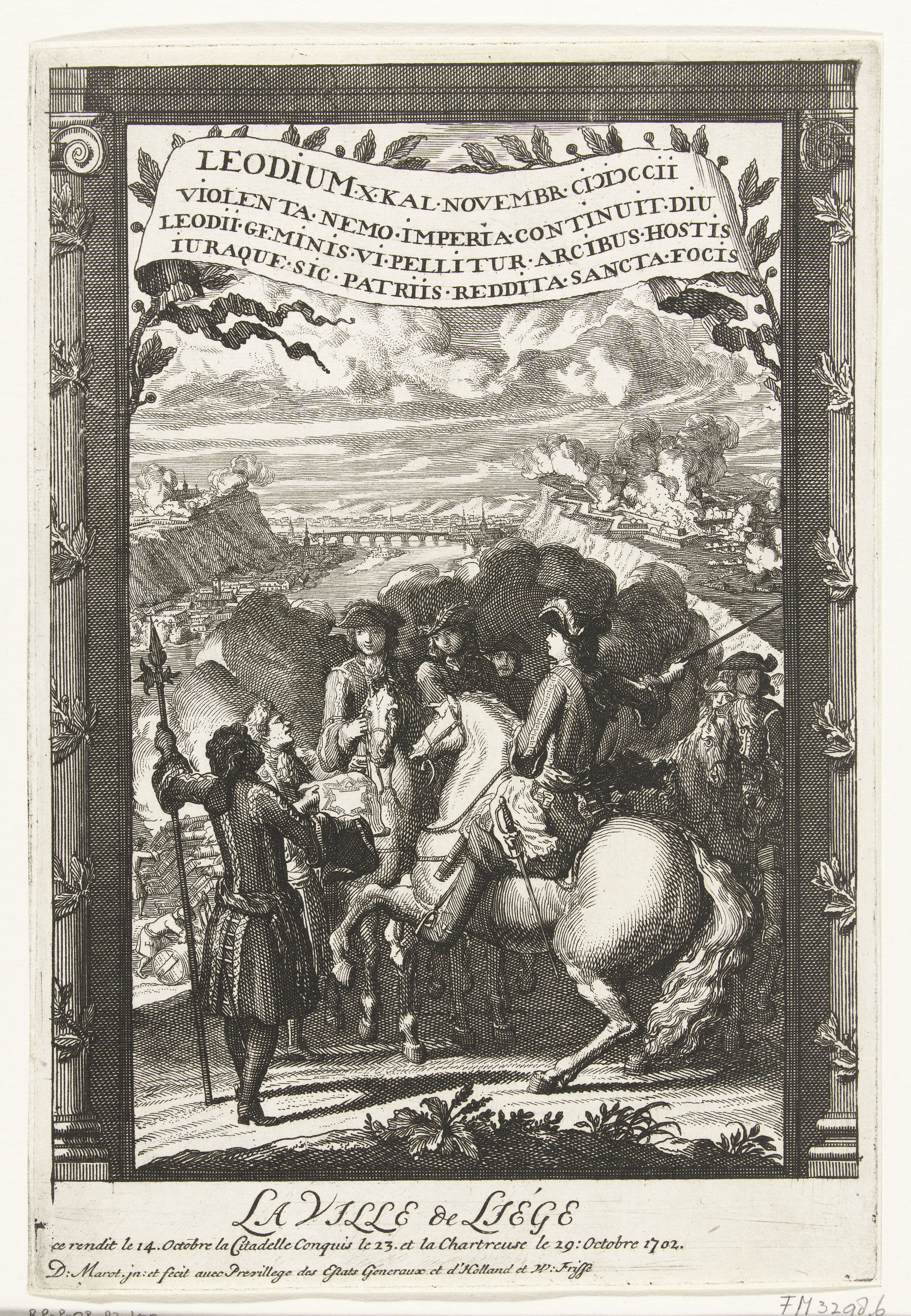
Contemporary illustration of the conquest of Liège.

The advances of the Allies in 1702 were significant. The connection to Maastricht was re-established, and the French were expelled from much of the Meuse and Lower Rhine. A wedge was driven between the positions of the French in the Spanish Netherlands and the Archbishopric of Cologne, while a large part of the Bishopric of Liège returned to Allied control. The Elector of Cologne, a French ally, was left without an army, and much of his revenue. Allied forces garrisoned Kaiserswerth, Venlo, Roermond, Stevensweert, Maastricht, and Liège. Additionally, Marlborough also arranged the winter siege of Rheinberg, which capitulated in February 1703, ensuring that the next campaign could begin under favourable conditions.

The French commander, Boufflers, withdrew his forces behind the defensive Lines of Brabant, protecting the heart of the Southern Netherlands, repositioning between Wasseiges and Petit Hallet. He strengthened several fortresses, including Huy, Limbourg, and Zoutleeuw, but their safety ultimately depended more on the onset of winter than on their defences. To compensate for his numerical inferiority, Boufflers recalled the Duke of Tallard's forces from Bonn, while diversions were attempted along the Moselle and Rhine. The Allies briefly considered besieging Bonn in the winter, but the plan was discarded and its siege wouldn't start until May of next year. A Prussian corps did appear before Rheinberg, but after an ineffective bombardment abandoned its siege, maintaining only a blockade until February.

The year had thus gone well for the Allies: from an Anglo-Dutch army being on the defensive at Nijmegen to Allied dominance across a significant part of the Spanish Netherlands, all achieved without a major pitched battle. Yet Marlborough himself remained dissatisfied, believing that he had been denied the decisive field engagements necessary to bring the war to a swift conclusion. However painful the loss of these fortresses was for the French, the primary fortification lines of the Spanish Netherlands had not yet been broken.

Though often depicted as overly cautious, the Dutch were guided by strategic prudence. Unlike Marlborough, they were defending their own homeland: England, shielded by the sea, faced no direct threat, whereas the Republic would bear the full weight of any major defeat. Marlborough, on the other hand, needed swift victories to convince the Parliament of England that the costly deployment of English troops on the Continent was justified. The campaign turned out to be Athlone's last. A distinguished soldier, he suffered a fatal stroke in February 1703. His partnership with Marlborough had often been difficult, but he was eventually succeeded by Hendrik van Nassau-Ouwerkerk, a Dutch general with whom Marlborough worked more easily.

== Sources ==
- Atkinson, Cristopher Thomas (1921). Marlborough and the rise of the British Army. G. P. Putnam's Sons.
- Bosscha, Johannes (1838). Neêrlands heldendaden te land, van de vroegste tijden af tot in onze dagen [Dutch' deeds of heroism on land, from the earliest times to the present day] (in Dutch). Suringar.
- Chandler, David (2000). Marlborough as military commander. Hippocrene Books. ISBN 978-0-88254-366-6.
- Churchill, Winston (1936). Marlborough: His Life and Times. George G. Harrap Co. Ltd London.
- Falkner, James (2007). Marlborough's sieges. Spellmount. ISBN 9781862273405.
- Lynn, John Albert (1999). The Wars of Louis XIV: 1667–1714. Longman. ISBN 0-582-05629-2.
- Nimwegen, Olaf van (2020). De Veertigjarige Oorlog 1672–1712 [The Forty Years War 1672-1712: the Dutch struggle against the Sun King] (in Dutch). Prometheus. ISBN 978-90-446-3871-4.
  - Nimwegen, Olaf van (1995). De subsistentie van het leger: Logistiek en strategie van het Geallieerde en met name het Staatse leger tijdens de Spaanse Successieoorlog in de Nederlanden en het Heilige Roomse Rijk (1701-1712) [The subsistence of the Allied and especially the Dutch army during the War of the Spanish Succession] (Thesis) (in Dutch). Universiteit Utrecht.
- Österreichisch-Ungarische Monarchie. Kriegsarchiv (1877). Feldzüge des Prinzen Eugen von Savoyen (in German). Vol. 4. Wien: Verlag des K.K. Generalstabes.
- Ostwald, Jamel (2006). Vauban under Siege: Engineering Efficiency and Martial Vigor in the War of the Spanish Succession. Brill. ISBN 978-90-47-41150-5.
- Oury, Clément (2022). Le Duc de Marlborough: John Churchill, le plus redoutable ennemi de Louis XIV [The Duke of Marlborough: John Churchill, Louis XIV's Most Formidable Enemy] (in French). Perrin. ISBN 978-2262086145.
- Vryer, Abraham de (1738). Histori van Joan Churchill, hertog van Marlborough en prins van Mindelheim (in Dutch). Loveringh en De Jonge.
- Wijn, Jan Willem (1956). Het Staatsche Leger: Deel VIII-1 Het tijdperk van de Spaanse Successieoorlog 1702–1705 [The Dutch States Army: Part VIII-1 The era of the War of the Spanish Succession 1702–1705] (in Dutch). Martinus Nijhoff.
