= Siege of Venlo (1702) =

Military siege by the Grand alliance against French troops

- Part of the War of the Spanish Succession
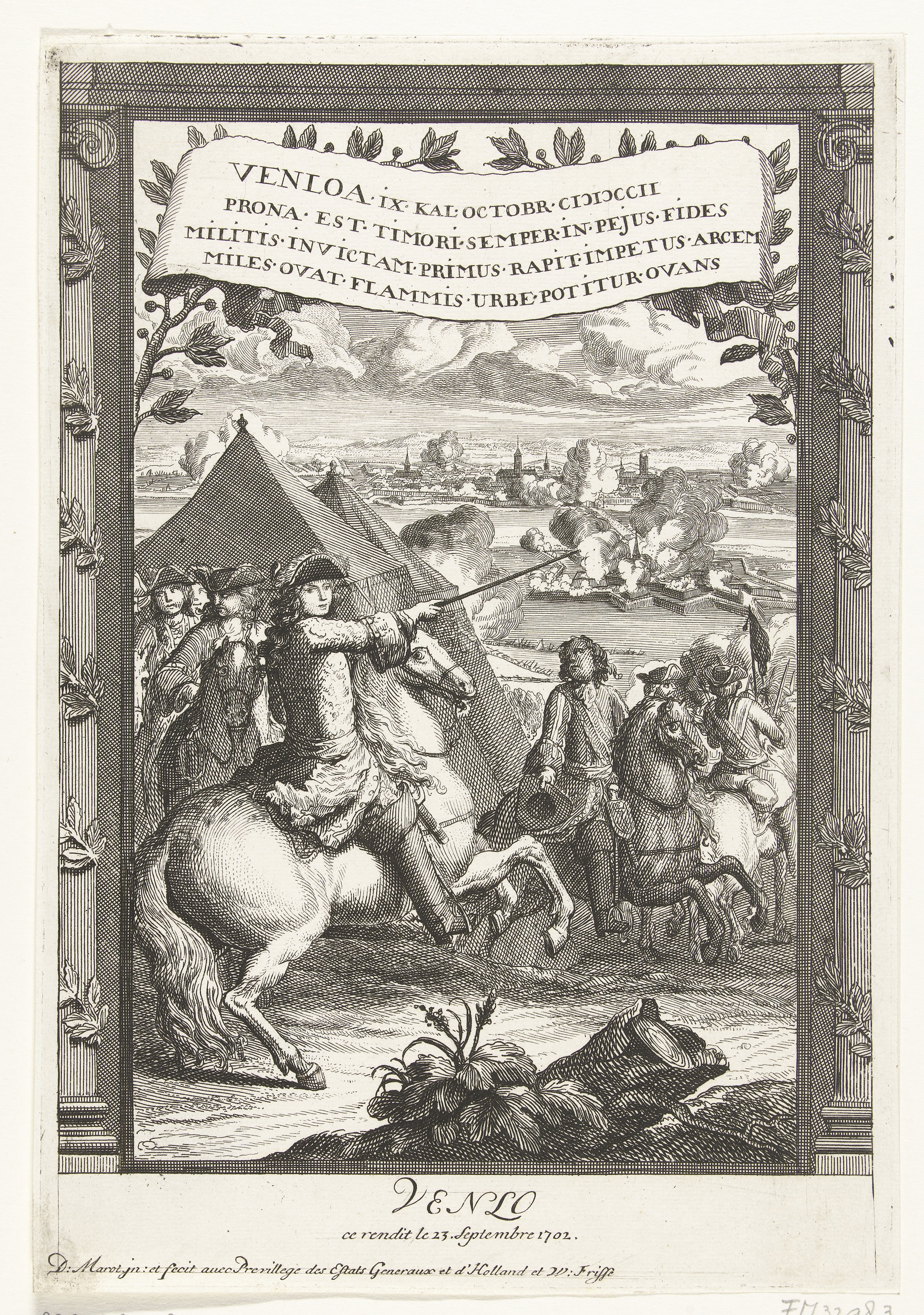
- Depiction of the 1702 siege of Venlo by Daniël Marot
Date	11–23 September 1702; 12 days
Location	Venlo, Spanish Netherlands
Result	Anglo-Dutch victory
Territorial changes	Venlo is ceded to the Republic after the negotiations

Belligerents
Dutch Republic; England	France; Bourbon Spain

Commanders and leaders
Besieging force (Dutch Republic) Nassau-Usingen (Dutch Republic) Coehoorn; Covering force (Kingdom of England) Marlborough (Dutch Republic) Earl of Athlone	(Spain) Count of Varo (Kingdom of France) Count de Labadie

Strength
Besieging force 25,000 men Covering force 45,000 men	2,500 men (Note: 6 battalions and 2 squadrons)

Casualties and losses
1,100	839

The siege of Venlo was a 12-day siege of the city of Venlo commenced by the Grand Alliance which saw the city being taken after being occupied by French troops the year before. The siege of Venlo in 1702 was one of many sieges that Venlo had endured throughout its history.

== Background ==
The Spanish king, Charles II died in 1700 without an heir to his throne. Ever since Charles' death, there had been disputes about his succession. The two main claimants to his throne were Philip of Anjou. And Charles VI of the house of Habsburg. These tensions of who was to succeed Charles II escalated into a full-scale war between Spain loyal to Philip of Anjou backed by France and its allies. And Spain loyal to Charles VI backed by the Grand Alliance.

The War of the Spanish Succession had commenced in the Netherlands in 1702 with the Allied siege and capture of Kaiserswerth, and with the unsuccessful assault of the French army on Nijmegen. The French forces that invaded Zeeland were repelled when they tried to take Middelburg. Marlborough took command of the combined Anglo-Dutch army on 1 July and at the head of 60,000 men went on the offensive by moving into the Spanish Netherlands. Like Frederick Henry in 1632, (Note: See the Capture of Maastricht) the British commander followed the course of the river Meuse. The river was very important as a line of operation, because, due to the inadequacy of the land roads at that time, the possession of a river or a canal to transport an army's military necessities was not only advantageous, but almost necessary.

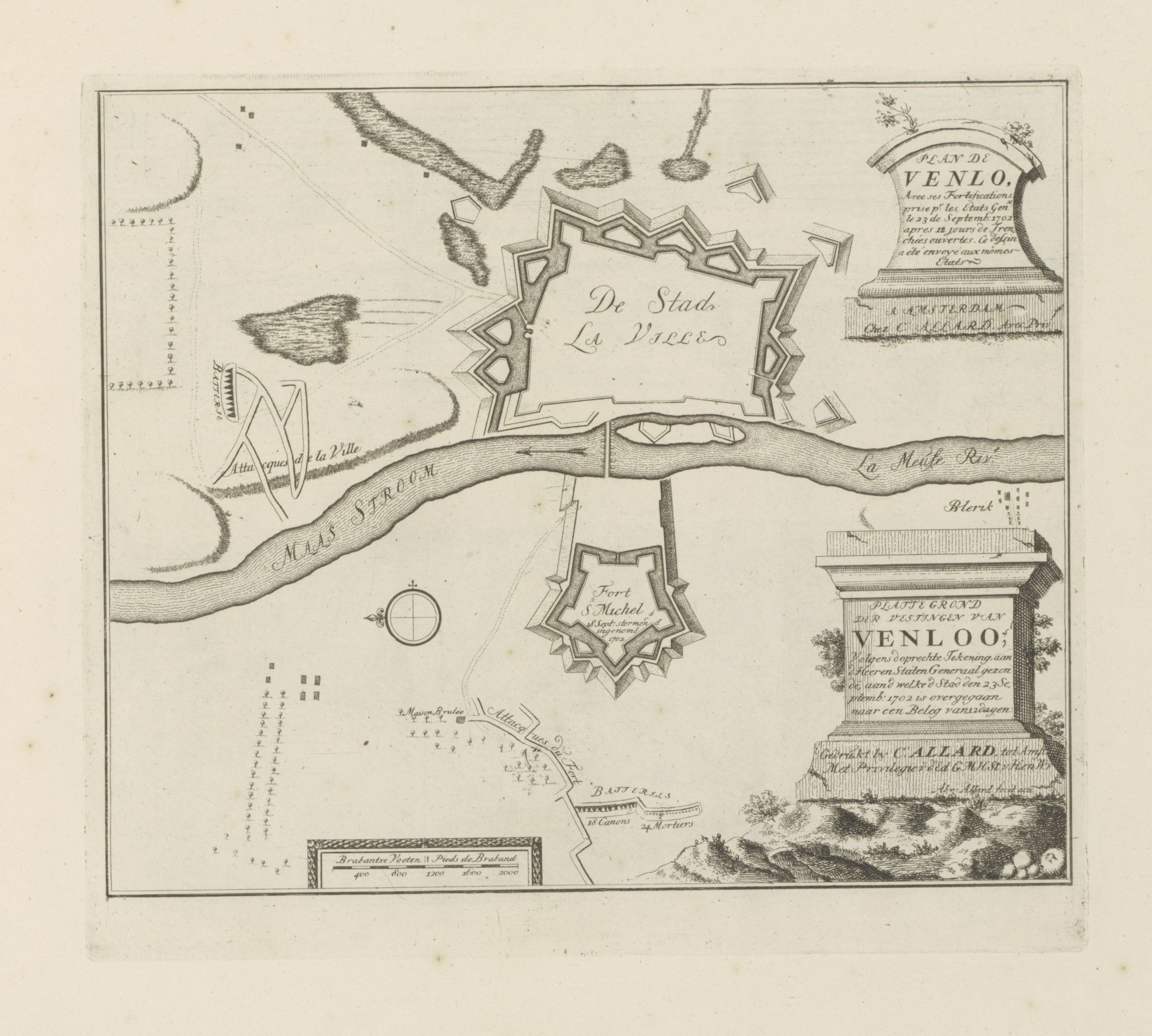
Map of the 1702 siege of Venlo

After outmaneuvering the French army of Boufflers, Marlborough proceeded with the allied army towards Venlo, where the Dutch Obdam and Prussian General Von Heiden had already invested the city. Venlo could not be considered a particularly strong fortress, neither due to its location nor its defensive works. Originally, like all strongholds in the Spanish Netherlands, it had been in a state of total neglect. In the past year, however, the French had significantly improved its condition. Venlo and the associated fort Sint-Michiel were occupied by 2,500 French troops under Brigadier de Labadie. The governor of the city was the Count of Varo.

== Battle ==
Despite lasting only twelve days, the siege of Venlo proved bloody due to extensive artillery use. Famine and hot weather already plagued the city before the siege began. The massive movement of soldiers spread disease, causing Venlo's population to decline by 10%. Christian Davies, a dragoon in the army, reported that Venlo's inhabitants fled the city during the siege, abandoning their possessions.

Six days after the initial siege started, Allied forces stormed and assaulted the Citadel, and on 23 September, the garrison of Venlo was forced to surrender.

== Aftermath ==
The Allied victory at Venlo was a major victory for the Grand Alliance, because the victory marked a turning point in the Low Countries which saw the French invasion of the Netherlands get repelled and the War opening up in the Southern Netherlands and near the Meuse. The 1702 siege of Venlo was also one of the most significant sieges of the history of Venlo and one of the most significant sieges in the Low Countries during the Spanish War of Succession. King Louis XIV saw the taking of the city as a major defeat. He identified Venlo as the key to Guelders and to further fortresses along the Rhine, all critical to French defense and military success.

After victory in Venlo, the Grand Alliance saw even more success in which the Allied forces took the cities of Stevensweert, Roermond and Liège among the Meuse.

Venlo itself along with other parts of Spanish Guelders were ceded to the Dutch Republic after the Peace of Utrecht.

== Sources ==
- Coetzee, Daniel (2013). Philosophers of War, The Evolution of History's Greatest Military Thinkers (E-book ed.). ABC-CLIO. ISBN 978-0-313-07033-4.
- Snoddgrass, Mary Ellen (2017). World Epidemics, A Cultural Chronology of Disease from Prehistory to the Era of Zika (E-book ed.). McFarland, Incorporated, Publishers. ISBN 978-1-4766-3106-6.
- Knoop, Willem Jan (1861). Krijgs- en geschiedkundige geschriften. Deel 1 [Martial and historical writings. Volume 1] (in Dutch). H. A. M. Roelants.
- Wijn, J.W. (1956). Het Staatsche Leger: Deel VIII Het tijdperk van de Spaanse Successieoorlog [The Dutch States Army: Part VIII The era of the War of the Spanish Succession] (in Dutch). Martinus Nijhoff.
- Nimwegen, Olaf van (1995). De subsistentie van het leger: Logistiek en strategie van het Geallieerde en met name het Staatse leger tijdens de Spaanse Successieoorlog in de Nederlanden en het Heilige Roomse Rijk (1701-1712) [The subsistence of the Allied and especially the Dutch army during the War of the Spanish Succession] (Thesis) (in Dutch). Universiteit Utrecht.
- Falkner, James (2005). Marlborough's Wars: Eyewitness Accounts, 1702–1713 (E-book ed.). Pen & Sword Books. ISBN 978-1-78159-685-2.
