= Menno van Coehoorn =

Dutch States Army officer and engineer (1641–1704)

Menno, Baron van Coehoorn
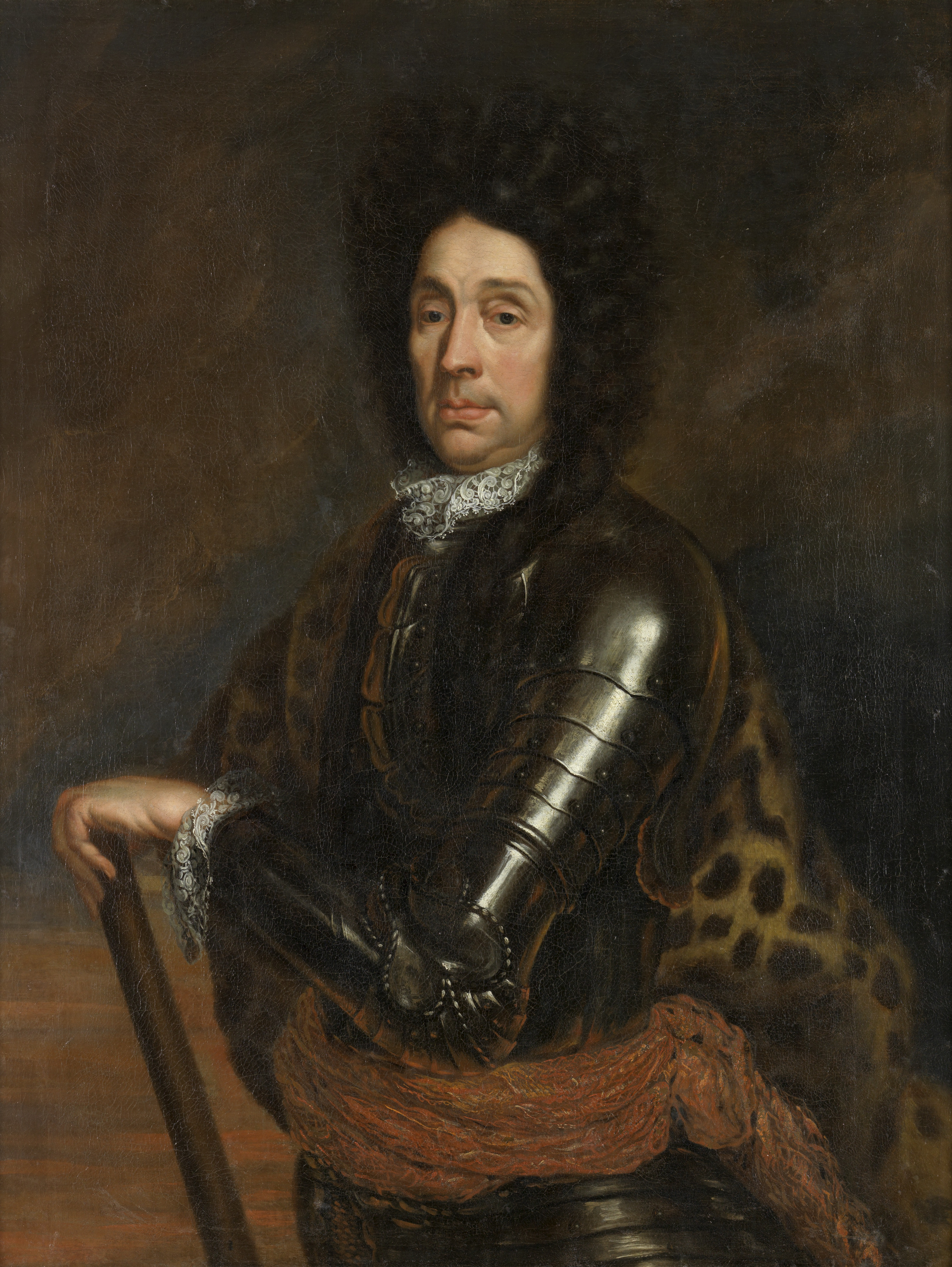
- Menno, Baron van Coehoorn.
- Born: March 1641; Britsum, Friesland, Dutch Republic
- Died: 17 March 1704 (aged 62–63) The Hague, Dutch Republic
- Buried: Wijkel
- Allegiance: Dutch Republic
- Service years: 1657 – 1704
- Rank: Lieutenant General; Ingenieur Generaal der Fortificatiën; General of Artillery
- Commands: Garrison Commander Namur 1692; Zeelandic Flanders 1702
- Conflicts: Second Anglo-Dutch War; Franco-Dutch War; Siege of Maastricht; Battle of Seneffe; Siege of Grave; Battle of Cassel; Battle of Saint-Denis; Nine Years' War; Siege of Bonn; Battle of Fleurus; 1st Siege of Namur; Siege of Huy; 2nd Siege of Namur; Bombardment of Givet; War of the Spanish Succession; Siege of Saint Donas; Siege of Venlo; Siege of Roermond; Capture of Liége; Siege of Bonn; Siege of Huy

Menno, Baron van Coehoorn (Note: Dutch pronunciation: [ˈmɛnoː vɑŋ ˈkuɦoːr(ə)n]) (March 1641 – 17 March 1704) was a Dutch States Army officer and engineer, regarded as one of the most significant figures in Dutch military history. In an era when siege warfare dominated military campaigns, he and his French counterpart Vauban were the acknowledged experts in designing, taking and defending fortifications.

Both had their advocates; Vauban's maxim of 'more powder, less blood' also took longer, an important consideration when most military deaths occurred from disease. He is also viewed as more innovative in the design and extent of his fortifications, which included ports, waterways, roads and even town layouts.

Unlike Vauban, Van Coehoorn had limited financial resources. He showed great skill in maximising these, while adapting to the specific challenges posed by the flat terrain in the Netherlands. Some of his water defences and designs were still being used in the 1950s.

== Life ==
The United Provinces; Friesland at top

Van Coehoorn was born at Britsum in March 1641, one of six sons of Goosewijn van Coehoorn and Aaltje van Hinckena, owners of the Lettinga State, near Leeuwarden, in the Dutch province of Friesland. Goosewijn was an officer in a Friesland regiment of the Dutch States Army and a member of the petty nobility. The family originally came from Kühhornshof, near Frankfurt; in 1572, his great-grandfather joined the army of William the Silent, leader of the Dutch Revolt.

Van Coehoorn was educated at home with his brothers, and showed an aptitude for mathematics and military drawing. He later attended the University of Franeker, where he was supervised by his uncle Bernardus Fullenius (1602–1657), professor of mathematics and trainer of surveyors.

He had four surviving children from his first marriage to Magdalena van Scheltinga in 1678: Goosewijn (1678–1737), Gertruda (1679–1757), Hendrik (1683–1756) and Amalia (1683–1708). After her death in 1683, he married Truytje van Wigara (dates unknown); he died on 17 March 1704 and was buried at Wijckel.

== Early career ==
In 1657, he was commissioned Lieutenant in his father's company, part of the permanent garrison in Maastricht. Promoted captain in October 1660, Van Coehoorn first saw action in 1665 during the Second Anglo-Dutch War, when he helped repulse an English-funded invasion by the Bishop of Münster. During the 1672 to 1678 Franco-Dutch War, he was wounded at the defence of Maastricht in 1673, then fought at Grave and Seneffe in 1674. Promoted major just before Cassel in 1677, he was a Lieutenant-Colonel when the war ended.

In the Netherlands, 1672 is still known as the Rampjaar or Year of Disaster. The rapid fall of major fortresses like Nijmegen and Fort Crèvecœur near 's-Hertogenbosch demonstrated the Republic's vulnerability, and the obsolescence of its defences. This caused intense debate in two areas; first, where to locate strongpoints; second, how to design fortifications suitable to the flat terrain of the Netherlands.

== Design principles ==
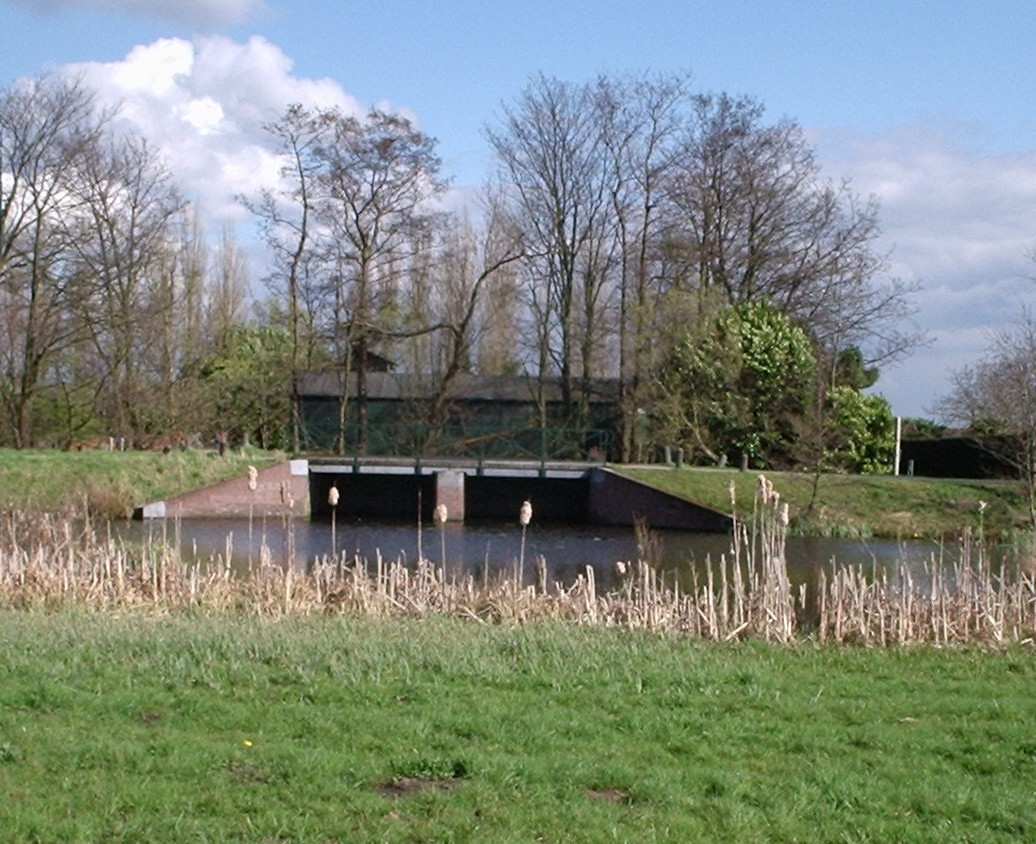
Sluice gate near Utrecht; Van Coehoorn incorporated water defences in his designs

Van Coehoorn set out his ideas in a public debate over the design of a new fortress at Coevorden with Captain Louis Paen, an officer in the same regiment, who had produced a well-received critique of the Dutch drill manual in 1679. In 1682, Van Coehoorn published Versterckinge des Vijfhoeks met al syne buytenwerken or Fortification of the Pentagon and all its outer works; this was followed in 1685 by what remains his best-known work, Nieuwe Vestingbouw op een natte of lage horisont or New Fortress Construction on a Wet or Low Horizon.

Few states could afford a large standing army, so permanent fortifications were intended to slow down an opponent, providing time to mobilise reserves. In 1672, the Dutch were nearly over-run due to the speed with which the French captured fortresses like Nijmegen, and saved only by activating the Hollandic Water Line. Van Coehoorn accepted the flat terrain of the Netherlands and huge cost of construction meant an effective defence could not rely solely on fortifications. His designs included these key principles;

Active defence; defenders should constantly disrupt the besiegers, rather than simply sitting behind their walls. This meant providing open areas within the fortifications to assemble a counter-attacking force.

Multiple defence lines; the existing practice of all round defence meant a breach in one area often led to the rapid surrender of the whole position. Instead, Van Coehoorn created multiple 'Inner' and 'Outer' defence zones that funnelled attackers through successive 'killing zones' of flanking fire, variously delivered from loopholed redoubts in the re-entrant places-of-arms, from earthen faussebrayes, and long, concave double-bastioned flanks. These works were screened from view by their low profiles, and, in the case of the flanks, by narrow, tower-like orillons of solid masonry";

Denial of terrain; "... he protected his works by digging alternate ranks of wet and dry ditches. The dry ditches and covertways were cut down to within a few inches of the water table ... (if the besiegers) cut into the floor in the normal way, they would soon be flooded out;"

Van Coehoorn argued the high water table common in the Netherlands negated the danger posed by mining, and thus he required only two-thirds of the materials needed for similar French fortifications. Water was another feature of his work; although completed years after his death, he designed the Zuider Waterlinie between Sluis and Nijmegen. His recommendation of a defensive barrier in the east, using the IJssel and the Dutch portion of the Lower Rhine, formed the basis of a NATO defence line built in the 1950s, codenamed Plans 'C' for Coehoorn and 'D' for Deventer.

== Namur; the Sieges of 1692 and 1695 ==
The Spanish Netherlands; key locations plus major Dutch sites

His ideas remained untested until the 1688-1697 Nine Years War, whose tactics placed great emphasis on manoeuvre and siege warfare. He was present at the capture of Kaiserswerth and Bonn in 1690; his role is unclear but Frederick I offered him a position as Major-General in the Prussian army, which he refused.

Van Coehoorn was finally able to implement his ideas when appointed commander of Namur in 1691. Namur was divided between the 'City', on the flat northern bank of the river Sambre, with the 'Citadel' on high ground to the south controlling access to the rivers Sambre and Meuse. He strengthened the 'inner' Citadel with new outworks at Fort William and La Casotte, but did not have time to do the same for the 'outer' City area. The garrison of 5,000 was too small for an active defence, and many of those were poorly trained and poorly motivated Spanish troops.

In the 1692 Siege of Namur, the City fell in less than five days, but the Citadel and its 500 Dutch defenders held out for 30 more days, until 30 June. This was largely due to the terms negotiated when Van Coehoorn surrendered the City; he agreed not to fire on the City from the Citadel, in return for the French not attacking from that direction. As Vauban pointed out, this made it almost impregnable.

Regardless, the defence was a significant achievement and William III made him Major-General and commander of the vital city of Liège. He also supervised the construction of new defences at Huy, which the Dutch lost in July 1693, then recaptured in September 1694.

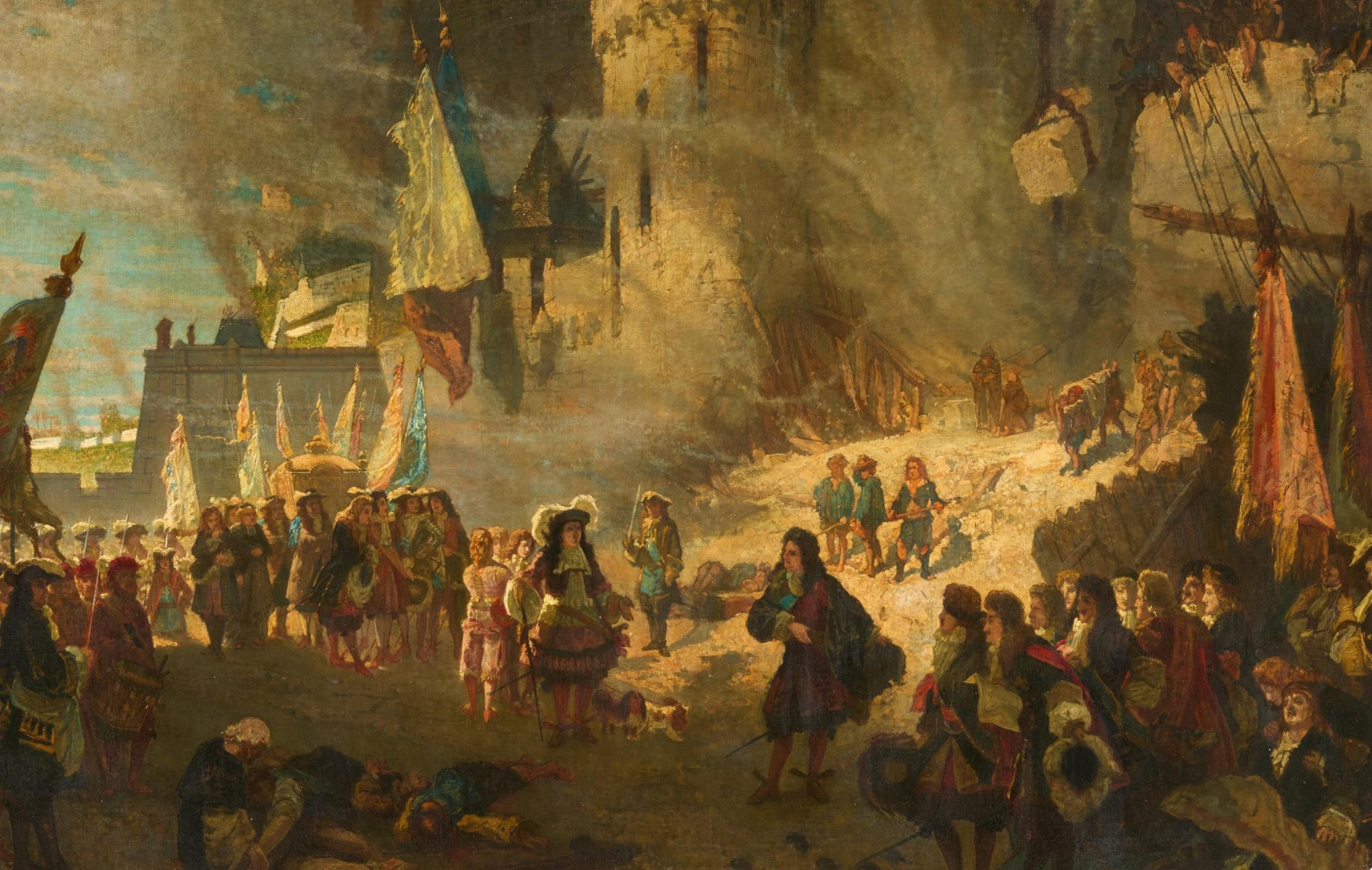
Coehoorn and his rival Vauban meet in the ruins of Namur, 1692. By August Allebé.

The focus of the 1695 Allied campaign was the second Siege of Namur. The fortifications had been strengthened by Vauban, while Marshall Boufflers had a garrison of 13,000. Van Coehoorn was put in charge of siege operations and quickly captured the outer City; by mid-August, the Citadel remained largely intact and William was growing impatient. A battery of 200 guns was established and on 21 August began a continuous 24 hour bombardment of the Citadel's lower defences; assaults on the resulting breaches were extremely bloody (including 3,000 casualties incurred in just three hours on 30 August), but the defenders surrendered on 4 September.

The two sieges of Namur were the key events of the Nine Years War in Flanders and solidified Van Coehoorn's reputation. Nieuwe Vestingbouw was translated into English, French, German and several other languages and reprinted on a regular basis, while his ideas were widely applied elsewhere, including Mannheim, Belgrade and Temesvar. Ironically, Boufflers' defence of Namur was the best example of Van Coehoorn's defensive principles. He ...demonstrated one could effectively win a campaign by losing a fortress but exhausting the besieging force...(Boufflers) conducted a classic active defence and contested every advance as best he could.

An often overlooked innovation used by both Vauban and Van Coehoorn was to focus their entire artillery on specific points, rather than the previous practice of targeting multiple areas. Overwhelming defences with massive firepower became known as the 'Van Coehoorn method'; Vauban preferred a more gradual approach, summarised as 'more powder, less blood.' Both had their supporters; the trade-off was time, an important consideration at a time when far more soldiers died from disease than combat.

== Later career ==
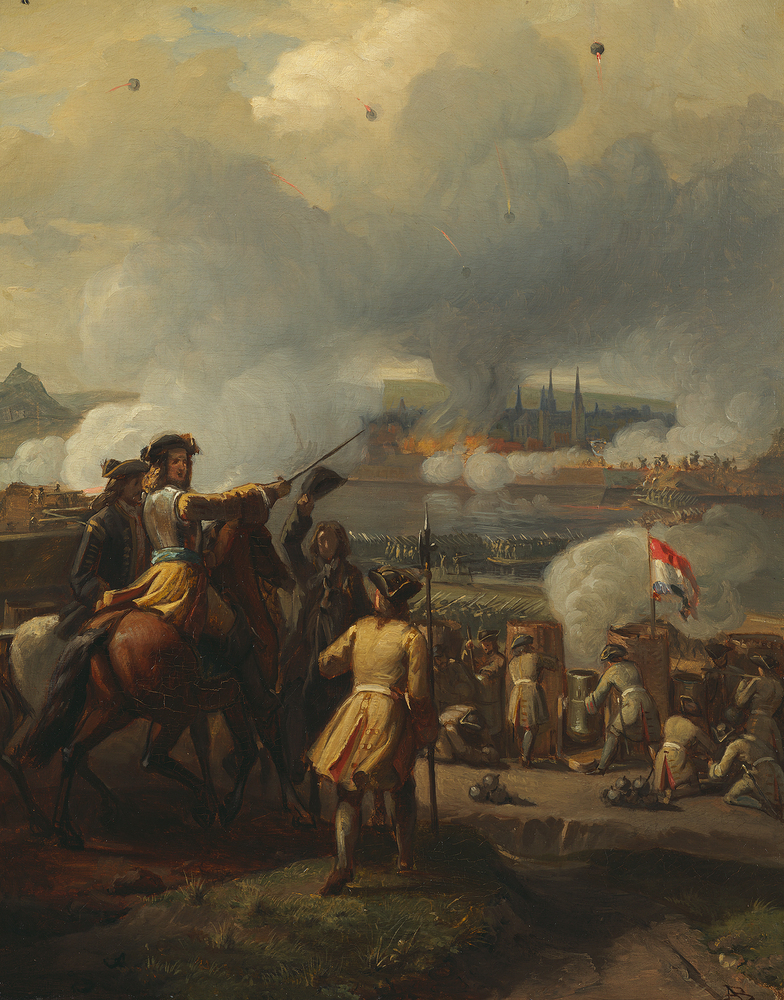
Coehoorn at the 1703 Siege of Bonn.

In recognition of his service, Van Coehoorn was promoted Lieutenant General and appointed Ingenieur Generaal der Fortificatiën (Inspector General of Fortifications) and General of Artillery. His brother Gideon replaced him as Colonel of the Nassau Friesland Regiment, while Van Coehoorn himself transferred to a Holland regiment; this increased his influence, since he now reported to William, rather than the Frisian Stadholder Hendrik Casimir.

The 1697 Treaty of Ryswick allowed the Dutch to garrison towns in the Spanish Netherlands, including Nieuwpoort, Charleroi, Luxembourg, Mons and Namur. This created a buffer zone, or defence-in-depth, later formalised in the 1715 Barrier Treaty. Van Coehoorn was given responsibility for the Dutch Republic's fortifications; one of his strengths was adapting to fit individual sites and minimising costs, both essential skills as the Dutch had insufficient funds for all the repairs and additions needed.

Nijmegen and Bergen op Zoom were prioritised for upgrades, although these were incomplete when the War of the Spanish Succession broke out. Van Coehoorn was appointed Governor of Sluis and military commander in Zeelandic Flanders. The armies of the Nine Years War often exceeded 100,000 men, too large for the pre-industrial societies that supported them; Marlborough, Allied commander in the Low Countries, argued one battle was more beneficial than taking 12 fortresses.

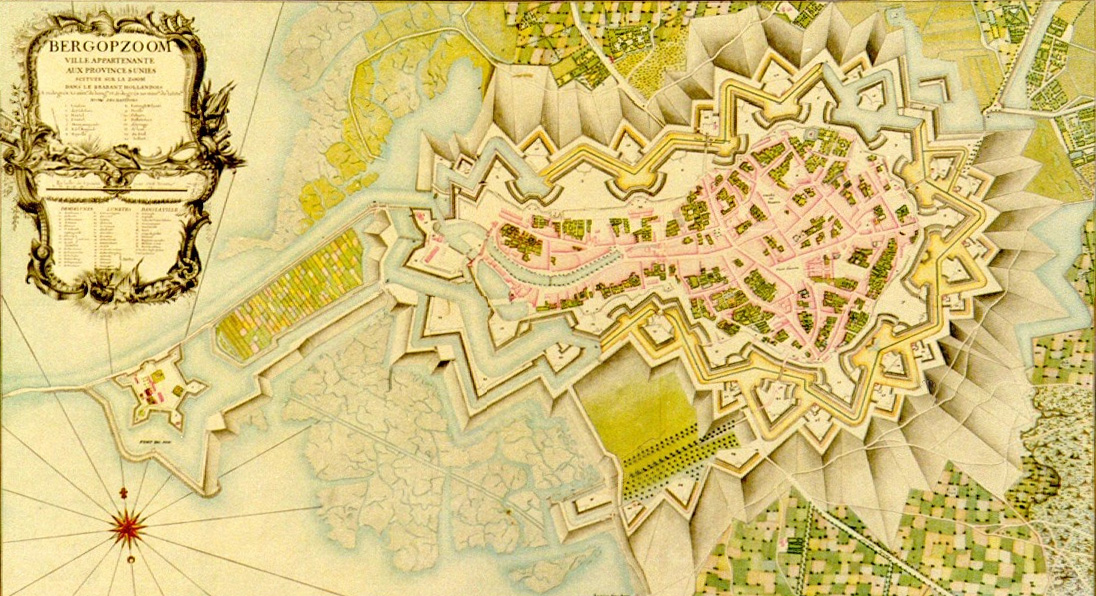
Bergen op Zoom in 1747. Van Coehoorn's ideas to strengthen the fortress were largely completed after his death; note diversion of the Scheldt.

Although Van Coehoorn agreed, the Dutch survived a century of almost constant warfare by keeping their army together; losing a battle might lose them the war, and they considered Marlborough's approach unnecessarily risky. Instead, they spent 1702 and 1703 taking towns such as Venlo and Roermond in the modern Dutch province of Limburg, as well as Liège, Bonn and Huy. Strategy was affected by conflicting objectives, between England and the Republic and also the States General. The States of Holland opposed the 1703 offensive against Ostend and Huy, so Marlborough instead attacked Antwerp. In the subsequent operation, Coehoorn broke through the French lines west of the Scheldt but another a Dutch division was surrounded by a French force several times their size at Ekeren on 30 June, and only just escaped.

Rightly or wrongly, Van Coehoorn was partly blamed for this; he was a difficult character and William's death deprived him of his most powerful sponsor. The campaigns of 1702 and 1703 exposed his limitations as a field officer and led to criticism from Marlborough and his Dutch colleagues.

He was considering an offer to serve with the army of Savoy when he died on 17 March 1704 in The Hague, attending a conference with Marlborough. The States of Friesland paid for a monument over his grave at Wijckel.

== Other ==
In May 1701, Van Coehoorn demonstrated a light-weight mortar to William, later known as the Coehorn. Designed to provide cover for infantry assaults, it was first used at Kaiserworth in 1702 and variations remained in service during the US Civil War in 1861. He also led a number of significant civil projects, including re-dyking the Lower Scheldt, and designing new barrages along the Zuiderzee.

The Menno van Coehoorn Foundation was established in 1932 to preserve the cultural heritage of historical fortifications in the Netherlands and their associated wildlife.

His son Gosewijn Theodor van Coehoorn (1678–1736) wrote a biography of his father, The Life Of Menno Baron Van Coehoorn which is still in print.

== Sources ==
- Afflerbach, Holger; Strachan, Hew, eds. (2012). How Fighting Ends: A History of Surrender. OUP. ISBN 978-0199693627.
- Bromley, A.S., ed. (1970). The New Cambridge Modern History: Volume 6, The Rise of Great Britain and Russia, 1688-1715. Cambridge University Press. ISBN 0521293960.
- Childs, John (1991). The Nine Years War and the British Army 1688-97: The Operations in the Low Countries. Manchester University Press. ISBN 978-0719089961.
- van Coehoorn, M. (1685). Nieuwe vestingbouw, op een natte of lage horisont; etc. Hendrik Rintjes.
- van Coehoorn, Gozewijn Theodoor; van Sypesteyn, Willem Jan (1860). Het Leven Van Menno Baron Van Coehoorn (in Dutch). Kessinger Publishing Co. ISBN 1104059185.
- Duffy, Christopher (1995). Siege Warfare: The Fortress in the Early Modern World 1494-1660. Routledge. ISBN 978-0415146494.
- Eysten (1911). "Coehoorn (Menno baron van)". In P.J. Blok; P.C. Molhuysen (eds.). Nieuw Nederlandsch Biografisch Woordenboek. Deel 1 (in Dutch).
- Hoogendoorn, K (2018). Bibliography of the Exact Sciences in the Low Countries from ca. 1470 to the Golden Age (1700) (Bi-lingual ed.). Brill. ISBN 978-9004297944.
- Lenihan, Padraig (2011). "Namur Citadel, 1695: A Case Study in Allied Siege Tactics". War in History. 18 (3): 282–303. doi:10.1177/0968344511401296. hdl:10379/6195. S2CID 159682220.
- Lund, Erik (2002). Sandler, Stanley (ed.). Ground Warfare: An International Encyclopedia (Warfare Series); Volume I. ABC-CLIO Ltd. ISBN 978-1576073445.
- Lynn, John (1999). The Wars of Louis XIV, 1667-1714 (Modern Wars In Perspective). Longman. ISBN 0582056292.
- de la Colonie, Martin; Horsley, Walter (1904). The Chronicles of an Old Campaigner M. de la Colonie, 1692-1717 (2015 ed.). Scholars Choice. ISBN 1296409791.
- Nolan, Cathal (2008). Wars of the Age of Louis XIV, 1650-1715: An Encyclopedia of Global Warfare. Greenwood. ISBN 978-0313330469.
- Ostwald, Jamel (2006). Vauban Under Siege: Engineering Efficiency and Martial Vigor in the War of the Spanish Succession. Brill. ISBN 9004154892.
- Van Hoof, Jaep (2004). Menno van Coehoorn 1641 - 1704, Vestingbouwer ~ belegeraar ~ infanterist (in Dutch). Instituut voor Militaire Geschiedenis.
- Van Nimwegen, Olaf (2010). The Dutch Army and the Military Revolutions, 1588-1688. Boydell Press. ISBN 978-1843835752.
- Viganò, Marino (2007). Petrus Morettinus tribunus militum. Un ingegnere militare locarnese al servizio estero Pietro Morettini (1660–1737) (in Italian). Casagrande. ISBN 978-8877134776.
- Young, William (2004). International Politics and Warfare in the Age of Louis XIV. iUniverse.
