= Wijckel =

Wijckel Wikel
- Village
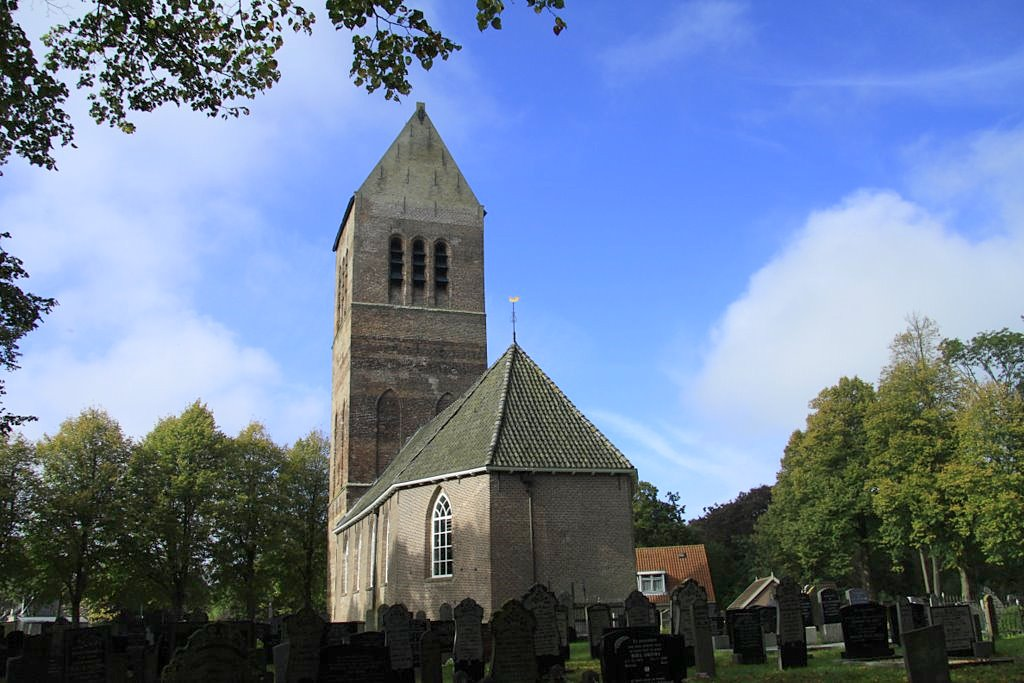
- Wijckel church

- Flag Coat of arms

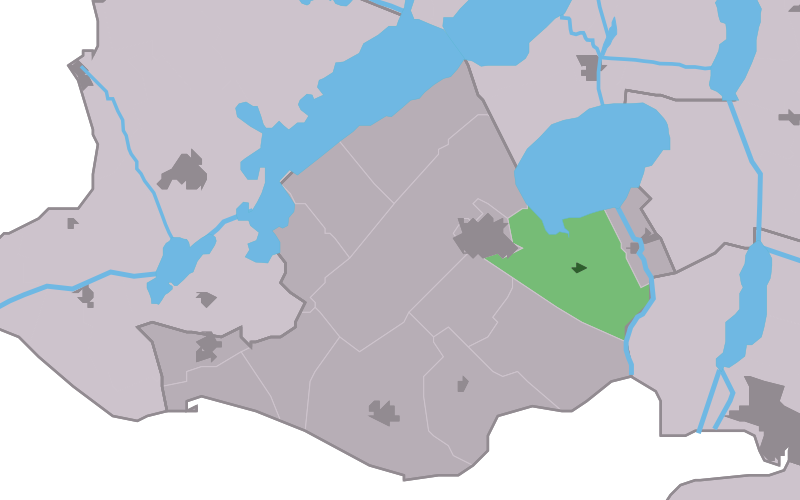
- Location in the former Gaasterlân-Sleat municipality

- Location in the Netherlands Wijckel (Netherlands)
- Country: Netherlands
- Province: Friesland
- Municipality: De Fryske Marren

Area
  - Total: 11.71 km^{2} (4.52 sq mi)
- Elevation: 2 m (6.6 ft)

Population (2021)
  - Total: 625
  - Density: 53.4/km^{2} (138/sq mi)
- Time zone: UTC+1 (CET)
  - Summer (DST): UTC+2 (CEST)
- Postal code: 8563
- Dialing code: 0514

Wijckel (West Frisian: Wikel) is a village in De Fryske Marren municipality in the province of Friesland, the Netherlands. It had a population of around 645 in 2017.

== History ==
The village was first mentioned in the 13th century Wicle. The etymology is unclear. Wijckel is a spread out village along the roads. The Dutch Reformed Church has a 15th-century tower which has been enlarged in 1821. In 1671, a new church has been adjacent to the tower. In 1840, Wijckel was home to 470 people. In 1975, the tjasker Zandpoel was built.

Before 2014, Wijckel was part of the Gaasterlân-Sleat municipality and before 1984 it was part of Gaasterland.

== Notable people ==
Speed skater Marrit Leenstra is from Wijckel.

== Gallery ==
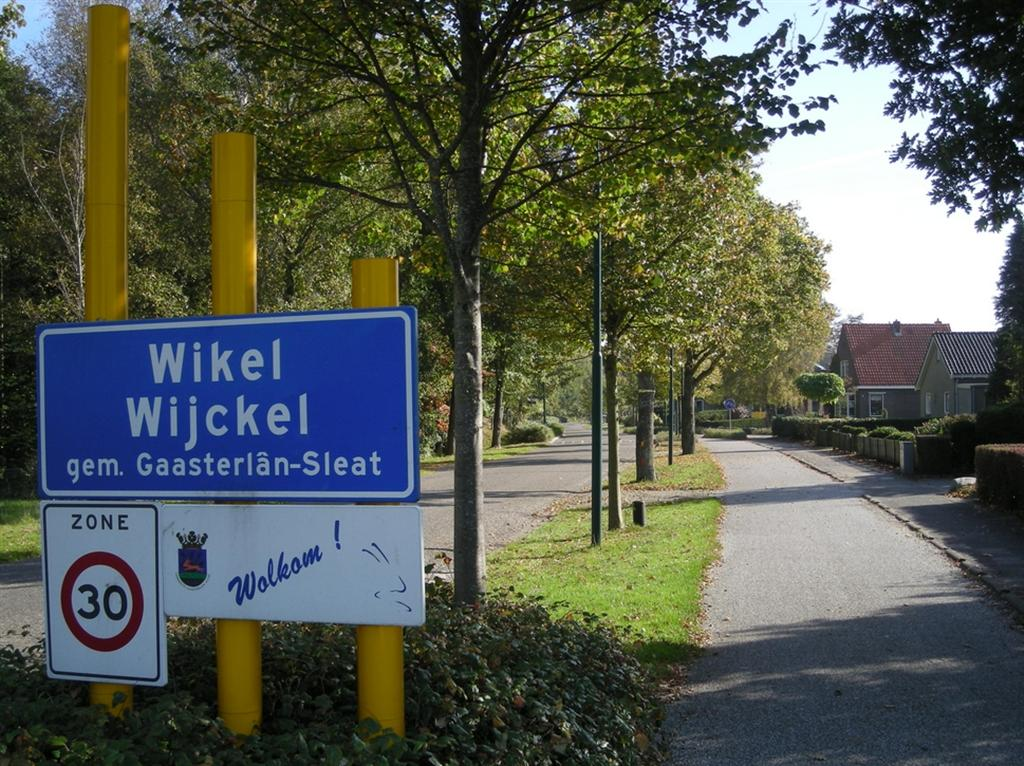
Welcome to Wijckel

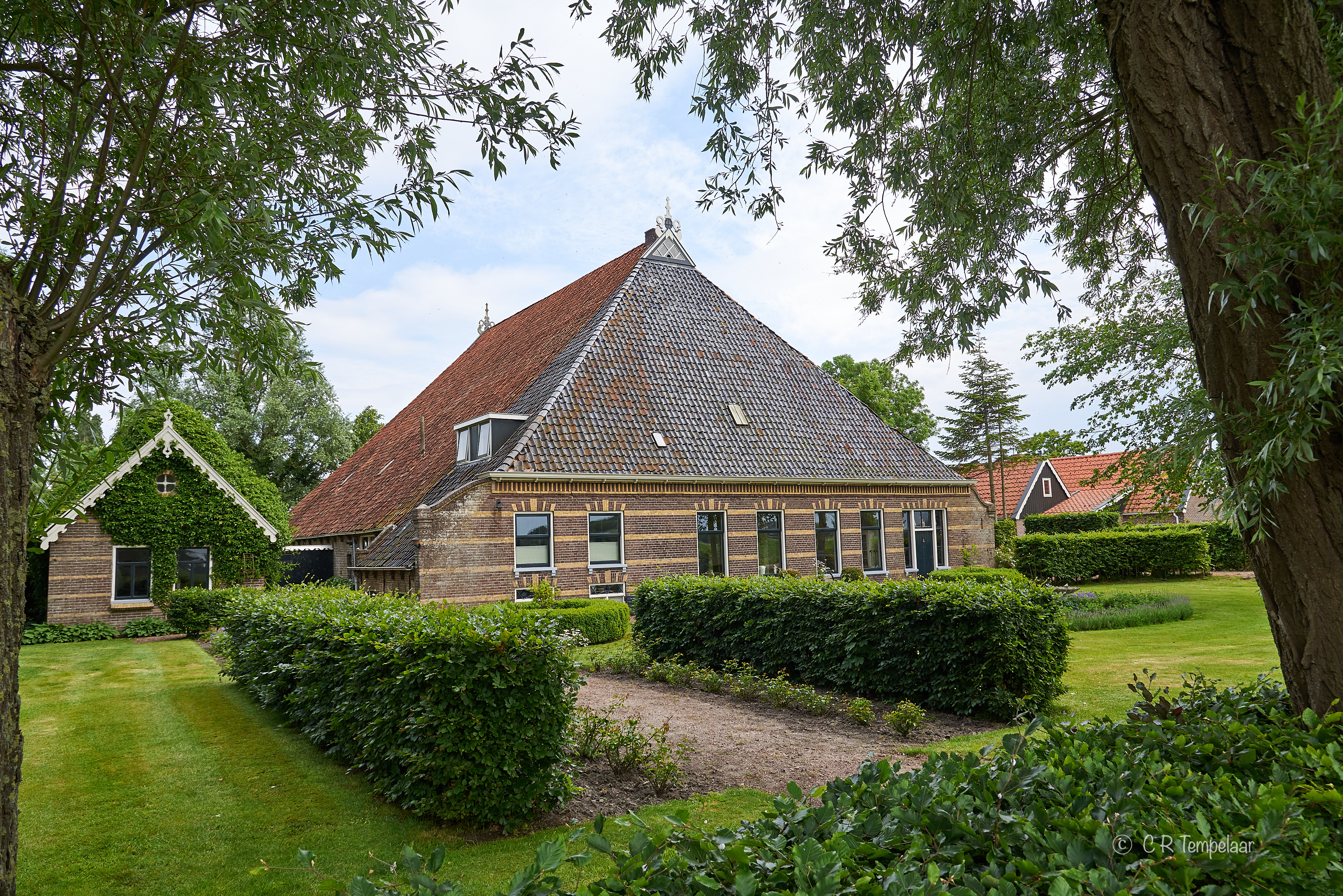
Farm in Wijckel

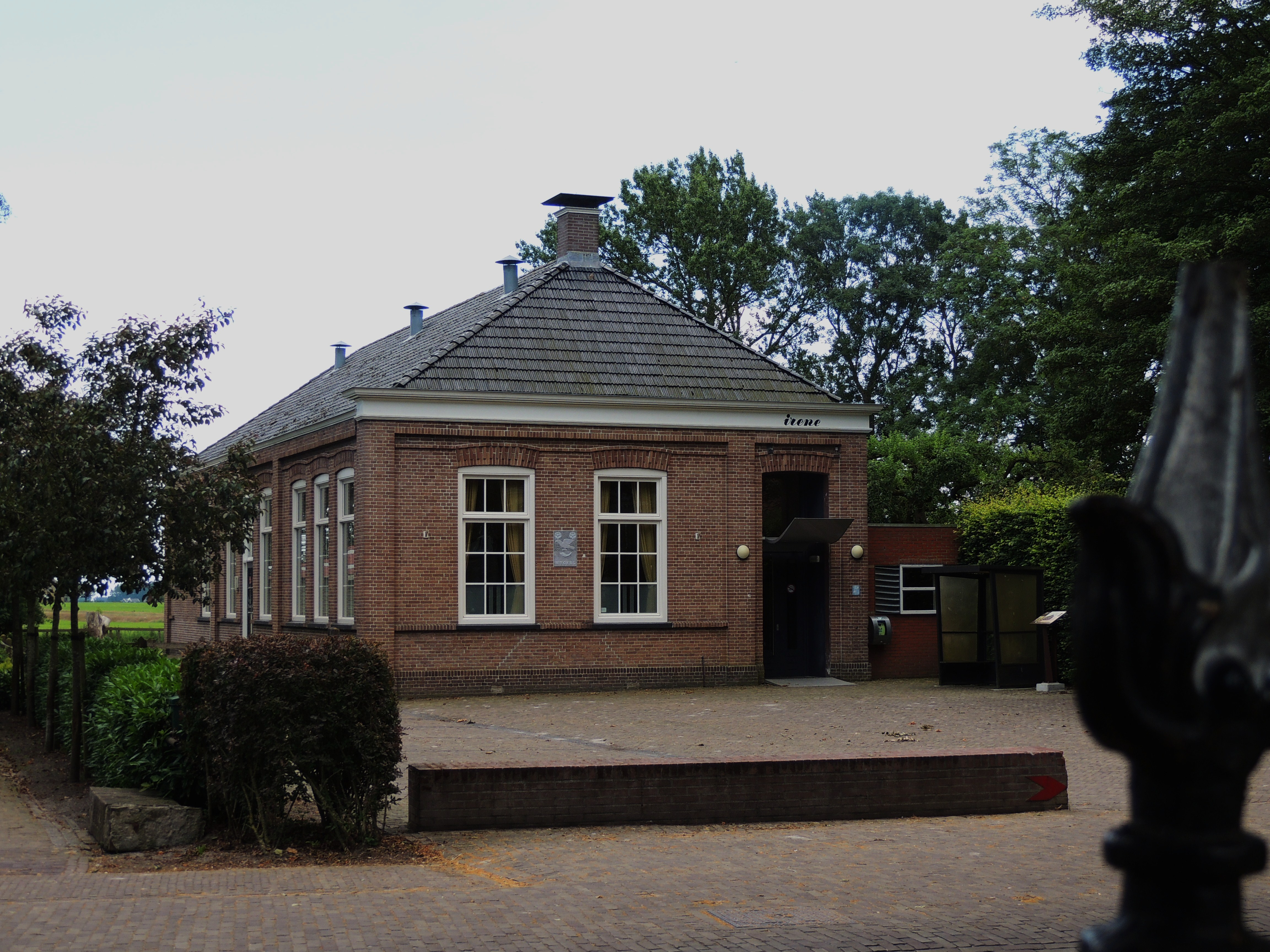
Former school. Nowadays village house

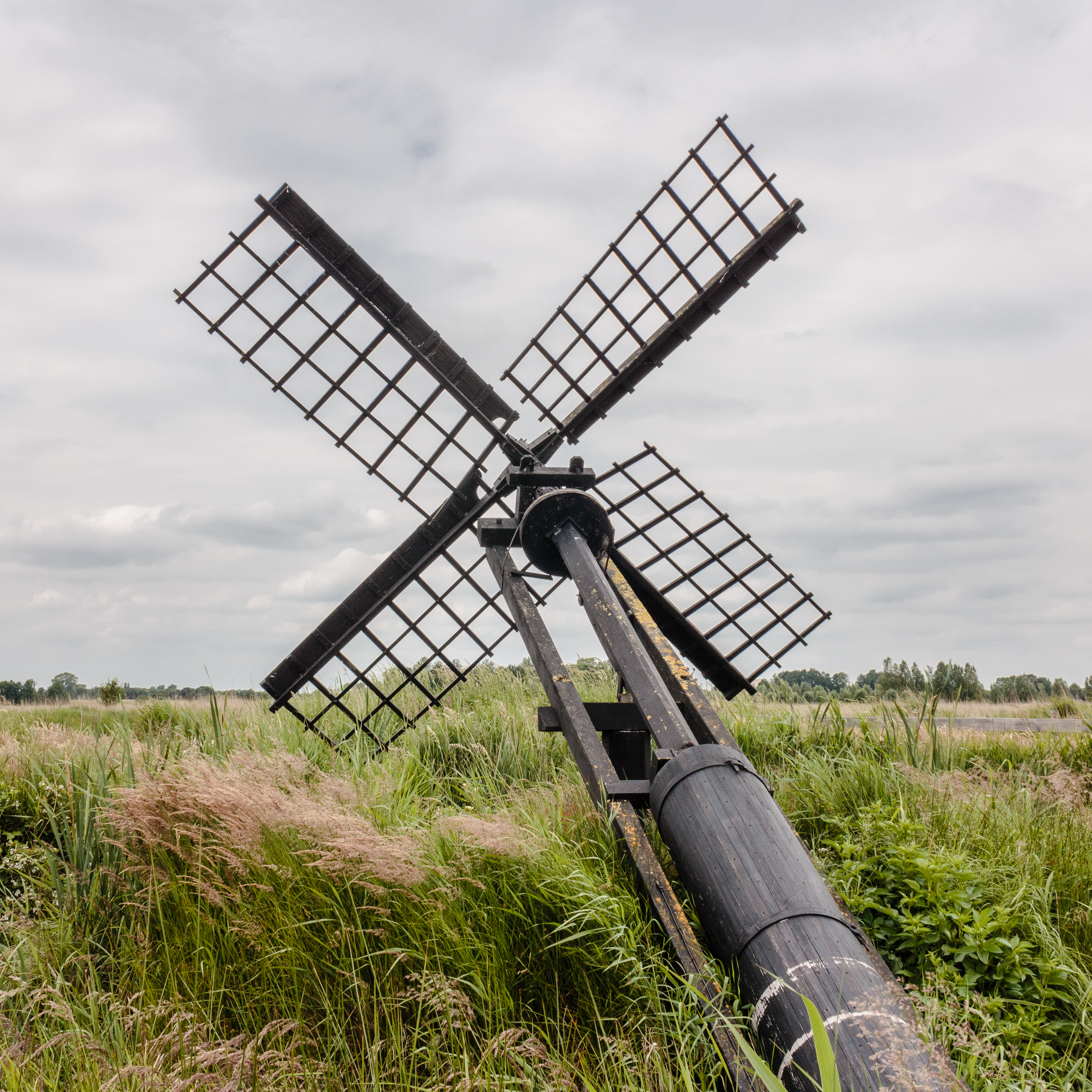
Tjasker Zandpoel
