= Godert de Ginkel, 1st Earl of Athlone =

Dutch States Army officer (1644–1703)

The Right Honourable The Earl of Athlone
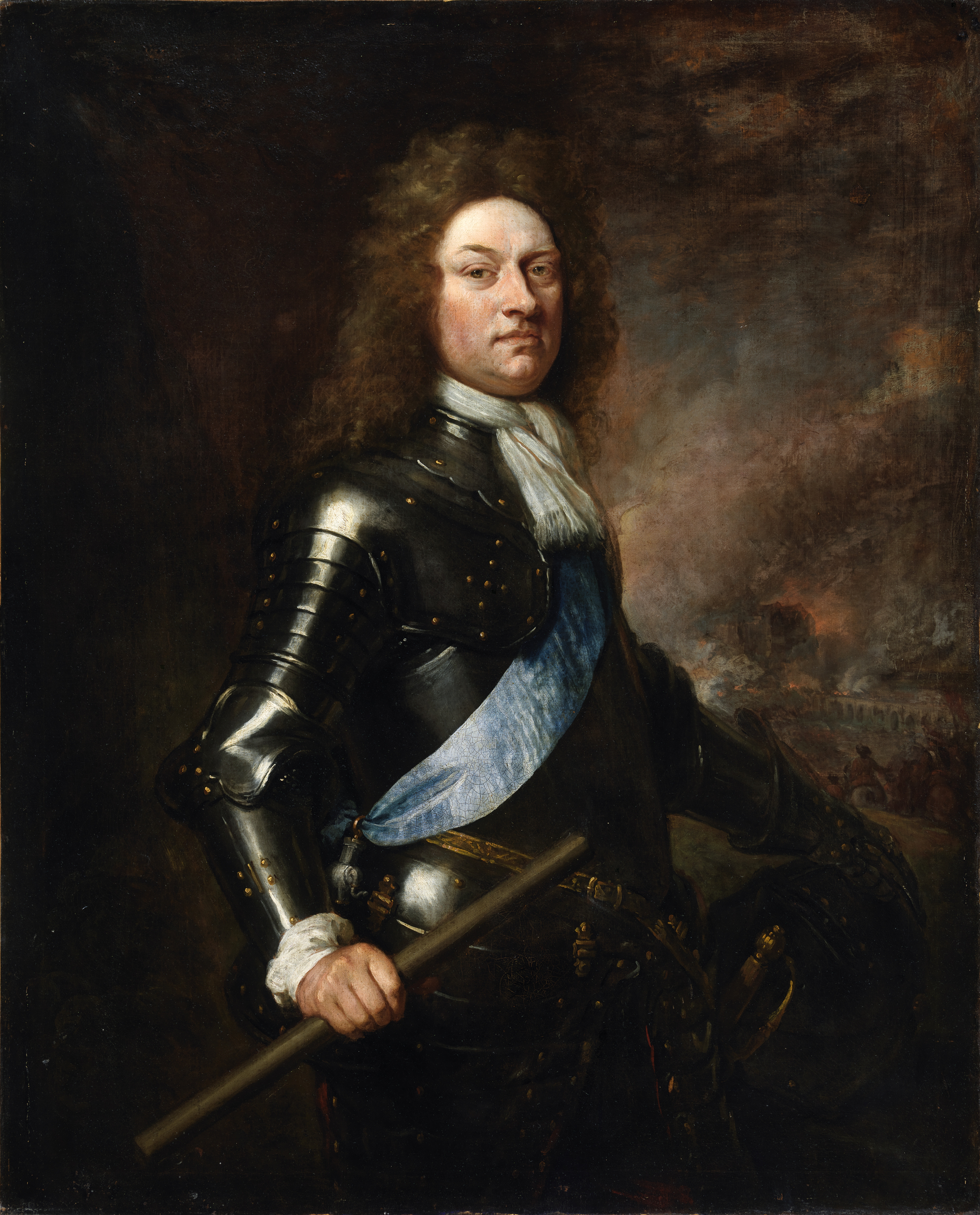
- Portrait by Sir Godfrey Kneller, 1691–1703

Personal details
- Born: 14 June 1644 (Note: Julian: 4 June 1644) Amerongen, Dutch Republic
- Died: 11 February 1703 Utrecht, Dutch Republic

Military service
- Battles/wars: First Münster War; Franco-Dutch War; Battle of Woerden; Siege of Naarden; Siege of Bonn; Battle of Seneffe; Siege of Maastricht; Battle of Cassel; Nine Years' War; 1688 Invasion of England; Mutiny of the Royal Scots; Williamite War in Ireland; Battle of the Boyne; Siege of Athlone; Battle of Aughrim; Siege of Limerick; Battle of Steenkerque; Battle of Landen; Siege of Namur; Bombardment of Givet; War of the Spanish Succession; Assault on Nijmegen; Siege of Venlo; Siege of Stevensweert; Siege of Roermond; Capture of Liège

Godard van Reede, 1st Earl of Athlone (Note: also known as Godert de Ginkell or Goddard von Ginkel) (14 June 1644 – 11 February 1703) was a Dutch States Army officer who rose to prominence during the Williamite War in Ireland. During the Franco-Dutch War, his bravery and meticulous execution of duties as a cavalry officer caught William of Orange's attention. Rapid promotions followed, and in 1691, he was entrusted with command of the war in Ireland. Alongside Waldeck and Schomberg, Athlone became one of the few senior officers to whom William granted independent command over the Anglo-Dutch forces during his wars.

He decisively defeated a Franco-Irish army at the Battle of Aughrim, securing control over Ireland. Back on the continent, he took part in the key battles and sieges of the Nine Years’ War. After William's death during the War of the Spanish Succession, he vied for command of the combined Anglo-Dutch army in the Low Countries, but the role was given to the Duke of Marlborough. Nevertheless, in 1702, the Dutch States General appointed Athlone as commander of the Dutch forces, but he died four months later.

== Early career ==
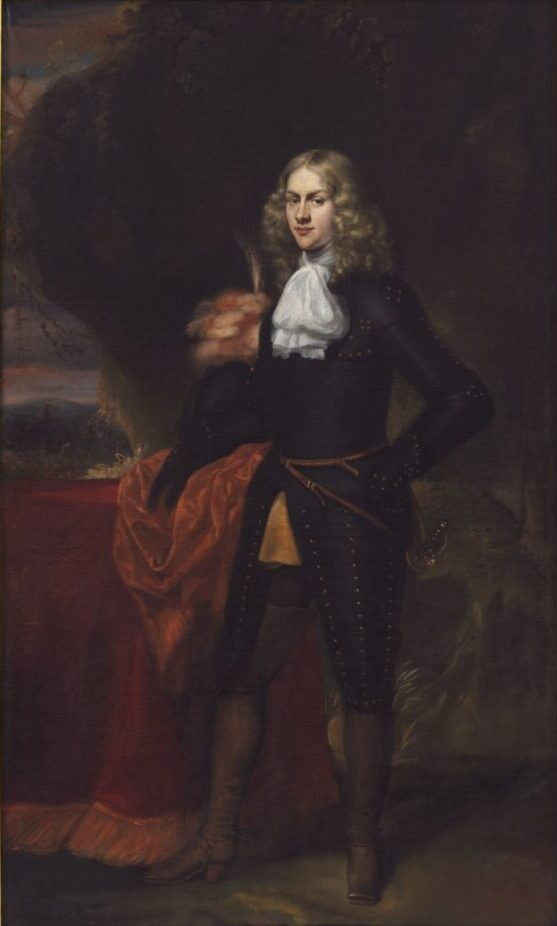
Godard van Reede-Ginkel at the age of sixteen, by Jürgen Ovens.

He was born in Amerongen, Utrecht, into a noble family as Baron van Reede, being the only child of Godard Adriaan van Reede, (1621–1691) and Margaretha Turnor, (1613-1700). In his youth he entered the Dutch cavalry as an officer, receiving his first commission at age 12. His first military experience was the First Münster War, in which he served under the overall command of John Maurice of Nassau-Siegen. In 1672, at the start of the Franco-Dutch War, Godard applied for the rank of major-general, but was passed over in favour of less capable officers, much to his displeasure. He remained colonel of his father's cavalry regiment. His unit was stationed at a fortress town near Doesburg, along the IJssel river, where the Dutch hoped to halt the Franco-German advance. However, after the French crossed the Rhine at Tolhuis, the IJssel Line was outflanked and rendered obsolete.

The young William III of Orange had been placed in command of the neglected Dutch army and was forced to retreat with his field army into the province of Holland. In the eastern part of the Republic, city after city fell to the French and German forces. Ginkel was deeply ashamed of the situation and wrote to his father: "We have come within a hair’s breadth of losing in three weeks the country our forefathers fought eighty years to defend." However, because the French besieged each fortress in the Republic individually, the pace of the invasion slowed, giving the Dutch army time to withdraw behind the Dutch Waterline. Ginkel, who had meanwhile been appointed acting major-general in place of De Montbas, who had been arrested for unnecessarily evacuating a key fortress, was stationed at the important post of Schoonhoven.

The poor condition of the Dutch army made Ginkel consider resigning his commission, but he ultimately decided to remain in service, fearing he would be shunned for the rest of his life if he abandoned the cause. The first action of any significance that Ginkel took part in was the Battle of Woerden on 12 October, where he commanded a number of small armed vessels sailing along the Waterline, from which they fired upon the French positions. His own attack focused on the nearby fort of Vreeswijk. The assault was successful, his men had taken control of much of the defensive works and would have taken the town when Ginkel ordered to retreat by the local commander. Although the town itself was not captured, the fortifications were destroyed. Following this action, he was promoted to brigadier. Although Woerden had not been taken, the Dutch army had fought well, and together with successes elsewhere, the morale of Ginkel and other Dutch officers began to improve. The French, it turned out, could be beaten.

At the end of the year, Ginkel took part in William's march to Charleroi, but suffered a stroke and did not participate in the siege itself. The next year he took part in the Dutch counteroffensive. At the siege of Naarden, he played a key part by leading the diversion that allowed William to deceive the French and capture the town. Following the conquest of Naarden, Ginkel took part in William's march into the lands of the Bishop of Cologne. Dutch troops committed widespread looting and destruction in revenge for what had been done to their own country. Ginkel wrote: "the land here is being ruined just as badly as our own poor provinces." William's objective was to take the city of Bonn, and Ginkel was with the army when the siege began on 3 November. Bonn was a key supply depot for the French and the capital of the Bishopric. Its capture forced the French to withdraw from the Republic and allowed William to reclaim the occupied provinces.

In 1674, Ginkel served with the allied army in the Spanish Netherlands and fought at the Battle of Seneffe, where he was severely wounded in the early stages of the fighting. He recovered quickly and continued to see action throughout the war. In 1675, he was finally promoted to major general. The following year, he took part in the siege of Maastricht, and in 1677, he distinguished himself at the Battle of Cassel. The war came to an end in 1678. In 1683 he was promoted to lieutenant-general.

== Nine Years' War ==
At the start of the Nine Years' War in 1688, he accompanied William, Prince of Orange, in his expedition to England—the "Glorious Revolution" which deposed James II. The following year, Ginkel distinguished himself by a memorable exploit—the pursuit and capture of a Scottish regiment that had mutinied for James at Ipswich and was marching northward across the Fens. The feat was also lauded in part due to the avoidance of violence, as the mutineers surrendered peacefully. However it was the alarm excited by this mutiny that facilitated the passing of the first Mutiny Act. In 1690, Ginkel accompanied William III to Ireland to take on the Jacobites, and commanded a body of Dutch cavalry at the Battle of the Boyne. On the king's return to England, General Ginkel was entrusted with the conduct of the war in Ireland. (See also Williamite war in Ireland).

=== War in Ireland ===
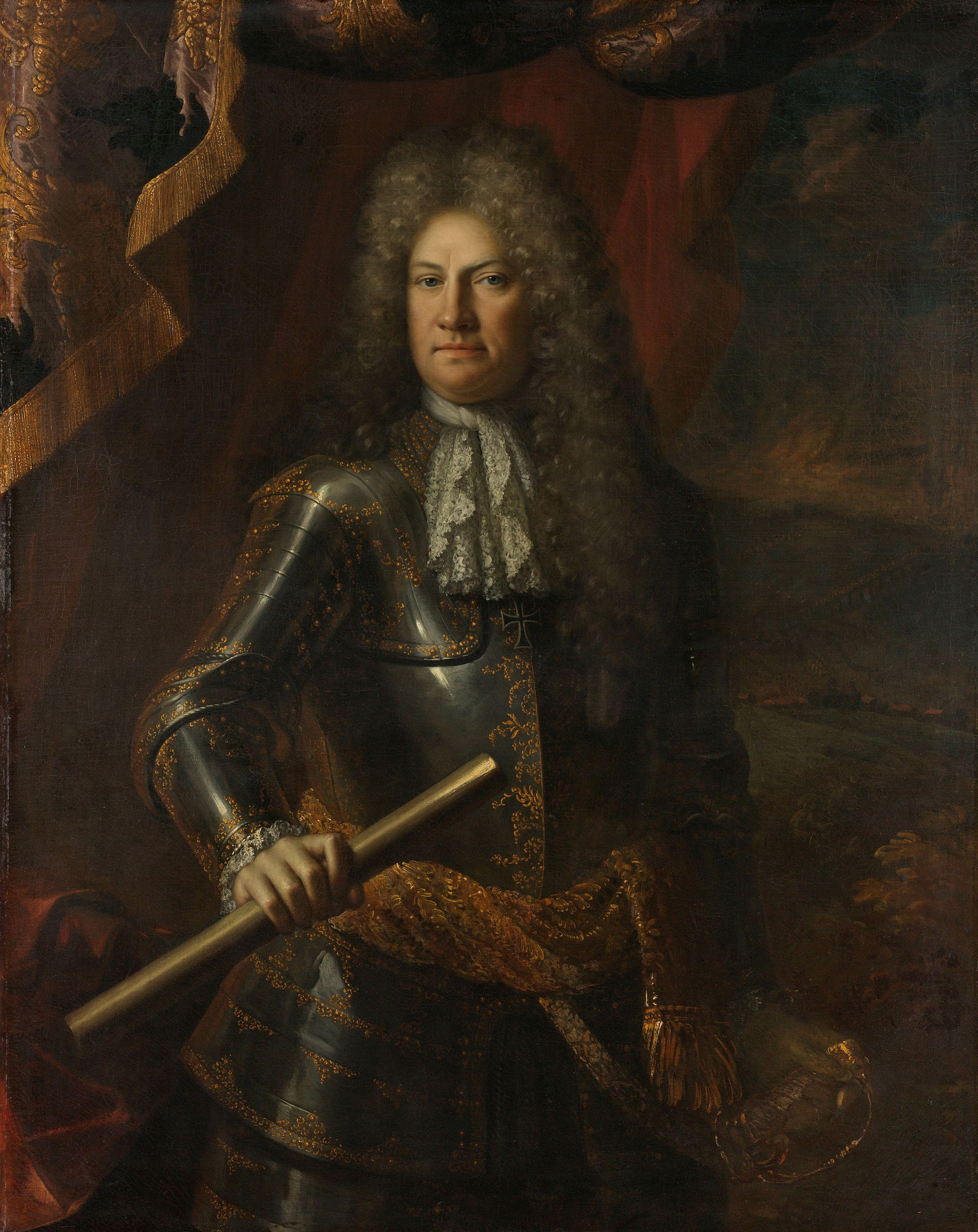
Portrait of Lieutenant-General Godert de Ginkel in 1690, by Adriaen van der Werff.

He took command in Ireland in the spring of 1691, and established his headquarters at Mullingar. Among those who held a command under him was the Marquis of Ruvigny, the recognised chief of the Huguenot refugees. Early in June, Ginkel took the fortress of Ballymore, capturing the whole garrison of 1,000 men. The Williamites lost only eight men. After reconstructing the fortifications of Ballymore, the army marched to Athlone, then one of the most important of the fortified towns of Ireland and key to the Jacobite defensive position, as it bridged the River Shannon. The Irish defenders of the place were commanded by a distinguished French general, the Marquis de St Ruth. The firing began on 19 June, and on 30 June the town was stormed, the Irish army retreating towards Galway, and took up their next defensive position at Aughrim. Having strengthened the fortifications of Athlone and having left a garrison there, Ginkel led the combined Williamite forces, on 8 July, westward in pursuit of the retreating army and met the Jacobite force in formal battle on 12 July 1691 at Aughrim.

The subsequent battle all but decided the war in the Williamites' favour. An immediate attack was resolved, and, after a severe and at one point doubtful contest, the Jacobite position was severely weakened by the death of their French commander Charles Chalmot de Saint-Ruhe, Marquis de Saint Ruth, after which his disorganised forces fled in the ensuing darkness of the early morning of 13 July. The battle was described as "quite possibly the bloodiest battle ever fought in the British Isles", with historians generally agreeing that roughly 5,000–7,000 men were killed during the battle; Ginkel recorded that 526 Jacobite prisoners of all ranks were captured. While Ginkel had promised Jacobite commander William Dorrington that all captives would be treated as prisoners of war, general officers were instead taken to the Tower of London as prisoners of state while the majority of the rank and file were imprisoned on Lambay Island where many died of disease and starvation.

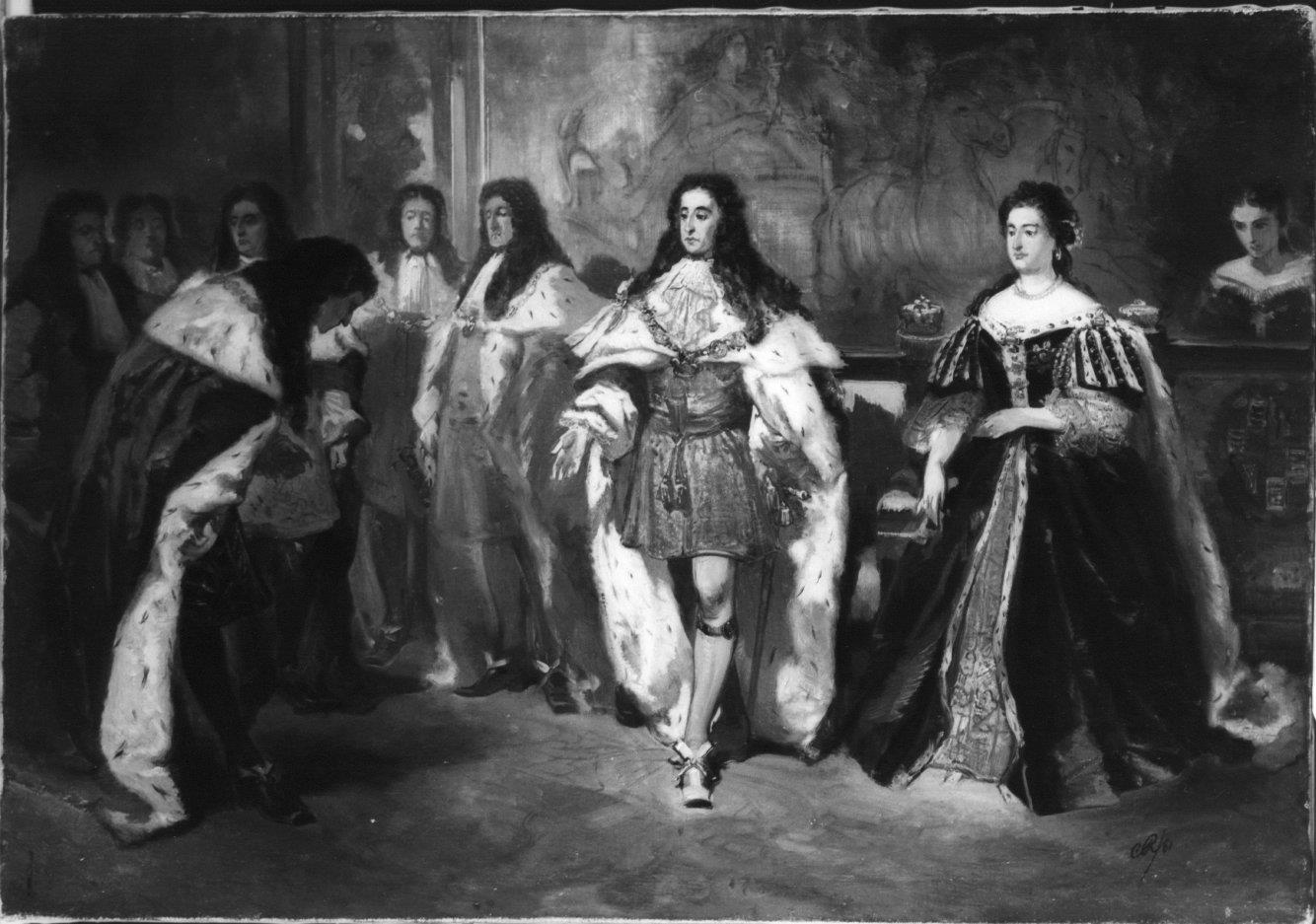
William III makes Ginkel Earl of Athlone for his services. 19th century depiction.

Galway next capitulated, its garrison being permitted to retire to Limerick. There the viceroy Tyrconnell was in command of a large force, but his sudden death early in August left the command in the hands of General Patrick Sarsfield, 1st Earl of Lucan, and the Frenchman d'Usson. Led by Ginkel, the Williamites came in sight of the town on the day of Tyrconnell's death, and the bombardment and siege were immediately begun. Ginkel, by a bold device, crossed the River Shannon and captured the camp of the Irish cavalry. A few days later he stormed the fort on Thomond Bridge, and after difficult negotiations, a capitulation was signed—the Treaty of Limerick, the terms of which were divided into a civil and a military treaty.

Thus was completed the Williamite conquest of Ireland, and the services of the Dutch general were amply recognised and rewarded. Ginkel received the formal thanks of the House of Commons, and was created by the king 1st Earl of Athlone and baron of Aughrim. The immense forfeited estates of the Earl of Limerick were given to him, but the grant was a few years later revoked by the English Parliament.

=== Back in the Low Countries ===
Soon after, he returned to the field, witnessing the capture of Namur by Louis XIV. On 3 August 1692, he fought at Steenkerke. The following year, he led the cavalry on the Allied left wing at the Battle of Landen, narrowly escaping death by drowning in the Geete while trying to restore order during the retreat. Athlone lamented that his cavalry, who fought the least at that battle, suffered most of its losses to a small river.

During the 1695 campaign, he commanded the Dutch cavalry in the army, earning great renown for his role in the recapture of Namur. Early the next spring, he devised the plan for the attack on Givet and supported Coehoorn's operation, which led to the destruction of French supply depots amassed by Louis XIV for the upcoming campaign.

== War of the Spanish Succession ==
In 1702, the Dutch Republic found itself once again at war with France. The death of William III made it necessary to appoint a new commander-in-chief. John William Friso, at just 14 years old, was too young for the role. While the army had many experienced and capable generals, like Athlone, none possessed the stature or authority that could even remotely rival the prestige of the late Stadtholder-King. For the Dutch army, his death was therefore seen as an outright disaster. The highest-ranking general at the time was the 67-year-old Field Marshal Walrad of Nassau-Usingen, who was consequently assigned command. He was not a famous commander, but not incompetent either, and he was certainly not lacking in military experience.

In April, Nassau-Usingen led an army to besiege Kaiserswerth, a town located on the eastern edge of the Republic. Athlone commanded a division near Rozendaal, while Menno van Coehoorn oversaw the forces in Flanders and Tilly was positioned with a division near Xanten. The strategy called for Athlone and Coehoorn to launch diversionary actions to prevent the French from coming to Kaiserswerth's aid. However, due to various difficulties and tensions between the commanders, who were reluctant to accept Nassau-Usingen's authority, the diversions ultimately failed to materialize.

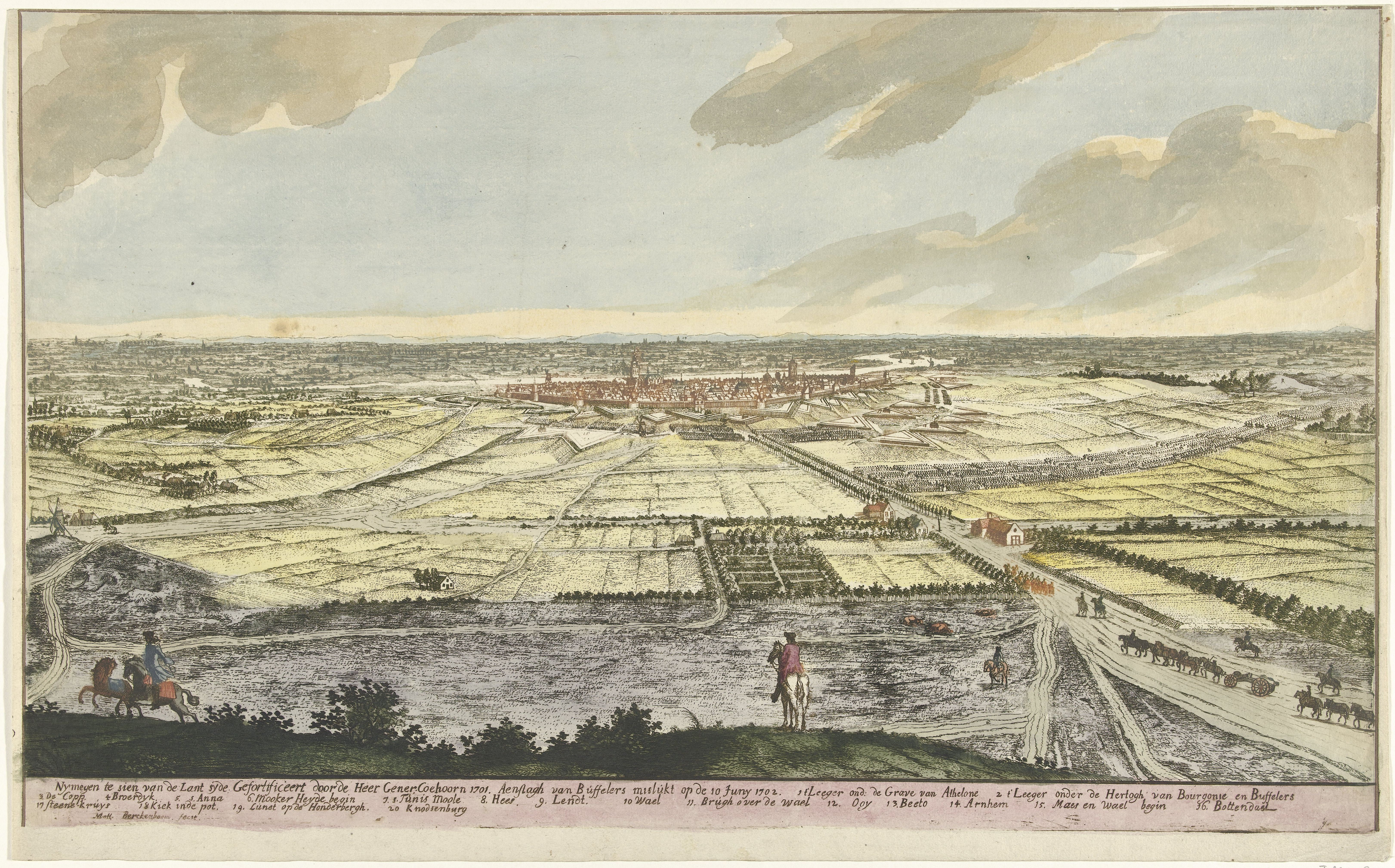
View of Nijmegen in 1702 during the stand-off between the two armies.

As a result, the situation began to shift in favor of the French. This led to criticism of the leadership of Athlone and Coehoorn. There was now a real danger that the French could sever the besieging army at Kaiserswerth by attacking Tilly's division. In response, Nassau-Usingen ordered Athlone to join forces with Tilly to prevent this from happening. When Boufflers, the French commander, realized this, he attempted to overwhelm and defeat Tilly with superior numbers before Athlone could reinforce him. However, Tilly managed to withdraw without suffering any losses. After Athlone joined forces with Tilly, they positioned their combined forces near Nijmegen to cover Nassau-Usingen's besieging army. Boufflers, delayed by logistical issues, remained inactive for a time. However, on 10 August, he advanced towards Nijmegen, intent on forcing Athlone into battle. Had Boufflers taken Nijmegen, he could have breached the Republic's defenses, possibly shifting the war decisively in France's favour. However, Athlone withdrew his smaller force to Nijmegen in good order and repelled the attack on Nijmegen, preventing a catastrophic outcome.

Meanwhile, the Duke of Marlborough arrived in the Dutch Republic. The close call at Nijmegen had caused significant unrest among the Dutch regenten, and they were now determined to take decisive action. In response, they resolved to raise a substantial field army and to make a final decision on who would command the combined Anglo-Dutch forces. During a conference on June 25, it was decided to appoint Marlborough as commander-in-chief. While he had limited military experience, the confidence that William III had previously placed in him, along with the strategic belief that his appointment would further solidify England's commitment to the war on the continent, ultimately outweighed other considerations.

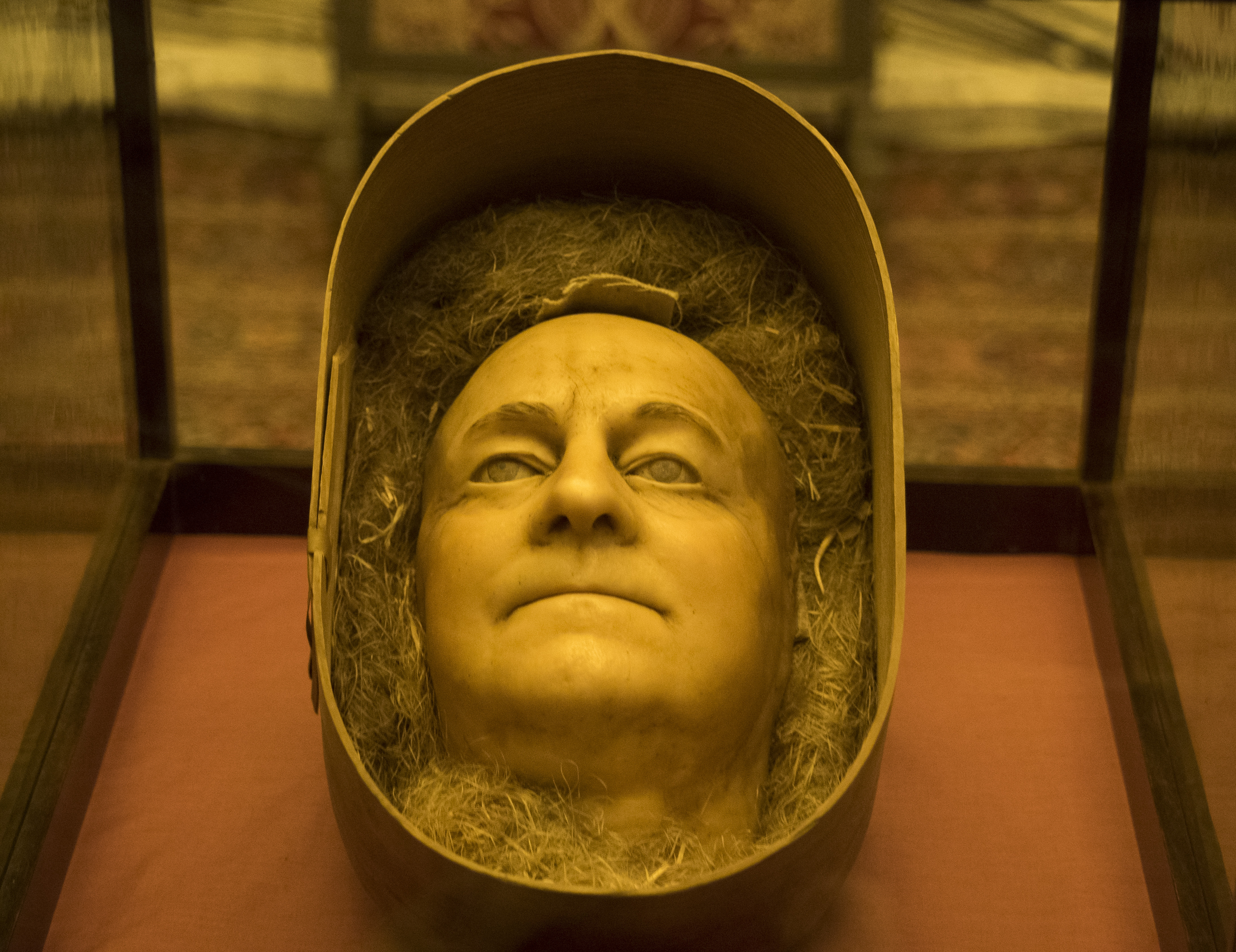
Death mask of Godert de Ginkel, at Amerongen Castle.

The Prince of Nassau-Usingen refused to serve under Marlborough, while Athlone, encouraged by the other Dutch generals, made efforts to secure an equivalent position to Marlborough. The regenten agreed with Athlone that Marlborough was a lightweight compared to him and, although Athlone officially remained subordinate, they strongly limited Marlborough's power over the army. Marlborough had to coordinate all his plans with Athlone. In cases of disagreement, Marlborough could not push through his plan; instead, the Dutch deputies had to make the final decision.

In the summer of 1702, Marlborough and Athlone led an offensive with 68,000 troops to re-establish the link to the isolated Maastricht. The Allies successfully captured Venlo, Stevensweert, and Roermond, ultimately concluding the campaign with the capture of Liège. When Nassau-Usingen died in October 1702, Athlone was officially promoted to Field Marshal of the Dutch troops. However, he died just four months later, before the start of the 1703 campaign. This created another complex dilemma for the Dutch regenten. Both Obdam and Nassau-Ouwerkerk were eligible to succeed Athlone. However, after Obdam fell out of favour following the Battle of Ekeren, it was Nassau-Ouwerkerk who was appointed to the position in 1704.

== Private life ==
Ginkel married Ursula Philipota van Raesvelt, heiress of Castle Middachten near Arnhem, and with her had several children.

He was succeeded, in 1703 upon his death, by his eldest son Frederick Christiaan van Reede, the 2nd earl (1668–1719), a distinguished soldier in the reigns of William III and Queen Anne and who had been naturalised as an English subject in 1696.

On the death of the 9th Earl of Athlone without issue in 1844, however, the title expired. It was, however, created again on two more occasions in 1890 and 1917.

== See also ==
- List of people on the postage stamps of Ireland
- Williamite War in Ireland

== Sources ==
- Blok, P.J.; Molhuysen, P.C. (1914). "Reede-ginckel, Godard, baron van". Nieuw Nederlandsch biografisch woordenboek. Deel 3.
- Falkner, James (2007). Marlborough's sieges. Spellmount.
- Nimwegen, Olaf van (1995). De subsistentie van het leger: Logistiek en strategie van het Geallieerde en met name het Staatse leger tijdens de Spaanse Successieoorlog in de Nederlanden en het Heilige Roomse Rijk (1701-1712) [The subsistence of the Allied and especially the Dutch army during the War of the Spanish Succession] (Thesis) (in Dutch). Universiteit Utrecht.
- Nimwegen, Olaf van (2020). De Veertigjarige Oorlog 1672–1712: de strijd van de Nederlanders tegen de Zonnekoning [The Forty Years War 1672–1712: the Dutch struggle against the Sun King] (in Dutch). Prometheus. ISBN 978-9-0446-3871-4.
- Wijn, J.W. (1956). Het Staatsche Leger: Deel VIII-1 Het tijdperk van de Spaanse Successieoorlog 1702–1705 (The Dutch States Army: Part VIII-1 The era of the War of the Spanish Succession 1702–1705) (in Dutch). Martinus Nijhoff.
- "Margaretha Turnor: Mijn heer en lieste hartge" [Margaretha Turnor: My lord and dearest heart]. ntroerendgoed.kasteelamerongen.nl (in Dutch). 12 June 2025.

Peerage of Ireland
New creation	Earl of Athlone; 1st creation 1692–1703	Succeeded by Frederick Christiaan van Reede, 2nd Earl of Athlone
Dutch nobility
Preceded by Godard Adriaan van Reede	Baron van Reede; 1644–1703	Succeeded by Frederick Christiaan van Reede, 2nd Earl of Athlone
