= Siege of Namur (1695) =

1695 siege of the Nine Years' War

- Part of the Nine Years' War
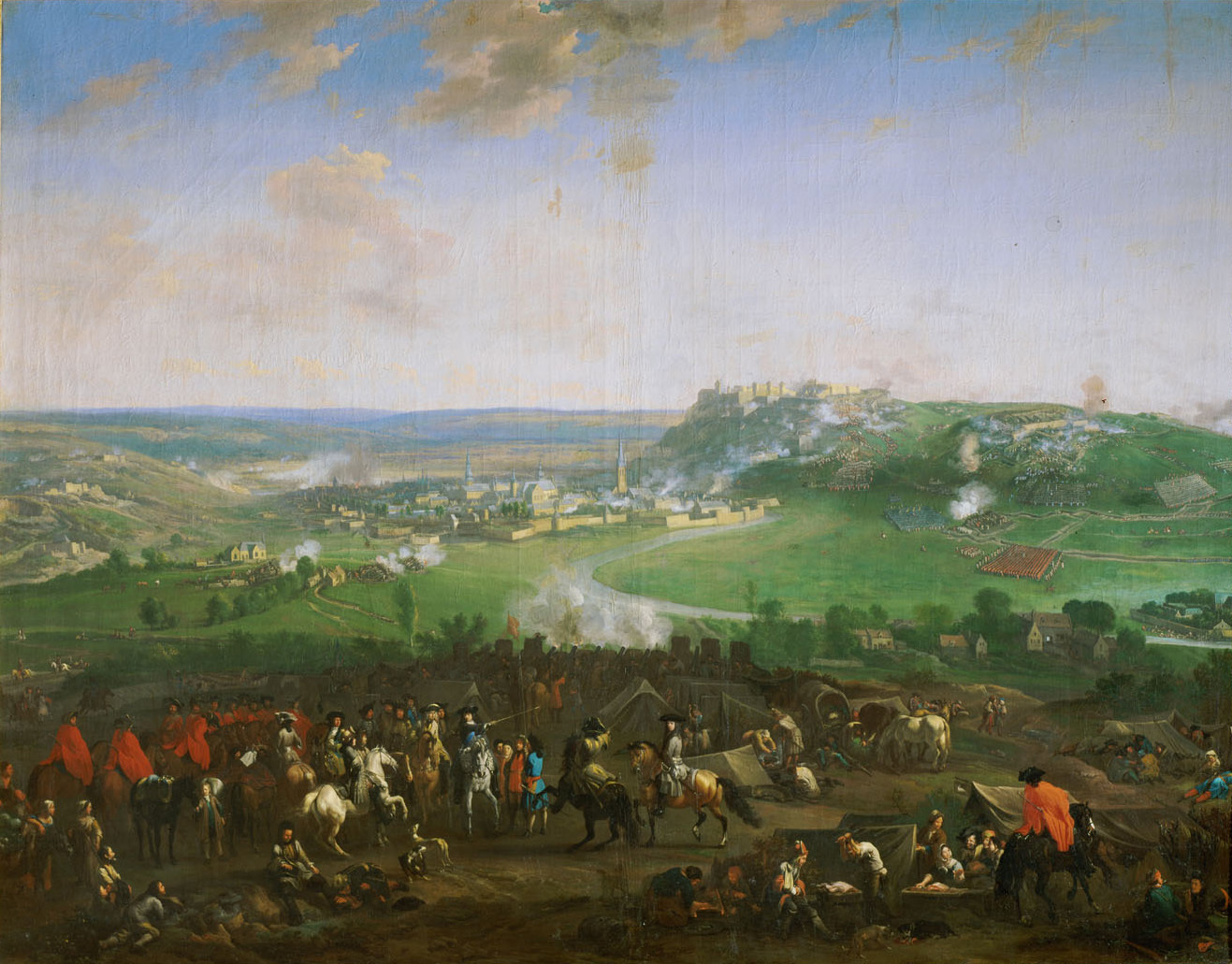
- Painting of the siege by Jan van Huchtenburg
Date	2 July – 4 September 1695 (Note: Dates are per the Gregorian rather than the Julian calendar then used in Britain which was ten days behind.) (2 months and 2 days)
Location	Namur, Spanish Netherlands (Present-day Belgium); 50°28′N 04°52′E
Result	Grand Alliance victory

Belligerents
Kingdom of France	Dutch Republic; Kingdom of England; Kingdom of Scotland; Holy Roman Empire

Commanders and leaders
(Kingdom of France) Duc de Boufflers (Kingdom of France) Duc de Villeroi (Kingdom of France) Count Guiscard	(Dutch Republic) (Kingdom of England) (Kingdom of Scotland) William of Orange (Dutch Republic) Menno van Coehoorn (Dutch Republic) Earl of Athlone (Holy Roman Empire) Maximilian of Bavaria (Holy Roman Empire) Frederick of Prussia (Holy Roman Empire) Prince Vaudémont

Strength
13,000–16,000 men French field army under Villeroi; 100,000–110,000 men	80,000 men Covering army under Vaudemont and William; 50,000 men and during the siege of the citadel 85,000 men

Casualties and losses
8,000	18,000

The siege of Namur (also known as the second siege of Namur) took place during the Nine Years' War between 2 July and 4 September 1695. Its capture by the French in the 1692 siege and recapture by the Grand Alliance in 1695 are often viewed as the defining events of the war; the second siege is considered to be William III's most significant military success during the war.

== Background ==
The 1695 Flanders campaign; key locations

Namur was divided into the 'City,' with the residential and commercial areas, and the Citadel that controlled access to the rivers Sambre and Meuse. In 1692, the Dutch military engineer Menno van Coehoorn made the Citadel one of the strongest defensive points in Flanders, but the garrison had less than 5,000 soldiers, many of them poorly trained Spanish troops with low morale. While the outer City fell relatively quickly, capturing the Citadel took the French over a month and they were nearly forced to withdraw by torrential rain and sickness. This was partly due to the terms negotiated for surrendering the City; van Coehoorn agreed not to fire on the City from the Citadel, in return for the French agreeing not to attack him from that direction, making it almost impregnable. After its capture, Namur's defences were significantly improved by Vauban.

After 1693, Louis XIV followed a largely defensive strategy in Flanders. French victories at Steinkirk and Landen and the capture of Namur, Mons, Huy and Charleroi failed to force the Dutch Republic out of the war. The cost had exhausted the French economy, with crop failures in 1693 and 1694 causing widespread famine in France and Northern Italy.

The Dutch Republic remained intact and the Alliance held together under William through four years of war. Their losses were damaging but not terminal; in 1694, they had recaptured towns like Huy and Diksmuide, and by 1695 held a numerical advantage for the first time. The Allies had also reached the limit of their resources. The 1690s marked the lowest point of the Little Ice Age, a period of cold and wet weather affecting Europe in the second half of the 17th century. Spain and Scotland in particular experienced famine; the harvest failed in 1695, 1696, 1698 and 1699 and an estimated 5–15 per cent of the population starved to death.

While this theatre is commonly referred to as Flanders, most campaigning took place in the Spanish Netherlands, a compact area 160 km (99 mi) wide, the highest point only 100 m (330 ft) above sea level, and dominated by canals and rivers. In the 17th century, goods and supplies were largely transported by water and the war was fought for control of rivers such as the Lys, Sambre and Meuse.

Retaking Namur became the key objective for 1695 as its location between the Sambre and Meuse made it a vital part of the "Barrier" system. This was a chain of fortresses in the Spanish Netherlands the Dutch viewed as essential for defence against French invasion and possession would be extremely advantageous in any peace negotiations.

The French commander in Flanders, Marshal Luxembourg, died in January 1695 and was replaced by the less talented Villeroi. French strategy for 1695 was to remain on the defensive and Boufflers spent April constructing entrenchments between the rivers Scheldt and Lys, from Coutrai/Kortrijk to Avelgem. William marched on these in June with the bulk of the Allied force but secretly detached Frederick of Prussia to Namur. Once Frederick was in place on 2 July, William joined him; the Allies were now split into a besieging force of 58,000 at Namur and a field army of 102,000 under Prince Vaudémont to cover Villeroi.

== Siege ==
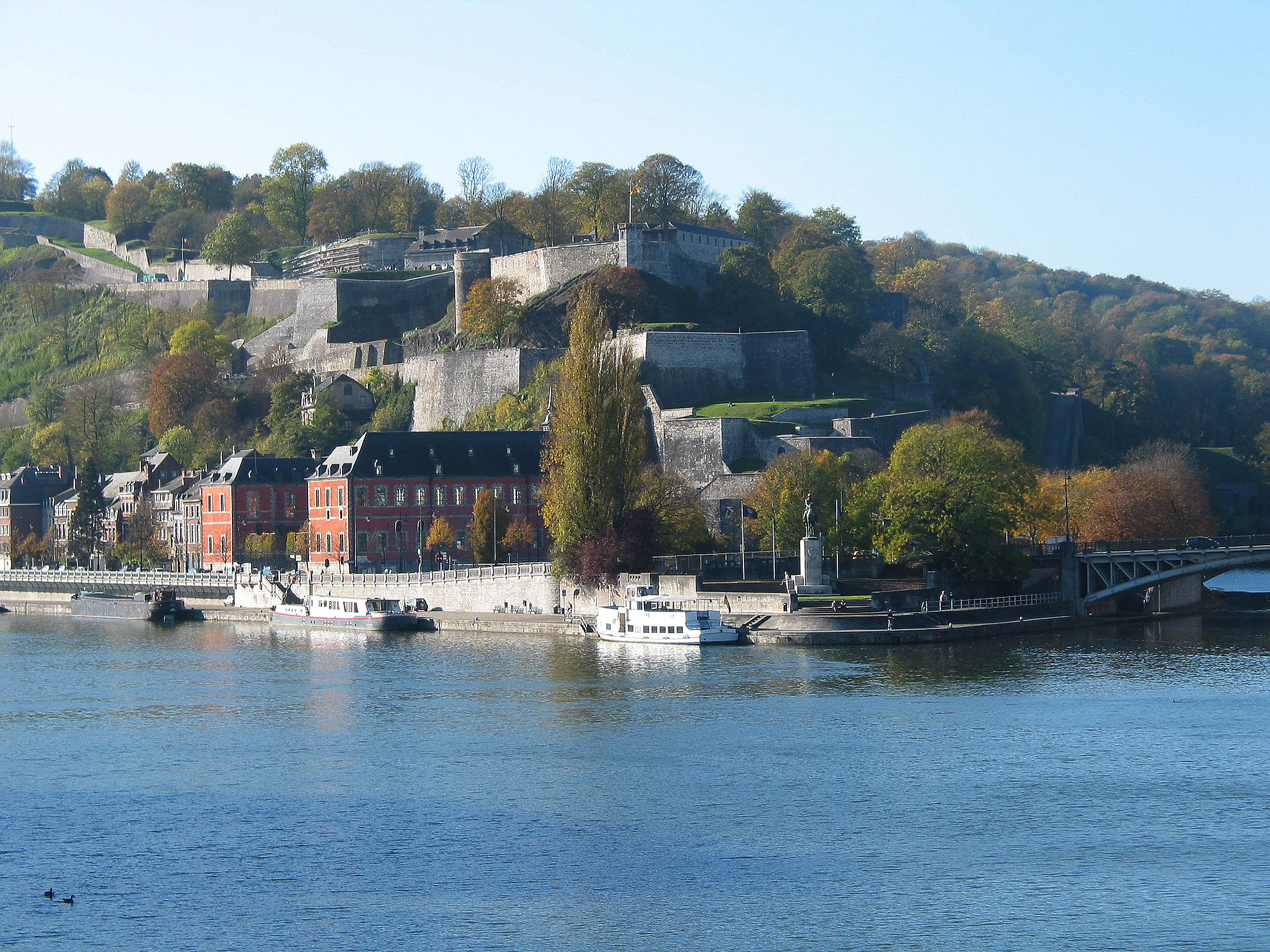
Citadel of Namur above the Meuse, modern Parlement de Wallonie below

On 2 July the Earl of Athlone had unexpectedly surrounded Namur with the cavalry. Although this was a surprise to the French, Boufflers had a garrison of 13,000-16,000 men, making a siege a formidable challenge. After Athlone's action, the circumvallation line was soon completed. When the artillery equipment arrived, on 12 June, the Brandenburgers, from across the Meuse River, opened the artillery fire on the City; the next day, the Dutch started it on the St Nicolas Gate side, with Major General Fagel being wounded in the neck by a musket ball. While on 18 July the French launched an assault on the position of Brandenburg's General-Field Marshal Heino Heinrich Graf von Flemming, the Dutch under Major General Ernst Wilhelm von Salisch captured three detached bastions and forts outside the St Nicholas Gate and, with sword in hand, drove the French into the city itself. The losses on both sides were heavy.

On 27 June, William III personally led a successful attack of 400 Dutch and English grenadiers on the counterscarp. At the same time, the Maximilian of Bavaria took possession of an abbey, from which he forced over 300 dragoons into the Citadel. After the capture of the line Vauban had built between the Meuse and Sambre rivers in the rocks, and further Allied successes, the French decided to surrender the city. After 4 August only the Citadel was still in French hands. Half the French garrison had been lost. Count Guiscard, the Governor of Namur, asked for a truce to allow the French to withdraw to the Citadel, which was accepted and the siege resumed after six days. A siege of the Citadel could not be proceeded with immediately due to a lack of money to pay the workers.

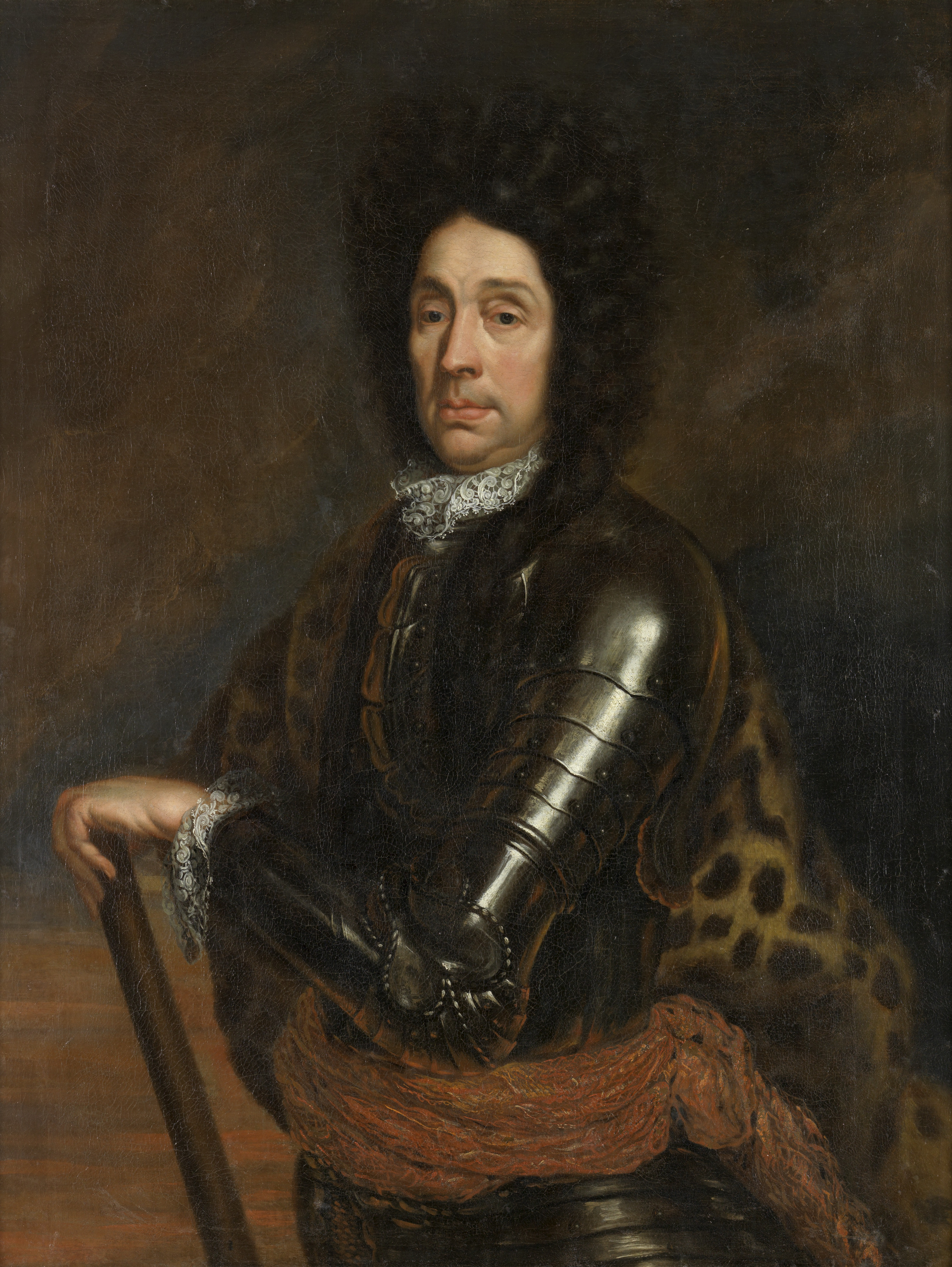
Menno van Coehoorn

Vaudémont's role was to keep his field army between Villeroi and Namur, while Villeroi tried to tempt him out of position by attacking Allied-held towns like Knokke and Beselare, now Zonnebeke. (Note: This area was devastated during the 1914–1818 War and the original villages obliterated.) Vaudémont refused to be drawn since both sides knew the longer the siege went on, the more likely Namur was to fall. Villeroi's attempts to out-manoeuvre Vaudémont were unsuccessful, despite the capture of Diksmuide and Deinze in late July with 6,000–7,000 prisoners. The Bombardment of Brussels between 13–15 August also failed to divert the Allies, despite destroying large parts of the commercial centre; Constantijn Huygens, William's Secretary for Dutch affairs, visited Brussels on 11 September and recorded that the 'ruin caused...was horrible...and in many places, the houses reduced to rubble.'

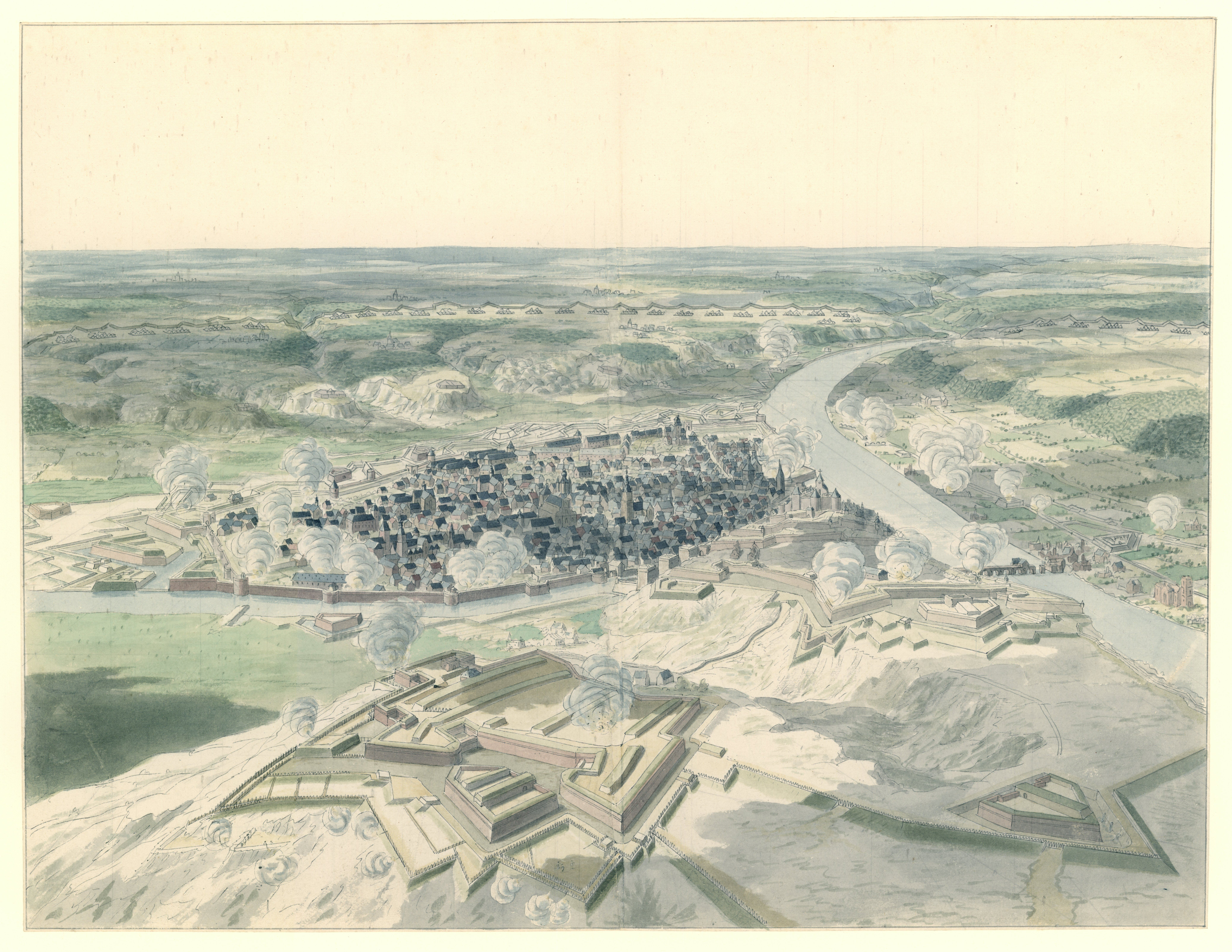
Namur during the siege, by Dirk Maas

By mid-August, the Citadel was largely intact, Villeroi was making resupply much more difficult, while the besiegers were beginning to lose men to disease, in an age when far more soldiers died from illness than in battle. The Allies were running out of time and Coehoorn and William now agreed a new approach; a battery of 200 guns was established in Namur city and on 21 August began a continuous 24-hour bombardment of the Citadel's lower defences. Boufflers later told Louis it was 'the most prodigious artillery ever assembled' and by 26 August the Allies were ready to assault the Citadel. At midnight on 27th, Villeroi finally made contact with William but his numerical advantage of 105,000 to 85,000 was offset by the strongly entrenched Allied positions. Having failed to outflank the Allied lines, Villeroi retreated and William gave the order for a general assault.

The assaults by the Allies were extremely bloody, that of 30 August alone costing 3,000 men in less than three hours but the defenders were eventually forced back to their final lines of defence. Count Guiscard, now commanding the key outwork of Fort Orange, told Boufflers on 2 September they could not repulse another attack and the garrison surrendered on 4 September, having suffered 8,000 casualties to the Allies' 18,000.

== Aftermath ==
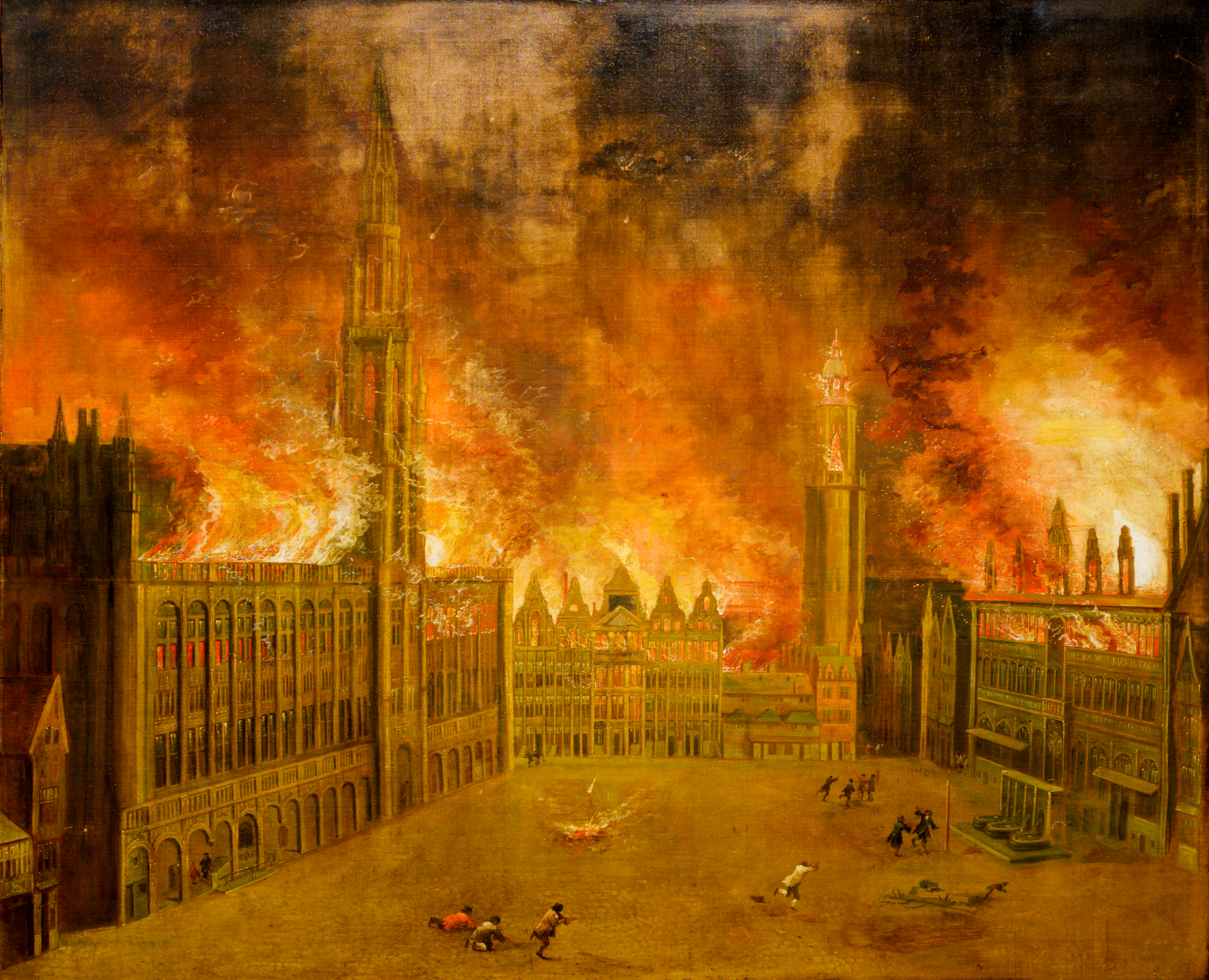
The Bombardment of Brussels; the deliberate destruction of a non-military target shocked many in Europe, where all sides were tired of the war's cost.

The recapture of Namur was a major achievement for the Allies but Bouffler's energetic defence prevented them taking advantage of French weakness elsewhere, an achievement recognised by Louis promoting him to Field-Marshal. Due to a monetary crisis in England and the Bombardment of Givet neither side was capable of mounting an offensive in 1696 and serious fighting came to an end, although Louis made one final demonstration prior to the signing of the Treaty of Ryswick in September 1697.

Namur was an example Coehoorn's offensive tactics and also the defensive precepts set out in his 1685 work New Fortress Construction or Nieuwe Vestingbouw op een natte of lage horisont. These can be summarised as passive reliance on fortifications was not enough and in trying to hold an entire town, defenders simply risked losing it very quickly. This meant dividing fortifications into inner (Citadel) and outer (City) and conducting an 'active' defence that used constant counter attacks to keep the besiegers off guard. Bouffler applied these concepts but risked his defence by committing too many troops to the outer City without means of retreat.

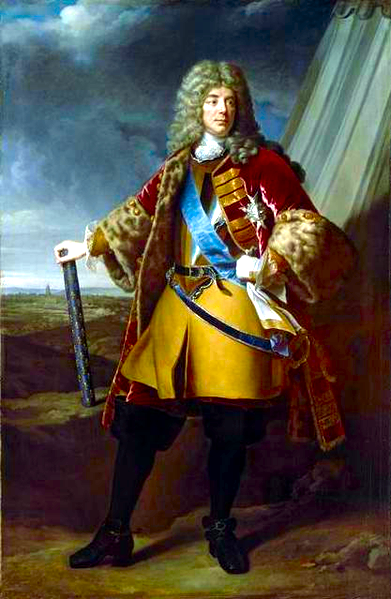
De Villeroi, Luxembourg's successor as French commander in Flanders.

He applied these lessons at the siege of Lille in 1708. Historian John Lynn summarised his defence of Namur,

(He) demonstrated one could effectively win a campaign by losing a fortress, provided you pinned down and exhausted the besieging force in the process. He conducted a classic active defence, launching attacks by the garrison on the enemy's siege works, contesting every advance as best he could.

Prisoners were normally exchanged as soon as possible, partly because neither side wanted the expense of having to feed them. On this occasion, the French refused William's request for the return of the 6,000–7,000 troops captured at Diksmuide and Deinze due to a dispute over the terms of their surrender. By now, shortage of manpower was a problem for all combatants; many of the rank and file were forcibly enlisted into French regiments and sent to fight in Italy or Spain. Desertion from one army to another to receive a signing-on bonus was common, particularly as these were paid immediately and wages were often months in arrears. As recruiters were paid for each man they enlisted, several thousand additional soldiers represented significant profits for the French officers involved. In retaliation, despite the garrison of Namur being allowed to surrender on terms, Boufflers was taken prisoner and released only when the remaining Allied prisoners had been returned in September.

== Legacy ==
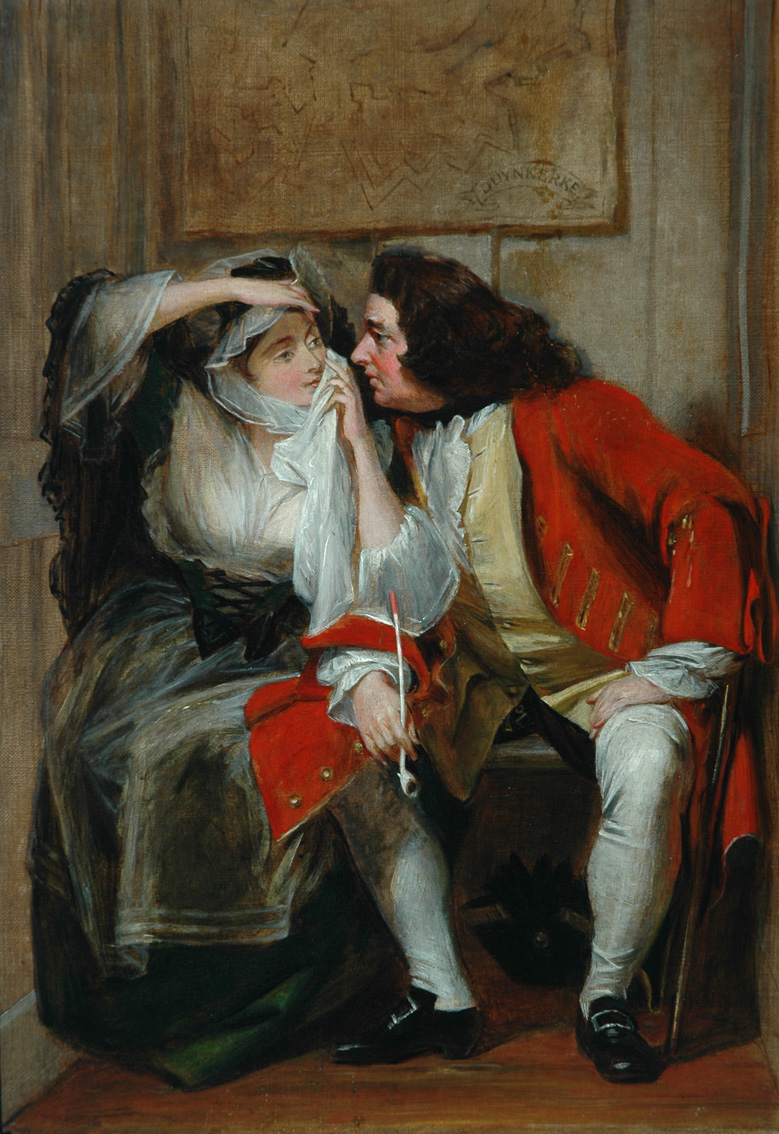
My Uncle Toby and the Widow Wadman by Charles Robert Leslie, 1831. In the novel Tristram Shandy, Uncle Toby frequently recounts the siege in the novel.

While the Bombardment of Brussels failed to distract the Allies, some see it as marking the end of a period where the dominant form of warfare was taking or holding fortifications. By demonstrating fortified towns could no longer resist the massive firepower available in modern warfare, it led to a move away from siege warfare and into the direct confrontations advocated by Marlborough and others in the War of the Spanish Succession.

The two sieges of Namur were a huge media spectacle. There are few examples in early modern history where the media commented so extensively, so diversely on military events. In the Dutch Republic, France and England many eulogies, illustrations, maps and medals related to the sieges were produced and newspapers wrote about the events in great detail. Although much of this was done on the publicists' initiative, it was also encouraged by the state. This way, the governments hoped that the public remained engaged and convinced of the war effort and that it would make their allies more confident, while reducing the enemy's morale. William and Louis also saw all the publicity as an opportunity to enhance their reputation. The assault by 3,000 British troops on the Terra Nova earthwork on 31 August spearheaded by 700 grenadiers is alleged to have been the inspiration for the song "The British Grenadiers".

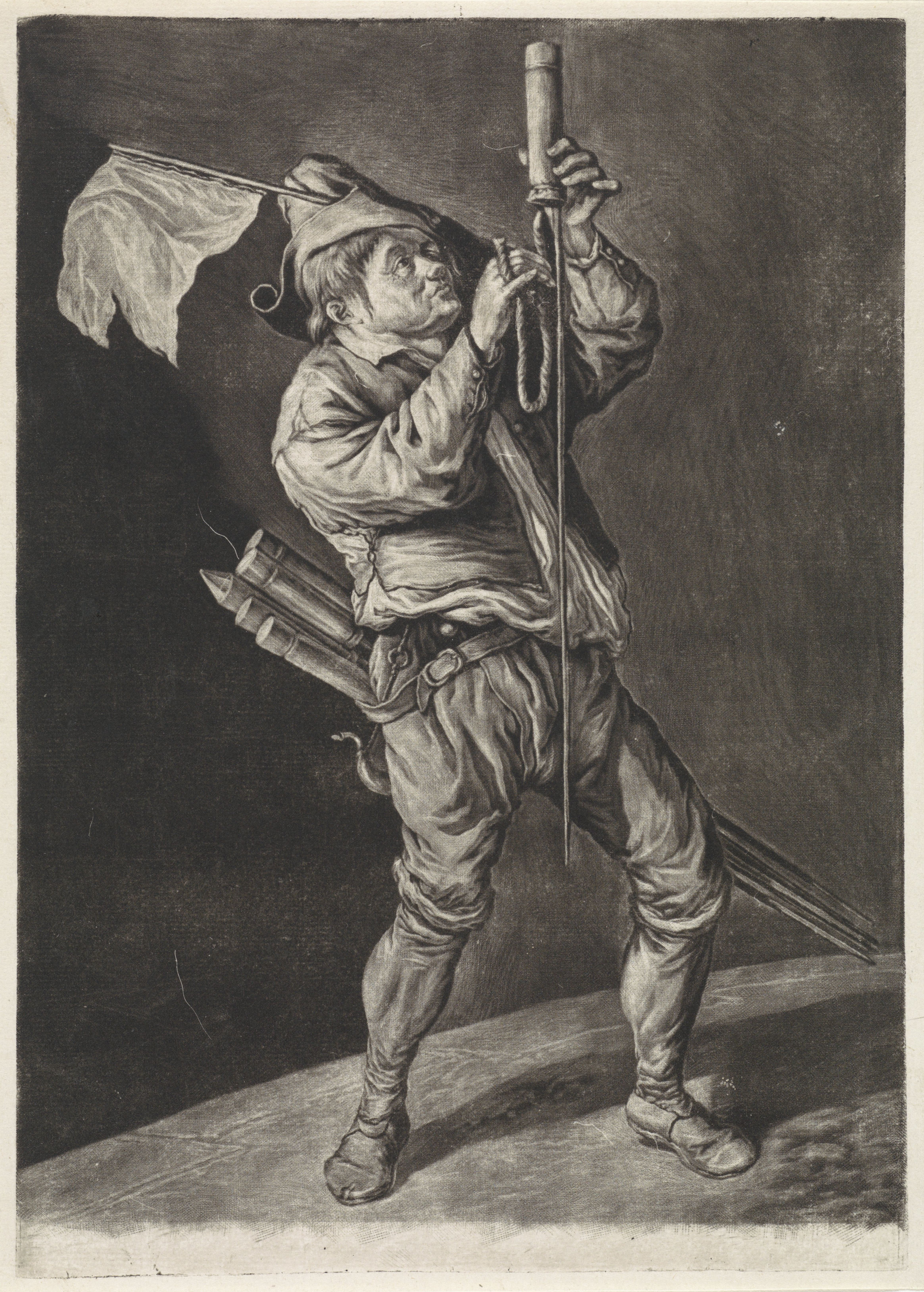
A Dutch illustration showing a man celebrating the capture of Namur in 1695 by setting off fireworks

The siege and its aftermath is the centre of the novel Mother Ross; an Irish Amazon by G. R. Lloyd. This is a revision of Daniel Defoe's original that purports to be the story of Christian "Kit" Cavanagh alias Christian Davies, an Irish woman who enlisted in the British Army in 1693 disguised as a man and was present at the siege. Defoe claims to have met her in old age when she was a Chelsea Pensioner; it contains a number of factual errors but is an interesting and rare observation of the siege from the rank and file.

Laurence Sterne's 1760 novel The Life and Opinions of Tristram Shandy, Gentleman refers to events from the Nine Years' War, including Namur where Tristram's uncle Toby suffered an unspecified "groin injury". He and his trusted servant Corporal Trim build a replica of the battle in his garden which he shows to his fiancée, Widow Wadman, among others. The Widow tries to determine how serious Toby's injury is before committing to marriage but he avoids her questions by providing increasingly elaborate accounts of the siege. This episode and Toby's reconstruction appear in the 2006 film A Cock and Bull Story.

Fourteen British regiments earned a battle honour for "Namur 1695" including the Grenadier, Coldstream and Scots Guards, the Royal Scots, the King's Own Scottish Borderers, the Royal Irish Regiment, the Royal Welch Fusiliers, the Royal Warwickshire Fusiliers, the Queen's Royal Regiment (West Surrey), the East Yorkshire Regiment and the West Yorkshire Regiment, the King's Own Royal Regiment and the King's Own Royal Border Regiment.

== Sources ==
- Brewer, E. Cobham (1898). Dictionary of Phrase and Fable, giving the Derivation, Source, or Origin of common Phrases, Allusions, and Words that have a tale to Tell. London: Cassell. OCLC 6576462.
- Childs, John (1991). The Nine Years' War and the British Army, 1688–1697: The Operations in the Low Countries. Manchester University Press. ISBN 978-0719089961.
- Bright, James Pierce (2016) [1836]. A History of England;Volume III. Palala Press. ISBN 978-1358568602.
- de la Colonie, Jean-Martin (1904) [First published 1737 in French]. The Chronicles of an Old Campaigner M. de la Colonie, 1692–1717. Translated by Horsley, Walter C. London: John Murray.
- Dekker, Rudolf M. (2013). Family, Culture and Society in the Diary of Constantijn Huygens Jr, Secretary to Stadholder-King William of Orange. Brill. ISBN 978-9004250949.
- Hume, David (1848). The History of England 1609–1714.
- Lenihan, Padraig (2011). "Namur Citadel, 1695: A Case Study in Allied Siege Tactics". War in History. 18 (3): 1. doi:10.1177/0968344511401296. hdl:10379/6195. S2CID 159682220.
- Lloyd, G. R. (2012). Mother Ross: An Irish Amazon (Rewrite of the Daniel Defoe book ed.). AuthorHouseUK. ISBN 978-1477219348.
- White, I. D. (2011). "Rural Settlement 1500–1770". In Lynch, Michael (ed.). The Oxford Companion to Scottish History. Oxford University Press. ISBN 978-0199693054.
- Lynn, John (1999). The Wars of Louis XIV, 1667-1714 (Modern Wars In Perspective). Longman. ISBN 978-0582056299.
- Manning, Roger (2006). An Apprenticeship in Arms; the Origins of the British Army 1585-1701. London: OUP. ISBN 978-0199261499.
- Stapleton, John M (2007). "Prelude to Rijswijk: William III, Louis XIV, and the Strange Case of Marshal Boufflers". The Western Society of French History. 35. hdl:2027/spo.0642292.0035.006.
- Young, William (2004). International Politics and Warfare in the Age of Louis XIV. iUniverse. ISBN 978-0595329922.
- Haks, Donald (2013). Vaderland en Vrede 1672-1713: Publiciteit over de Nederlandse Republiek in oorlog [Fatherland and Peace 1672-1713: Publicity about the Dutch Republic at war] (in Dutch). Verloren. ISBN 978-90-8704-337-7.
- Wijn, J.W. (1950). Het Staatsche Leger: Deel VII (The Dutch States Army: Part VII) (in Dutch). Martinus Nijhoff.
- Bodart, Gaston (1908). Militär-historisches Kriegs-Lexikon (1618–1905).
- Van Nimwegen, Olaf (2020). De Veertigjarige Oorlog 1672–1712: de strijd van de Nederlanders tegen de Zonnekoning [The 40 Years' War 1672–1712: the Dutch struggle against the Sun King] (in Dutch). Prometheus. ISBN 978-90-446-3871-4.
