= Bombardment of Givet =

1696 bombardment during the Nine Years' War

- Part of the Nine Years' War
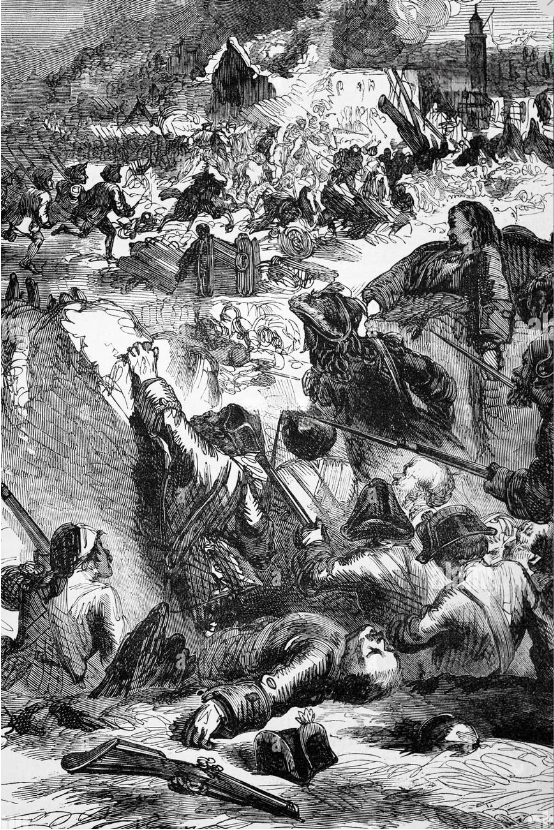
- 19th century depiction of the Bombardment of Givet
Date	16 March 1696
Location	Givet, Kingdom of France
Result	Allied (Dutch/British) victory

Belligerents
Dutch Republic; Kingdom of England; Kingdom of Scotland	France

Commanders and leaders
(Dutch Republic) Earl of Athlone (Dutch Republic) Menno van Coehoorn	Count of Guiscard

Strength
10,000–16,000	Unknown

Casualties and losses
light	3 to 4 million rations

The Bombardment of Givet took place during the Nine Years' War on 16 March 1696. A Dutch army under Menno van Coehoorn and the Earl of Athlone closed in on the French town of Givet with the aim of destroying the supplies held there. In this way, they hoped that the French would not be able to mount an offensive that year. The action was a success and prevented the French from launching a major offensive.

== Background ==
In the winter of 1695–1696, Louis XIV had come to the conclusion that he had been drawn into a war of attrition by the Maritime powers. One he could not win. He therefore initiated peace talks with William III. However, William only wanted to make peace after he had brought Louis to his knees. He and the Allied war planners had taken note of the war-weary French economy and planned to take the initiative in the upcoming campaign of 1696 despite their numerical inferiority.

This plan would not come to fruition. A monetary crisis in England destroyed the possibility of an Allied offensive. England paid much of the war effort, so this meant that William could not muster half of his army that year. The poor economic situation of the Allies became obvious to the French and enthusiasm for their peace initiatives ceased. The French would make one last effort in 1696 to be able to dictate peace to the Allies. An invasion of England was discarded after the Jacobite assassination plot on William was discovered. Instead they planned to go on the offensive in Spanish Netherlands whilst they would take on a defensive posture in Germany and Italy.

In military campaigns of that time, one of the main difficulties was feeding the troops. For this purpose, the supply depots that were assembled in the border fortresses before the troops took to the field were of particularly important. Taking or destroying these supply depots was therefore a significant advantage to the other party, because it prevented the enemy army from taking to the field; or, at least reduced the time it could stay in the field. It was with this in mind that the heads of the Allied armies in the Spanish Netherlands decided on a venture against the French supply depot at Givet, a fortress on the Meuse deep into enemy territory. The plan, according to historian Willem Jan Knoop, seems to have been conceived mainly by Athlone.

== Raid on Givet ==
1696 Flanders campaign; key locations

10,000 to 16,000 Dutch troops gathered at Namur. On 13 March, under the command of Ahtlone and Coehoorn, they left the city and marched towards Givet along the eastern bank of the Meuse. The march was difficult due to the poor condition of the roads and the need to cross the small river Lesse. As a result, Athlone had to leave its heavy artillery behind.

Athlone sealed off the nearby city off Dinant with most of the troops, while Coehoorn moved towards Givet with a small force. To avoid Fort de Charlemont, the fortress protecting Givet, Coehoorn remained on the eastern bank of the river. The Count de Guiscard, who was commanding the French troops in the region, had been convinced that the target of the Allied attack would be Dinant and had made his way to that city with some of his troops. He was thus in no position to prevent Coehoorn from bombarding Givet.

Coehoorn appeared before Givet on 15 March. The next day, at 7:00 am, his artillery opened fire on the town. Three hours later everything in the fortress situated on the eastern bank of the Meuse was ablaze. As the Dutch had no heavy artillery with them, it was impossible to set fire to the part of Givet on the other side bank of the Meuse, nor to Charlemont immediately adjacent to it; so the French supply store of oats was spared. According to French sources part of the supplies had also been transferred from the eastern bank of the Meuse to western bank when the garrison was informed of the Anglo-Dutch approach. The attack was nonetheless a great success - British troops entered the undefended Petit Givet and set fire to the barracks and weapons storehouses which was where the bulk of French supplies were gathered. More than 3 million rations were set on fire. In addition, many of the belongings of citizens of Dinant also went up in flames which they had evacuated to Givet.

At 16:00 Coehoorn ceased the bombardment and withdrew, unhindered, to the main force in front of Dinant. Athlone had meanwhile engaged in some light artillery and rifle fire with Guiscard's troops; the main objective being to prevent the French from coming to the aid of Givet or threatening Athlone's line of communication with Namur. After the arrival of Coehoorn the Dutch fell back along the Meuse towards Namur, with their rearguard holding back a weak sally from the French garrison of Dinant. Shortly afterwards, the French army made a move towards Namur, as it were in revenge for Givet, but this came to nothing.

== Aftermath ==
The attack on Givet would prove to be a great success for the Allies as it ruled out all French thoughts of launching a major offensive in 1696. Givet was also an important factor in persuading Louis that French fortunes were instead to be sought in the Americas, which would lead to the Raid on Cartagena de Indias next year. The British historian, John Childs, argued that 'Givet was the greatest strategic blow delivered by the Allies' and that it 'ranked only second to [the second Siege of] Namur; in its contribution to the coming peace.' The rest of the campaign saw no major actions.

William still hoped to take the initiative by laying siege to Charleroi, but Villeroi, the French commander, took advantage of the low number of Allied forces and moved deep into Flanders to Deinze with his army. This manoeuvre by the French army forced William to move into Flanders as well to protect its cities and Brussels. The rest of the year continued with inconclusive movements on both sides. The war in the Low Countries had approached a stalemate. Both sides were tired and too evenly matched to give each other a death blow. The next year the Allies secured the town of Deinze, while the French captured Ath, but this changed little strategically. The Peace of Ryswick was signed on 20 September 1697.

== Sources ==
- Childs, John (1991). The Nine Years' War and the British Army. Manchester University Press. ISBN 0-71903461-2.
- Knoop, Willem Jan (1895). Krijgs- en geschiedkundige beschouwingen over Willem den derde, 1672–1697: Volume 3 [Military and historical reflections on William the third, 1672–1697: Volume 3] (in Dutch). H. A. M. Roelants.
- Van Nimwegen, Olaf (2020). De Veertigjarige Oorlog 1672–1712: de strijd van de Nederlanders tegen de Zonnekoning [The Forty Years' War 1672–1712: the Dutch struggle against the Sun King] (in Dutch). Prometheus. ISBN 978-90-446-3871-4.
