= Frederick Christiaan van Reede, 2nd Earl of Athlone =

Dutch States Army officer, diplomat and nobleman

The Right Honourable The Earl of Athlone
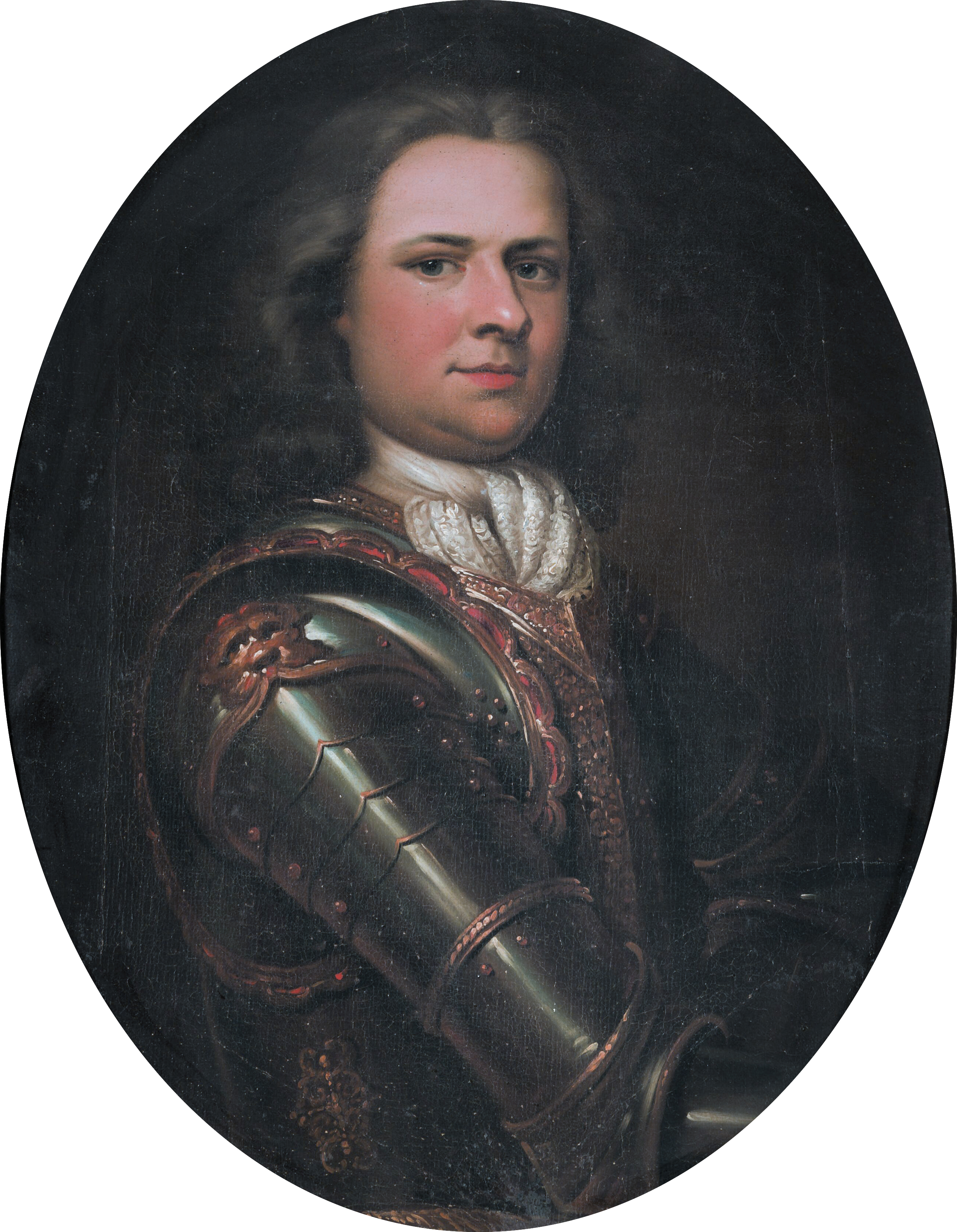
- Frederick Christiaan van Reede, 2nd Earl of Athlone

Personal details
- Born: 20 October 1668 Utrecht
- Died: 15 August 1719 (aged 50) Sluis
- Spouse: Henriette van Nassau-Zuylestein
- Parents: Godard van Reede, baron van Ginkel (father); Ursula Philippota van Raesfelt (mother)

Military service
- Allegiance: Dutch Republic
- Branch/service: Dutch States Army
- Years of service: 1691 – 1719
- Rank: Lieutenant General
- Battles/wars: Nine Years' War; Battle of Aughrim; War of the Spanish Succession; Actions near the Dyle; Battle of Ramillies; Battle of Oudenarde; Crossing of the Scheldt; Siege of Ghent; Battle of Malplaquet

Frederick Christiaan van Reede, 2nd Earl of Athlone (20 October 1668 – 15 August 1719) was a Dutch States Army officer, diplomat and nobleman who fought during the Nine Years' War and the War of the Spanish Succession.

== Life ==
=== Personal life ===
Frederick Christiaan was the son of Godard van Reede, baron van Ginkel and Ursula Philippota van Raesfelt. He married Henriette van Nassau-Zuylestein (a daughter of William Nassau de Zuylestein, 1st Earl of Rochford) in 1715. They had three children: Godard Adriaan van Reede, 3rd Earl of Athlone, Fredrik Willem van Reede, 4th Earl of Athlone, and Ursula Christina Reynira (baroness of Reede-Ginckel). He was a member of the Ridderschap of Utrecht (Note: The ridderschap of the province of Utrecht was the body that represented the nobility of the province in the States of Utrecht, during the Dutch Republic, as they had done in the States under the Habsburg rule. Not all Utrecht nobles were members; the members co-opted each other with the consent of the stadtholder. The ridderschap had one vote in the States. Members of the ridderschap could be delegated to the States General of the Netherlands as representatives of Utrecht in that body. As such they could be tasked with diplomatic missions. This explains why Van Reede in 1698 was a member of the Dutch delegation to the international conference that negotiated the Treaty of The Hague (1698). Such delegations usually had two members for Holland, and one member for each of the other provinces.) since his father relinquished this position in 1701.

=== Career ===
Van Reede received a commission as ritmeester of a company of horse in 1691, during the Nine Years' War, in his father's regiment in the Dutch States Army from William III of England. (Note: Van Nimwegen remarks that he probably owed this commission to the fact that he was able to afford the lifestyle required of the rank in an elite regiment of the time.) He distinguished himself in the Battle of Aughrim.

On 12 November 1696, he was promoted to colonel. (Note: Unlike his father he did not transfer to English service, though he was made a naturalized English subject.) In 1698, he was one of the eight signers on behalf of the Dutch Republic of the Treaty of The Hague (1698).

In 1702, the War of the Spanish Succession began. On 14 April 1704, Athlone was promoted to major-general. In 1706 he distinguished himself in the Battle of Ramillies. The next year he was also present at the Battle of Oudenarde. Later in 1708 he is mentioned, during the Siege of Lille, as being part of the column of Lieutenant-General Lottum which crossed the Scheldt river without much difficulty on the 26th of November. Later that year, he took part in the encirclement of Ghent. With 20 squadrons under his command, he occupied Oosterzele. Ghent fell after a short siege.

On 1 January 1709 he was promoted to lieutenant-general, and participated in the Battle of Malplaquet in that capacity.

In 1710 Athlone was tasked to defend a big supply convoy, consisting of 36 vessels along de Lys river. Marlborough had been urged to provide the escort with sufficient strength to counter attacks from nearby French garrisoned Ypres, but he believed he could not spare troops from the main army. Athlone's escort thus ended up consisting of only 400 mounted and 1,200 men on foot. The latter, commanded by lieutenant-colonel Amerongen, had been scrambled together from all the various Allied fortifications in the Spanish Netherlands and thus did not comprise the best soldiers. Also included were some English recruits and Spanish troops who had never been under fire before. On the 17th of September, the escort left Ghent and was at Vive St Eloy, near Kortrijk, on the 19th. The governor of Ypres, lieutenant-general De Chevilly, having learned of the convoy, had already detached 2,400 good troops under Ravignan on the evening of the 18th to intercept the convoy. The next day, around 2 in the afternoon, after marching for about 17 hours, the French arrived on the scene of the convoy.

Athlone, who by now had known about the French arrival for some time, had placed his troops in a favourable position, behind a ditch and hedge in the meadows along the river. However, this was to no avail. The determined attack by the French under Ravignan soon drove the allied troops to flight. Many were cut down by the French cavalry or drowned in the river. Of the Allied horsemen, only half managed to escape and of the infantry only 100 men. The French took 620 prisoners including Amerongen and Athlone himself. The convoy itself also fell almost entirely into the hands of the French. Only three vessels carrying flour managed to escape. (Note: De Vryer relates that the French blew up the vessels carrying gunpowder which caused such an explosion that the bed of the river was damaged to such an extent that the river had to be dedged to restore the required depth. Despite the loss of the convoy the supply of the Allied army with gunpowder was not seriously hampered, as there were sufficient supplies available in Ghent.)

In 1712, he was again part of the Allied army in a campaign that would not prove fortunate for the Allies. After the Battle of Denain, he was posted with some troops on the left wing of the army to guard the Scarpe River.

After the Peace of Utrecht, which ended the war, he was appointed military governor of the fortress of Mons on 19 May 1713 in the service of the Dutch States Army. On 26 February 1718, he was appointed governor of Sluis as successor of François Nicolas Fagel.

He died in Sluis on 15 August 1719, and was buried in Amerongen.

== Sources ==
- Aa, A.J. van der, ed. (1874). "Frederik Christiaan van Reede". Biographisch woordenboek der Nederlanden (in Dutch). Vol. 16. p. 139.
- Blok, P.J.; Molhuysen, P.C., eds. (1914). "Reede-ginckel, Frederik Christiaan baron van". Nieuw Nederlandsch biografisch woordenboek (in Dutch). Vol. 3. pp. 1013–1014.
- Vryer, A. de (1740). Histori van Joan Churchil, hertog van Marlborough en prins van Mindelheim (in Dutch). Vol. 4.
- Wijn, J.W. (1959). Het Staatsche Leger: Deel VIII-2 Het tijdperk van de Spaanse Successieoorlog 1706–1710 (The Dutch States Army: Part VIII-2 The era of the War of the Spanish Succession 1706–1710) (in Dutch). Martinus Nijhoff.
- Wijn, J.W. (1964). Het Staatsche Leger: Deel VIII-3 Het tijdperk van de Spaanse Successieoorlog 1711–1715 (The Dutch States Army: Part VIII-3 The era of the War of the Spanish Succession 1702–1705) (in Dutch). Martinus Nijhoff.
- Lamigue, Isaac (1716). Het leven van Zyne Hoogheit Johan Willem Friso volume 1 (in Dutch). Johannes Oosterwyk.

Peerage of Ireland
Preceded by Godert de Ginkel, 1st Earl of Athlone	Earl of Athlone; 1703–1719	Succeeded by Godard Adriaan van Reede, 3rd Earl of Athlone
Dutch nobility
Preceded by Godert de Ginkel, 1st Earl of Athlone	Baron van Reede; 1703–1719	Succeeded by Godard Adriaan van Reede, 3rd Earl of Athlone
