= Charles François de Boufflers =

French military officer

Charles François de Boufflers, Marquis de Remiencourt (c.19 November 1680 – 18 November 1743) was a French military officer and nobleman.

== Biography ==
Boufflers was the eldest son of Charles II de Boufflers, Seigneur of Remiencourt, and Marie du Bos de Drancourt. He was baptised on 19 November 1680.

His military career began in 1696 in a regiment of musketeers during the Nine Years' War, and he took part in the campaigns in Flanders that year and in 1697. On 15 April 1699, he was appointed lieutenant réformé in the Régiment du Roi, on 15 August 1700 he was made Enseige in the Régiment des Gardes Françaises. He served in Flanders in 1701 and in the Netherlands in 1702 during the War of the Spanish Succession. In September 1702 he became colonel of an infantry regiment of his name. Boufflers led his regiment in the Siege of Lille in 1708, being wounded in a sortie in October. On 12 November 1708 he was promoted to brigadier. He was present at the Battle of Malplaquet in September 1709.

From January 1710, Boufflers commanded the Régiment de Barrois (and gave up the regiment of his name) under Marshal Berwick. From May 1711 he was again assigned to the Flanders Army and fought in the attack on Arleux. In 1712 he took part in the conquests of Douai, Le Quesnoy and Bouchain. From 14 November 1713 he commanded the 11e Régiment d'infanterie de France (and gave up the Régiment de Barrois in return), with which he took part in the siege of Freiburg im Breisgau.

On 8 March 1718, Boufflers was made maréchal de camp and on 23 December 1731 he was appointed lieutenant-général des Armées du Roi, but by this stage was no longer in regular army service. On 7 May 1743, he became a commander in the Order of Saint Louis. He died in Paris on 18 November 1743.

Boufflers married his cousin, Louise Antoinette Charlotte de Boufflers, the daughter of Louis-François de Boufflers, on 18 September 1713. Together they had eight children.

French nobility
New title	Marquis de Remiencourt ?–1743	Succeeded by Louis-François de Boufflers
