= Louis-François de Boufflers =

French soldier (1644–1711)

- Duke of Boufflers
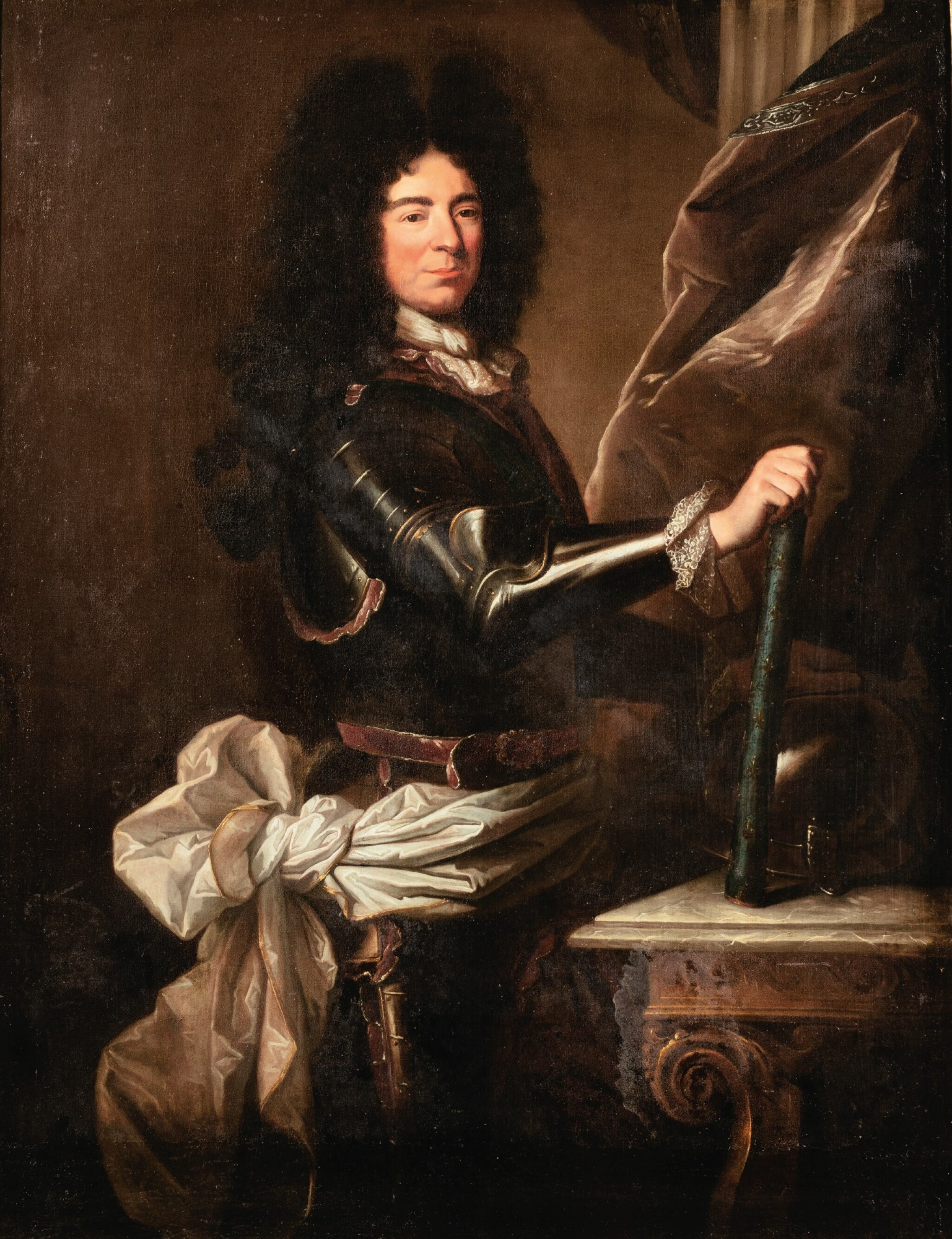
- Portrait of the duke

Governor of Flanders and Hainaut
- Tenure: 31 August 1694 – 22 August 1711
- Predecessor: Post created
- Successor: Joseph Marie de Boufflers
- Monarch: Louis XIV
- Born: 10 January 1644; Crillon, Province of Picardy, Kingdom of France
- Died: 22 August 1711 (aged 67); Fontainebleau, Kingdom of France
- Spouse: Catherine Charlotte de Gramont
- Issue: Joseph Marie, Duke of Boufflers
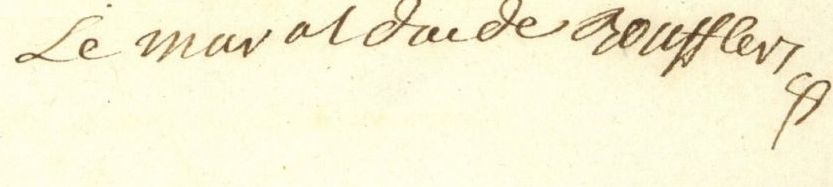
- Signature

Military service
- Allegiance: Kingdom of France
- Years of service: 1663–1711
- Battles/wars: Siege of Marsal; War of Devolution; Franco-Dutch War; Battle of Entzheim; Battle of Salzbach; Nine Years' War; Siege of Mainz; Battle of Fleurus; Siege of Mons; Siege of Namur; Battle of Steenkerque; Siege of Namur; War of the Spanish Succession; Assault on Nijmegen; Battle of Ekeren; Siege of Lille; Battle of Malplaquet

Louis François de Boufflers, Duke of Boufflers (10 January 1644 – 22 August 1711), known in his lifetime as Chevalier Boufflers, was a prominent French soldier during the reign of Louis XIV of France. He was famed for his excellent defensive leadership during the sieges of Namur and Lille, next to his conduct during the Battle of Malplaquet. He received many honours for his military service, including being created count of Cagny (modern Crillon) and duke of Boufflers and being named a marshal of France.

== Biography ==
=== Military service ===
Louis-François was born at Crillon in Oise on 10 January 1644, the son of a nobleman, François de Boufflers, and Louise Le Vergeur. He entered the French Royal Army and saw service in 1663 at the Siege of Marsal, becoming colonel of dragoons in 1669. In the conquest of Lorraine (1670), he served under the Marshal de Créqui. In the Dutch Republic, he served under Henri de la Tour d'Auvergne, Vicomte de Turenne, frequently distinguishing himself by his skill and bravery. When Turenne was killed by a cannon shot in 1675, he commanded the rear-guard during the retreat of the French army. He was already a brigadier, and in 1677 he became maréchal de camp.

He served throughout the campaigns of the time with increasing distinction, and in 1681 became lieutenant-general. He commanded the French army on the Moselle, which opened the War of the Grand Alliance with a series of victories. On 15 October 1688, he took the important fortress Mainz, the Aureum caput regni, with 20,000 soldiers, then he led a corps to the Sambre, and reinforced François Henri de Montmorency, Duke of Piney on the eve of the Battle of Fleurus.

In 1691, he acted as lieutenant-general under the king in person, and during the investment of Mons he was wounded in an attack on the town. He was present with the king at the siege of Namur in 1692, and took part in the victory of Steinkirk. For his services he was raised in 1692 to the rank of Marshal of France, and in 1694 was made a duke. In 1693, he married Catherine Charlotte de Gramont.

In 1694, he was appointed governor of French Flanders and of the town of Lille. He was besieged in Namur in 1695 by William III of England, and only surrendered to his besiegers after he had lost 8,000 of his 13,000 men in two months of fighting. In the conferences which terminated in the Peace of Ryswick he had a principal share.

During the following war (the War of the Spanish Succession) in 1702, Boufflers attempted to capture Nijmegen and to save Kaiserswerth, but this was unsuccessful. The next year he led a Franco-Spanish force at the Battle of Ekeren. In 1704, he commanded the King's Bodyguard. In 1708, when Lille was threatened with a siege by John Churchill, 1st Duke of Marlborough and Prince Eugène of Savoy, Boufflers was appointed to the command. He gallantly led resistance to the siege for almost four months before surrendering.

He was rewarded and honoured by Louis XIV for his defence of Lille, as if he had been victorious. It was indeed a species of triumph; Boufflers' enemy, appreciating his merits, allowed him to dictate his own terms of capitulation. In 1708 he was made a peer of France. In 1709, when the affairs of France were threatened with the most urgent danger, Boufflers offered to serve under his junior, Claude Louis Hector de Villars, Marshal-Duke of Villars, and was with him at the Battle of Malplaquet. Here he displayed the highest skill, and after Villars was wounded he conducted the retreat of the French army without losing either cannon or prisoners.

=== Personal life ===
He married Catherine Charlotte de Gramont, daughter of Antoine Charles de Gramont, Duke of Gramont. They had one son, Joseph Marie de Boufflers, Duke of Boufflers (22 May 1706 – 2 July 1747). Louis-François' daughter, Louise Antoinette Charlotte, married his cousin, Charles François de Boufflers.

In 1694, Boufflers had his portrait painted by Hyacinthe Rigaud for 500 livres.

Boufflers died at Fontainebleau on 22 August 1711. He was buried four days later in the church of Saint-Paul-Saint-Louis. A cenotaph, attributed to François Girardon, was built in his home village of Crillon to contain his heart, but the memorial was desecrated in 1794 during the Reign of Terror.

=== Titles and honours ===
Louis-François bore several titles, but was generally known during his lifetime as the Chevalier Boufflers. He was made a knight of the Order of the Holy Spirit in 1692. From 1695 he held the title of Duc de Boufflers ("Duke of Boufflers"), when his countship of Comte de Cagny ("Count of Cagny") was raised to a dukedom. In January 1705, Louis XIV authorized Boufflers to bear on his coat of arms the standards of colonel general of the dragoons and the flags of colonel of the French guards. From 1708, he was a peer of France.

== Notes ==
French nobility
New title	Duke of Boufflers; 1694–1711	Succeeded by Joseph Marie de Boufflers
