= Frederik Willem van Reede, 6th Earl of Athlone =

Irish aristocrat

Frederick Willem van Reede, 6th Earl of Athlone (21 October 1766 – 5 December 1810) became Earl of Athlone on his father's death, 13 December 1808.

He married, firstly and without issue, in March 1789 at Utrecht, Cornelia Adriaana Munter. They were divorced 5 July 1793 on the basis of her criminal consort with a German officer, Col. von Bosc. She died 24 October 1828 at Dresden.

He married secondly, on 11 November 1800, Maria Eden, daughter of Sir John Eden, 4th Baronet of Durham.

He died, insane and without issue, of "water on the brain" at Greenwich, and was succeeded in the earldom by his brother.

His widow married 30 October 1821, as his second wife, Vice Admiral Sir William Johnstone Hope.

Peerage of Ireland
Preceded by Fredrik van Reede	Earl of Athlone; 1808–1810	Succeeded by Reynoud van Reede
