= Earl of Athlone =

Extinct earldom in the Peerage of the United Kingdom

- Quarterly quartered: 1st grandquarter, I and IV: Royal arms of England, II: of Scotland; III: of Ireland; in chief a label of three points argent, the centre point charged with a cross of St. George and each of the other points with two hearts in pale also gules; upon an escutcheon of pretence the arms of Hanover, gules, two lions passant guardant in pale or, impaling a semée of hearts gules, a lion rampant azure, on a point in point gules a horse courant; 2nd and 3rd grand quarters: Party per pale, on the dexter side three stags attirés fesseways in pale sable, on the sinister side three lions passant in pale sable, over all an inescutcheon of the arms of the Duchy of Teck; in the centre point a crescent for difference
- Creation date: 16 July 1917
- Creation: Third
- Created by: King George V
- Peerage: Peerage of the United Kingdom
- First holder: Prince Alexander of Teck (first and last holder of the 3rd creation)
- Remainder to: Heirs male of the 1st earl's body lawfully begotten
- Subsidiary titles: Viscount Trematon
- Status: Extinct
- Extinction date: 16 January 1957
- Seat: Brantridge Park
- Motto: "Fearless and Faithful"

The title of Earl of Athlone has been created three times.

== History ==
Arms of van Reede, Earl of Athlone (1st creation)

It was created first in the Peerage of Ireland in 1692 by King William III for General Baron van Reede, Lord of Ginkel, a Dutch nobleman, to honour him for his successful battles in Ireland including the Siege of Athlone. The title also had the subsidiary title of Baron Aughrim. These titles became extinct in 1844 upon the death of the 9th Earl. The Earls also bore the Danish nobility title Baron van Reede (hereditary in male line).

The second creation was in the Peerage of the United Kingdom, as a subsidiary title of the Dukedom of Clarence and Avondale, and was conferred in 1890 upon Prince Albert Victor of Wales, the eldest son of the Prince of Wales. When he died in 1892, the title became extinct.

The third creation was in 1917, also in the Peerage of the United Kingdom, for the former Prince Alexander of Teck, younger brother of Queen Mary and great‑uncle of Queen Elizabeth II, along with the subsidiary title of Viscount Trematon. The earldom was given after members of the British royal family renounced their German royal titles. Alexander had two sons who predeceased him, and the titles became extinct after his death.

== Earls of Athlone, first creation (1692) ==
- Godard van Reede, 1st Earl of Athlone (1630–1703)
- Frederick Christiaan van Reede, 2nd Earl of Athlone (1668–1719)
- Godard Adriaan van Reede, 3rd Earl of Athlone (1716–1736)
- Fredrik Willem van Reede, 4th Earl of Athlone (1717–1747)
- Fredrik Christiaan Reinhart van Reede, 5th Earl of Athlone (1743–1808)
- Frederik Willem van Reede, 6th Earl of Athlone (1766–1810)
- Reynoud Diederik Jacob van Reede, 7th Earl of Athlone (1773–1823)
- George Godard Henry van Reede, 8th Earl of Athlone (1820–1843)
- Willem Gustaaf Frederik van Reede, 9th Earl of Athlone (1780–1844)

== Earls of Athlone, second creation (1890) ==
- Prince Albert Victor Christian Edward, 1st Duke of Clarence and Avondale, 1st Earl of Athlone (1864–1892)

== Earls of Athlone, third creation (1917) ==
- Alexander Augustus Frederick William Alfred George Cambridge, 1st Earl of Athlone (1874–1957)
