= Reynoud Diederik Jacob van Reede, 7th Earl of Athlone =

Reynoud Diederik Jacob van Reede, 7th Earl of Athlone (24 July 1773 – 31 October 1823), son of the 5th Earl of Athlone, succeeded his brother as Earl of Athlone on 5 December 1810.

Lord Athlone married 19 March 1818, at the British Embassy in Paris, Henrietta Dorothea Maria, daughter of John Williams Hope by his wife Ann Goddard. He died of apoplexy, at the Hague, and was succeeded in the earldom by their son George Godard Henry van Reede.

His widow married 4 May 1825 William Gambier and had further issue.

Peerage of Ireland
Preceded by Frederick van Reede	Earl of Athlone; 1810–1823	Succeeded by George van Reede
