= Siege of Mons (1691) =

1691 battle of the Nine Years' War

Coordinates: 50.4500°N 3.9500°E

- Part of the Nine Years' War
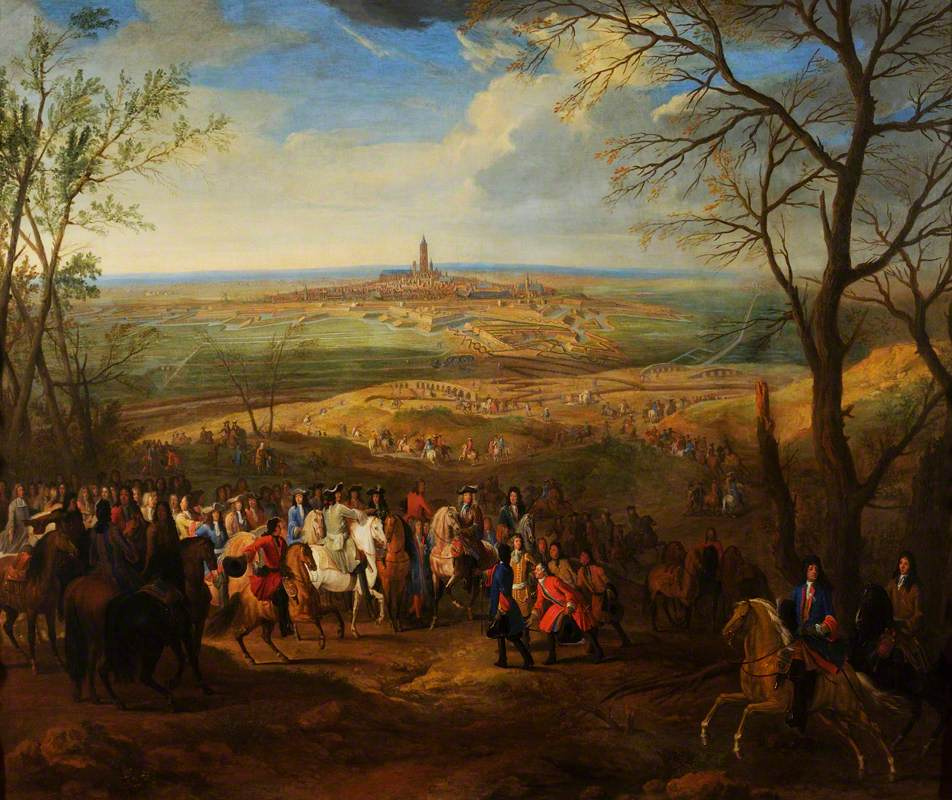
- Louis XIV Accepting the Surrender of Mons
Date	15 March – 10 April 1691
Location	Mons, Spanish Netherlands (Present-day Belgium)
Result	French victory

Belligerents
France	Spain; Dutch Republic; Holy Roman Empire

Commanders and leaders
(Kingdom of France) Louis XIV (Kingdom of France) Marquis de Vauban (Kingdom of France) Duc de Boufflers (Kingdom of France) Dauphin Louis	(Spain) Prince of Grimberghen (Spain) Marquis of Gastañaga

Strength
92,000; 90 guns	~4,800

Casualties and losses
No data	No data

The siege of Mons, 15 March – 10 April 1691, was a major operation fought during the Nine Years' War, and was the main French objective for the 1691 campaign in the Spanish Netherlands. The city was besieged and captured before the normal commencement of the campaigning season with minimal losses. The outcome was not in doubt, but in a conflict dominated by siege warfare, neither the French army of King Louis XIV, nor the forces of the Grand Alliance under King William III, could bring about a decisive battle. After the siege the duc de Boufflers bombarded the neutral city of Liège, whilst the duc de Luxembourg captured Halle, and scored a minor victory against the Prince of Waldeck at the Battle of Leuze in September. Strategically, however, little had changed in the war, and both combatants returned to winter quarters at the end of the campaigning season.

== Background ==
French forces had secured considerable success in 1690. In July Luxembourg fought and won his tactical masterpiece at the Battle of Fleurus, nullifying any Allied hopes of invading France, whilst at sea, Admiral Tourville defeated an Anglo-Dutch fleet off Beachy Head. In August Catinat had triumphed at the Battle of Staffarda in northern Italy (although his force was too small to gain any strategic advantage). The only bright spot for the Grand Alliance in 1690 was King William's victory over James II in Ireland at the Battle of the Boyne. Yet despite the battlefield successes, French forces in 1690 had failed to break the coalition ranged against the ambitions of King Louis.

In 1691 the French had planned for a double strike: Nice in northern Italy, and Mons in the Spanish Netherlands. The Netherlands were again where France would concentrate its main war effort, and was a theatre where Louis’ war minister, Louvois, had striven to bring together an even larger army than had been assembled the year before. These attacks on Nice and Mons were planned for very early in the campaign season, illustrating Vauban’s dictum that "It is a very favourable circumstance to be able to attack before the enemy takes the field in strength … "

Meanwhile, in Ireland the war continued into 1691, but William now felt secure enough on his new throne in the British Isles to return to the war on the Continent. William entered The Hague on 5 February to organise his army for the coming campaign. After securing forces totalling 220,000 men, the Stadtholder-King retired to his country home. In mid-March, surrounded by representatives of the Grand Alliance, he received news that Mons was under siege.

== Siege ==
Louvois engineered the considerable preparations for the siege throughout the preceding winter: stores were filled with supplies in Namur, Philippeville, Dinant and Givet, and no less than 21,000 labourers were gathered for the construction of the lines of circumvallation.

Louis, accompanied by members of his court, joined his army in the Spanish Netherlands to take control of the armies in theatre, arriving at the front on 21 March. The King's besieging army of 46,000 (under the direction of his great engineer, Vauban) surrounded the town and its garrison of some 4,800 men. The Allies had formed an army of 38,000 under William to relieve the city, but Luxembourg's army of observation, also 46,000 strong, denied the Allies any possibility of disrupting the operation.

Marshal Boufflers began the investment on 15 March; the trenches were opened ten days later. In one of the most intense attacks of all King Louis’ wars, two batteries, each consisting of 12 mortars, bombarded the city in preparation for the assault; by 30 March, the French had fired 7,000 cannonballs and 3,000 mortar shells. Inevitably, at 17:00 on 8 April, the besieged inhabitants beat the chamade; conditions were settled, and the remaining men of the garrison marched out two days later.

== Aftermath ==
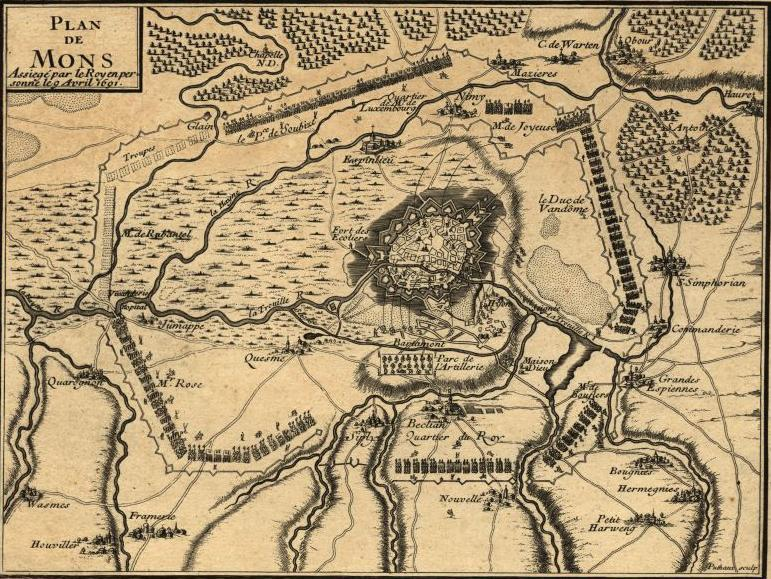
Contemporary plan showing the bombardment and investment of Mons in 1691.

The siege had begun and ended before the normal commencement of campaigning. Louis returned to Versailles on 12 April, whilst William, after distributing his troops to various garrisons, returned to The Hague. The French now prepared for the rest of the 1691 campaign season with the creation of five large armies bound for five major fronts: Flanders, the Moselle, the Rhine, Piedmont, and Roussillon. The largest of these forces, 49 battalions and 140 squadrons under the command Luxembourg, took station in Flanders, but little was accomplished after the siege by either the French or the Grand Alliance. Luxembourg devastated Halle at the end of May, whilst Boufflers bombarded neutral Liège in early June, but these aggressive acts had no political results. Louis’ personal military advisor and expert in the art of war, the Marquis de Chamlay, argued that these victories should be followed by a field battle that would destroy the Allied army and force a conclusion to the conflict. Louvois, however, suggested a bombardment of Brussels would force the issue, but was opposed by Luxembourg and Vauban.

William, meanwhile, arrived at Anderlecht on 2 June to take command of the Allied army of 63 battalions and 180 squadrons, totalling 56,000 men. Luxembourg successfully manoeuvred to prevent William besieging Dinant, but subsequent manoeuvres produced little action. After William left his troops in the command of the Prince of Waldeck, Luxembourg's cavalry routed part of the Allied army at Leuze on 18 September, before all combatants returned to winter quarters.
