= Siege of Namur (1692) =

1692 battle of the Nine Years' War

- Part of the Nine Years' War
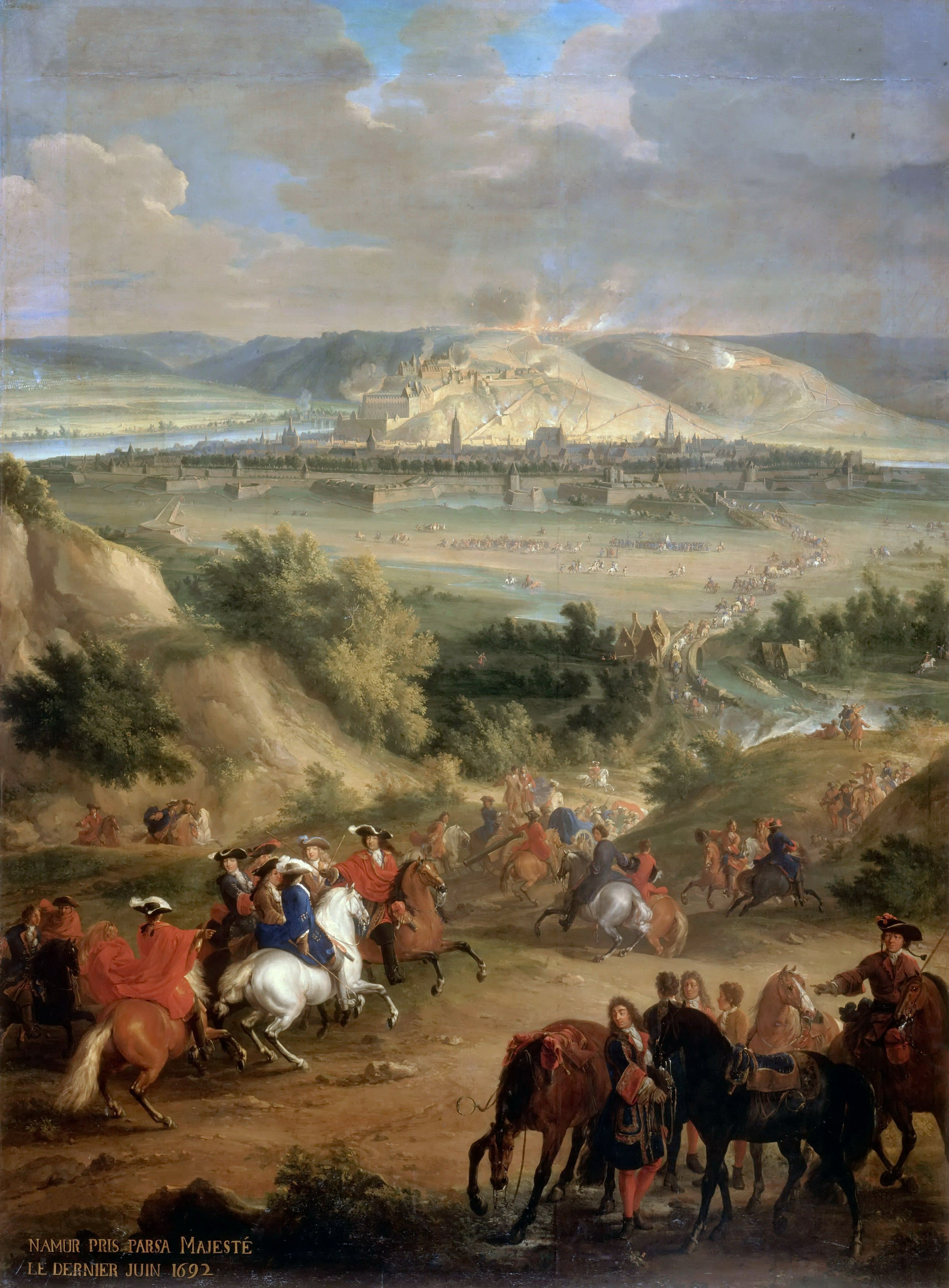
- Siege of Namur, June 1692 by Martin Jean-Baptiste le vieux
Date	25 May–30 June 1692
Location	Namur, Spanish Netherlands (present-day Belgium); 50°28′N 04°52′E
Result	French victory

Belligerents
France	Spain; Holy Roman Empire; Dutch Republic

Commanders and leaders
(Kingdom of France) King Louis XIV (Kingdom of France) Marquis de Vauban (Kingdom of France) Duc de Boufflers	(Spain) Duke of Barbançon (Dutch Republic) Menno van Coehoorn

Strength
120,000; 151 guns	6,000; 8,000–9,000

Casualties and losses
7,000 killed or wounded	4,000 killed or wounded

The siege of Namur, 25 May–30 June 1692, was a major engagement of the Nine Years' War, and was part of the French grand plan (devised over the winter of 1691–92) to defeat the forces of the Grand Alliance and bring a swift conclusion to the war. Namur, sitting on the confluence of the Meuse and Sambre rivers, was a considerable fortress, and was a significant political and military asset. French forces, guided by Vauban, forced the town's surrender on 5 June, but the citadel, staunchly defended by Menno van Coehoorn, managed to hold on until 30 June before capitulating, bringing an end to the 36-day siege. Concerned that King William III planned to recapture the stronghold, King Louis XIV subsequently ordered his commander-in-chief, the duc de Luxembourg, to join battle with the Allies in the field, resulting in the bloody Battle of Steenkerque on 3 August.

== Background ==
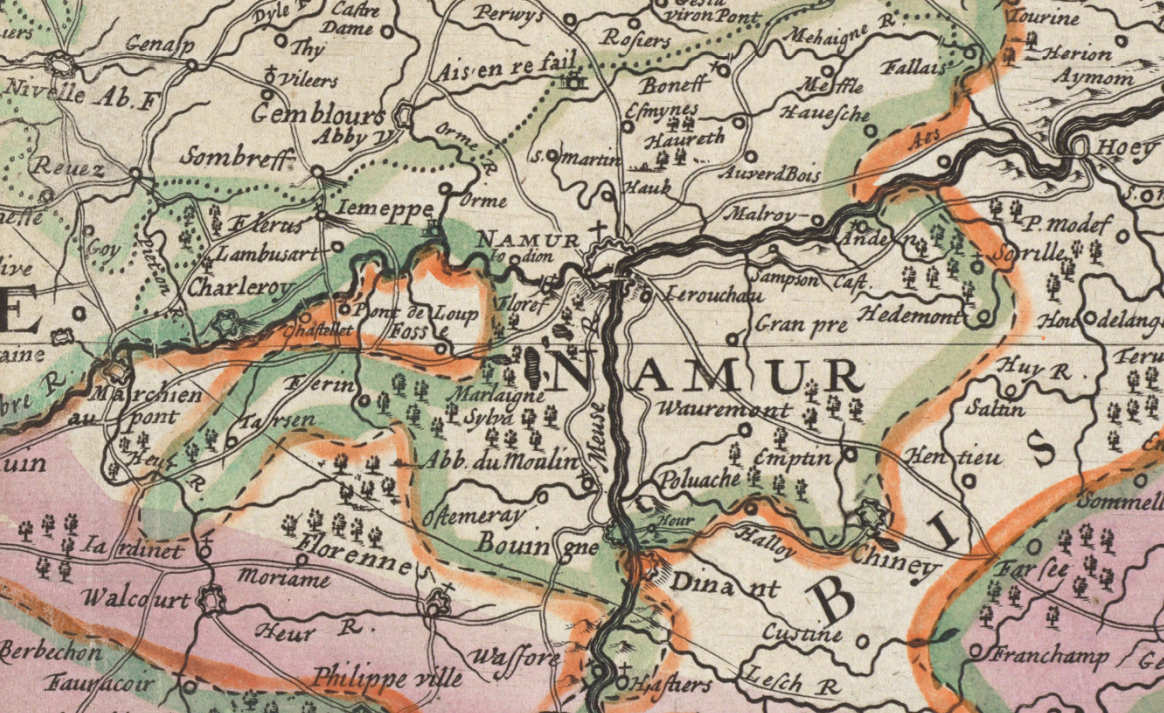
Detail of a contemporary map of the Spanish Netherlands that shows the limit of French conquests (in pink) shortly before the start of the campaign of Namur.

As in 1691, five large armies were created for the five major fronts of the war: Flanders, the Moselle, the Rhine, Piedmont, and Roussillon. To them was added a further force in Flanders to attack what was to be France's major goal for 1692, the important Sambre–Meuse fortress of Namur. The capture of the fortress would give control of the vicinity to France, and it might also inspire the Dutch to make peace. If its capture did not lead to immediate talks, it would nevertheless be an important pawn at any future negotiations.

To deter William from marching to the town's relief, Louis arranged for a simultaneous landing in England to assist King James II in his attempt to regain his throne. That force consisted of 12,000 Catholic Irish troops, released after the conclusion of the Irish war under the terms of the Treaty of Limerick, supported by a similar number of French troops. However, an essential preliminary to the invasion was the acquisition of naval supremacy in the English Channel.

== Siege ==
Louis, accompanied by individuals of the court, left Versailles for Flanders on 10 May. French cavalry invested the town on the night of 25–26 May; the main army arrived the following day. The French forces were even larger than Louis had gathered for the Siege of Mons the previous year: the besieging army amounted some 60,000 men and 151 guns; the duc de Luxembourg's army of observation, designed to prevent William coming to Namur's assistance, also had about 60,000 men. Namur's garrison, under the command of Octavius Ignatius, Prince of Arenberg and Barbançon, totalled approximately 6,000.

=== Fall of town ===
The Siege of Namur in 1692 was a particularly notable operation of King Louis's reign. First, the action involved the two great military engineers of the day: Vauban, who oversaw the siege, and the Dutch engineer, Menno van Coehoorn, who directed the defences of the stronghold. Second, the location and topography of the position made the siege particularly challenging. The actual town of Namur sat on low flat land on the north bank of the Sambre that was dominated by heights on all sides. However, by reason of the position of its citadel (a complex of fortifications occupying the height on the south bank between the confluence of the Sambre and Meuse), it was one of the strongest frontiers in Flanders.

Vauban had secretly reconnoitred Namur the year before and managed to draw up plans of the town's defences. Guided by those drawings, the French constructed lines of circumvallation, and positioned several large, well-equipped batteries; trenches for three lines of advance opened on the night of 29–30 May. William, meanwhile, moved his forces southwest closer to Namur, and Luxembourg moved his army of observation east from Gembloux to Longchamps, north of the town. William hoped to bring Luxembourg to battle on the Mehaigne, but the rain-swollen river had made a crossing impossible.

Most of the garrison of Namur were Spanish troops, weak and in poor condition. The garrison managed a small sortie to reinforce a battery covering the main town, but it met with limited success. Offering little resistance the town capitulated on 5 June, when it was agreed there would be a truce until the morning of 7 June. During that respite, the garrison crossed over to the citadel complex, and the French entered the town. It was also agreed that during the rest of the siege, the Allies would not fire down on the town from the heights, and the French would not attack the citadel from that direction. In his memoirs, Jean Martin de la Colonie, a participant of the siege wrote, "It was through ignorance of the true state of the fortifications that these articles were agreed to, as it is only from the town side that the fortress could be taken, the rest being almost impregnable".

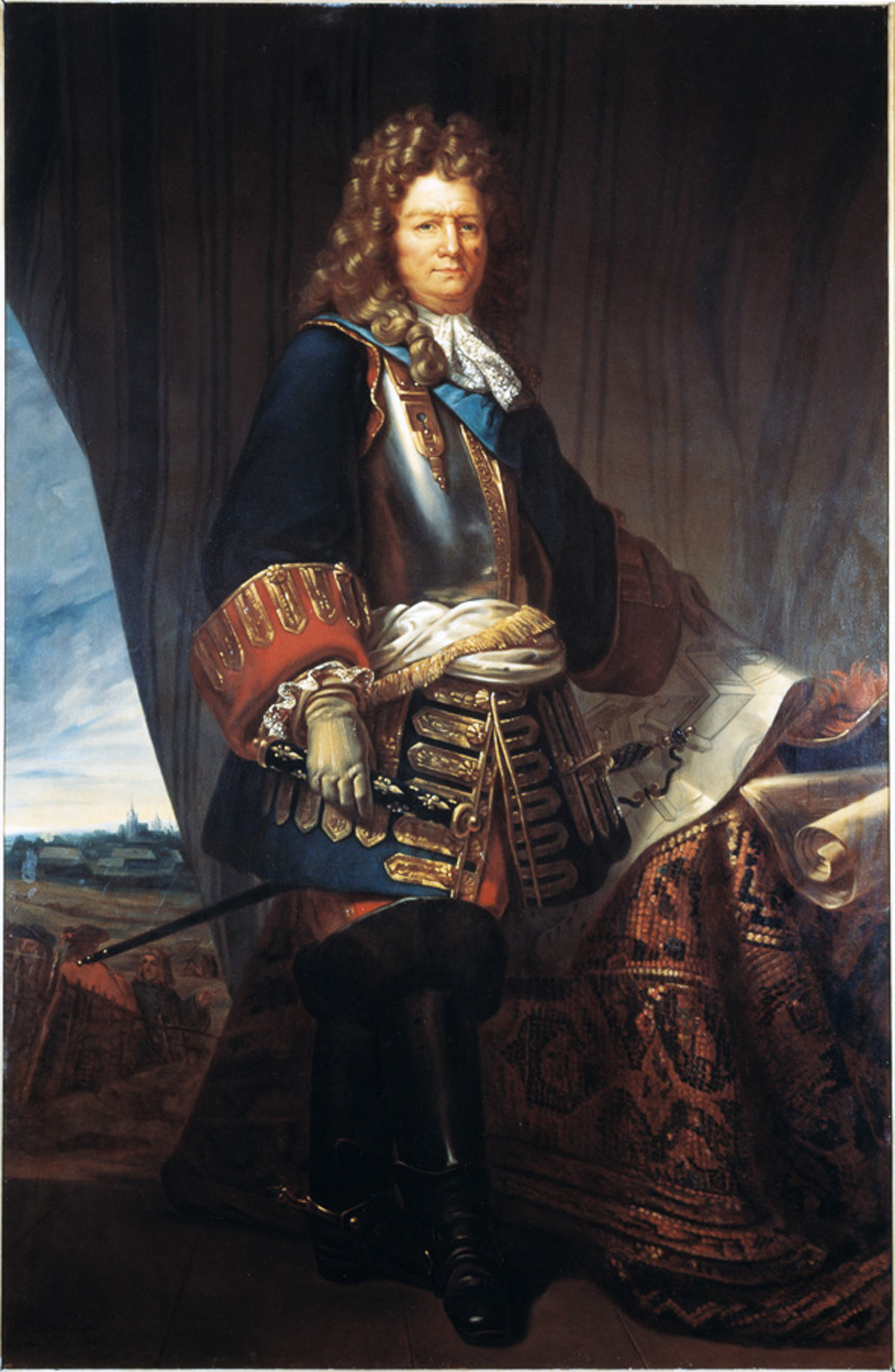
Vauban, King Louis XIV's greatest military engineer.

=== Fall of citadel ===
The River Sambre separates the citadel and the town; the weakest side of the citadel lies along the river, but the terms of the truce signed at the surrender of the town prevented the French from attacking from this direction. The section of the citadel overlooking the Meuse is on a rocky height that is inaccessible and impossible to attack. The key to the citadel, therefore, was Fort William (named after William of Orange, who had built it), positioned to the west of the other main strongpoints. It was in that direction that the French were obliged to attack (see map).

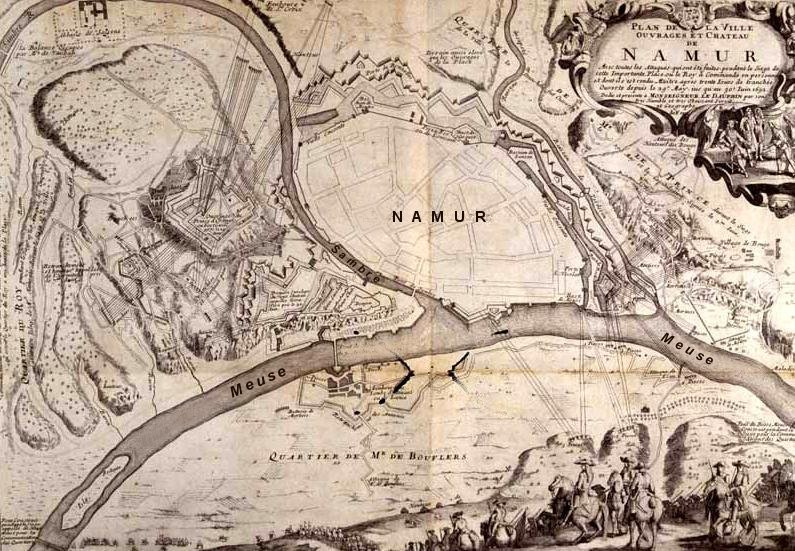
Contemporary plan of the Siege of Namur 1692 (shown here with the Meuse running south–north).

The first task for the attackers was to take the outlying redoubt of La Cachotte, which covered the approaches to Fort William. The trench was opened on 8 June; a major assault – consisting of seven battalions, accompanied by the King's Musketeers – followed on 12 June. La Cachotte fell, and Vauban turned to seizing Fort William, which was personally defended by Coehoorn. The fort was well sited, just over the crest of the rise, obscuring the stronghold from the attackers until they were almost upon it and masking its walls from artillery fire. French sappers approached from two directions, but the recent heavy rain had made the whole operation extremely difficult. In a dramatic gesture, Coehoorn ordered his own grave dug to symbolise his commitment to defend the position to the end, but although his grave was not needed, the Dutch engineer was wounded in the head by a shell that killed his valet. The final assault on Fort William came on 22 June. Despite Coehoorn's resolute defence, he and the 200 men who had garrisoned the fort, capitulated. Vauban greeted his rival the next day and consoled him that at least he had "the honour of being attacked by the greatest king in the world". Coehoorn replied that his real consolation was in the fact that he had forced his great rival to move his siege batteries seven times during the assault.

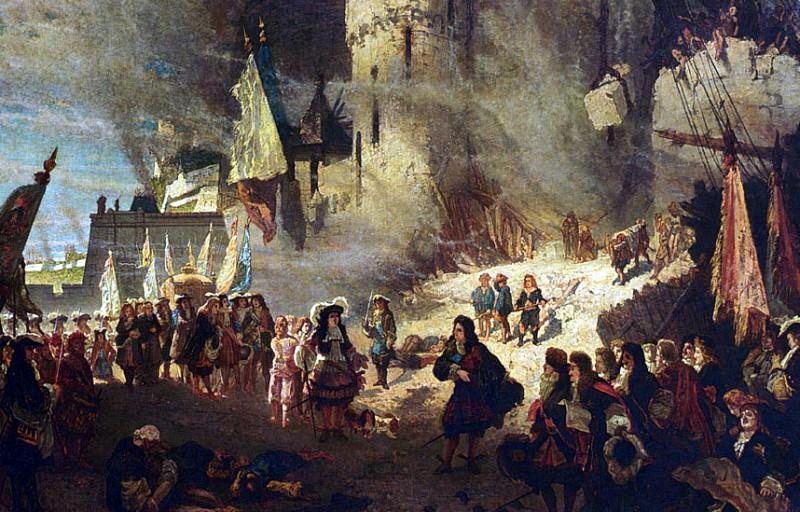
Coehoorn and Vauban meet in the ruins of Namur, 1692. By August Allebé.

The heavy rain had made the roads become virtually impassable, which greatly restricted the supply of ammunition to the French gun batteries. Saint-Simon wrote, "It sometimes took as much as three days to move a cannon from one battery to another. The wagons were unusable, and shells, cannon-balls, etc., had to be transported on mules and horses.... Without them nothing would have been possible". However, the surrounding country, much of it woodland, provided so little forage that the French were forced to feed their animals on leaves and branches, which resulted in many losses.

Hampered in this way and lacking ammunition, Vauban had sought permission from the King to renege on their earlier treaty and to attack the citadel from the side of the town: an act that, in Vauban's opinion, would be less disgraceful than raising the siege. However, after Fort William fell, the other works did not hold out long. The final capitulation came on 30 June; the remainder of the garrison left on 1 July. To Saint-Simon, who was at the siege, that came none too soon for the besiegers, "whose strength and provisions were nearly exhausted on account of the continual rain that had turned everything to a quagmire".

== Aftermath ==
Louis and his entourage left Namur on 2 July and reached Versailles two weeks later. The King ordered Te Deums of thanksgiving for the victory, but in the words of the historian John Wolf, he may have neglected the work of his engineers when he wrote that "the gloire of so great a victory belong to God alone …" Although Louis had secured a great victory at Namur, the proposed descent on England was, however, a failure. Defeat at the Battle of La Hogue in early June had denied the French naval superiority in the English Channel, thus ending any hopes of a landing. The Irish troops destined for England marched off to the Rhineland; the French troops joined the army in Flanders or were deployed to coastal defence.

Luxembourg waited while Namur was put into a state of defence before decamping on 8 July and following William III towards Nivelles. News arrived at Versailles that William was planning the recapture of Namur as soon as the Allied commander could assemble his army. Louis wrote to Luxembourg, urging him to "march with speed... and fight him before he can establish his trenches [before Namur]...". On 1 August William moved to Halle. William, like Louis, also sought battle and on 3 August surprised and attacked Luxembourg near the village of Steenkerque. The issue was not completely decisive, and both sides could claim a victory of sorts, but William left the field in French hands, thus ending the Allied threat to Namur. Little of note happened in the remainder of the campaign before they went into winter quarters.
