= Crillon, Oise =

Crillon
- Commune
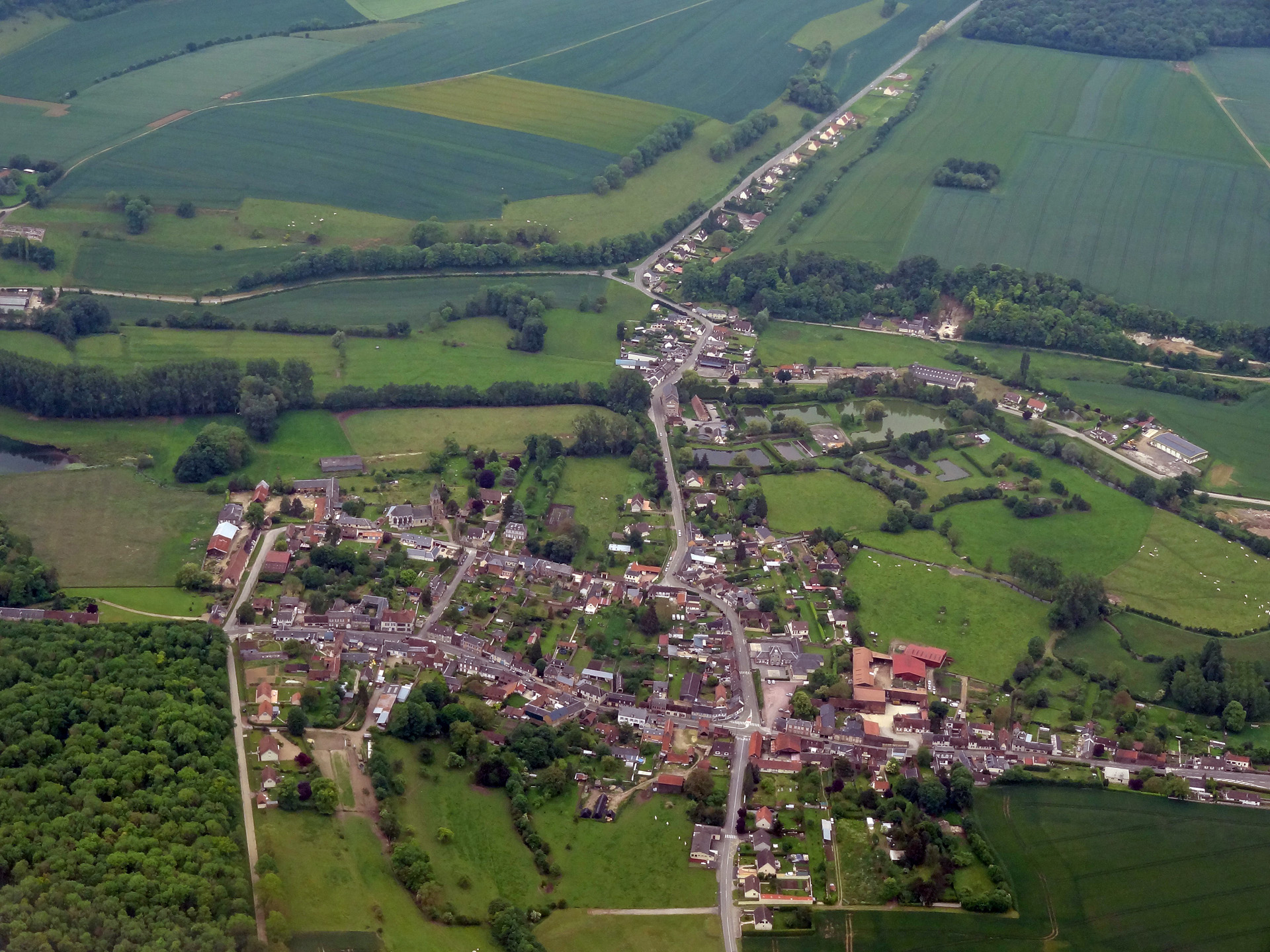
- An aerial view of Crillon
- Location of Crillon
- Location within France Location within Hauts-de-France
- Coordinates: 49°31′15″N 1°55′51″E
- Country: France
- Region: Hauts-de-France
- Department: Oise
- Arrondissement: Beauvais
- Canton: Grandvilliers
- Intercommunality: Picardie Verte

Government
  - Mayor (2020–2026): Patrick Prevost
- Area^{1}: 8.66 km^{2} (3.34 sq mi)
- Elevation: 90 m (300 ft)
- Highest elevation: 170 m (560 ft)
- Lowest elevation: 90 m (300 ft)
- Population (2023): 488
  - Density: 56.4/km^{2} (146/sq mi)
- Time zone: UTC+01:00 (CET)
  - Summer (DST): UTC+02:00 (CEST)
- INSEE/Postal code: 60180 /60112
- ^{1} French Land Register data, which excludes lakes, ponds, glaciers > 1 km^{2} (0.386 sq mi or 247 acres) and river estuaries.

Crillon (French pronunciation: [kʁijɔ̃]) is a commune in the Oise department in northern France.

== See also ==
- Communes of the Oise department
