= Siege of Charleroi =

Siege of Charleroi may refer to one of the following:

- Siege of Charleroi (1667), during the War of Devolution
- Siege of Charleroi (1672), during the Franco-Dutch War
- Siege of Charleroi (1693), during the War of the Grand Alliance
- Siege of Charleroi (1794), during the War of the First Coalition

== See also ==
- Charleroi
