= William III of England =

King of England, Scotland, and Ireland from 1689 to 1702

William III and II (Note: William was the third prince of Orange and the third king of England called William. He was the second king of Scotland called William.)
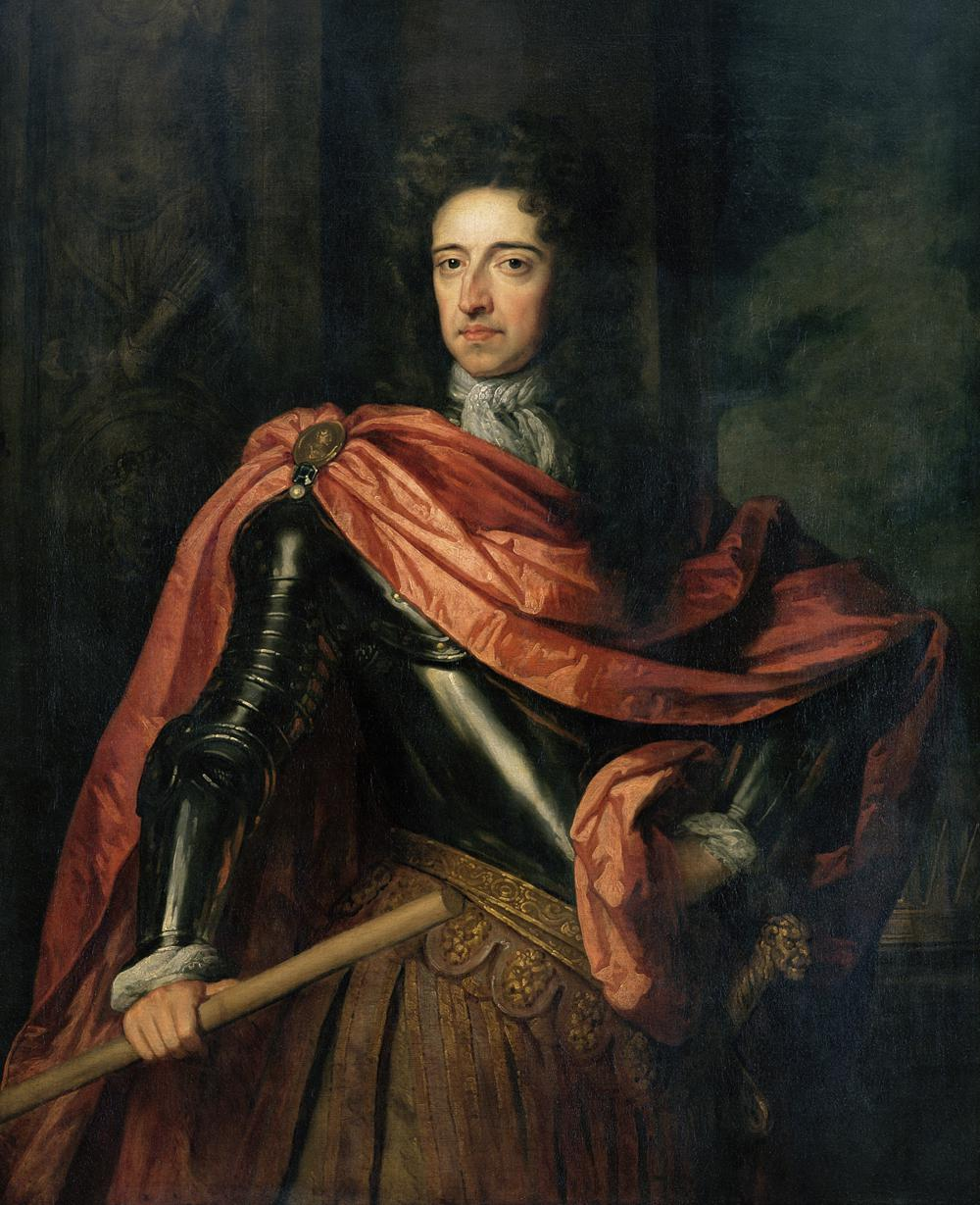
- Portrait, c. 1690

King of England, Scotland, and Ireland
- Reign: 1689 (Note: William was declared King by the Parliament of England on 13 February 1689 and by the Parliament of Scotland on 11 April 1689.) – 8 March 1702
- Coronation: 11 April 1689
- Predecessor: James II & VII
- Successor: Anne
- Co-monarch: Mary II (1689–1694)

Stadtholder of Holland, Zeeland, Utrecht, Guelders, and Overijssel
- Reign: 4 July 1672 – 8 March 1702
- Predecessor: First Stadtholderless Period
- Successor: Second Stadtholderless Period

Prince of Orange
- Reign: 4 November 1650 (Note: During William's lifetime, two calendars were in use in Europe: the Old Style Julian calendar in Britain and parts of Northern and Eastern Europe, and the New Style Gregorian calendar elsewhere, including William's birthplace in the Netherlands. At the time of William's birth, Gregorian dates were ten days ahead of Julian dates: thus William was born on 14 November 1650 by Gregorian reckoning, but on 4 November 1650 by Julian reckoning. At William's death, Gregorian dates were eleven days ahead of Julian dates. He died on 19 March 1702 by the Gregorian calendar, and on 8 March 1702 by the standard Julian calendar. (However, the English New Year fell on 25 March, so by English reckoning of the time, William died on 8 March 1701.) Unless otherwise noted, dates in this article follow the Julian calendar with New Year falling on 1 January.) – 8 March 1702
- Predecessor: William II
- Successor: John William Friso (disputed) (Note: Friso was made William's universal heir in his will. However, the title was disputed by Frederick I of Prussia, who had a claim to the title on the basis of a fideicommis made by his grandfather Frederick Henry, Prince of Orange, in which if the House of Orange became extinct in the male line the issue of his eldest daughter, Louise Henriette of Orange-Nassau, Frederick I's mother, would have first claim. (Friso's mother, Princess Henriëtte Amalia of Anhalt-Dessau, was a younger daughter of Frederick Henry.) The dispute was eventually settled in 1732 with the Treaty of Partition cf. First Stadtholderless Period.)
- Born: 4 November 1650 [NS: 14 November 1650] Binnenhof, The Hague, Dutch Republic
- Died: 8 March 1702 (aged 51) [NS: 19 March 1702] Kensington Palace, Middlesex, England
- Burial: 12 April 1702; Westminster Abbey
- Spouse: Mary II of England (m. 1677; died 1694)
Names
- William Henry; Dutch: Willem Hendrik
- House: Orange-Nassau
- Father: William II, Prince of Orange
- Mother: Mary, Princess Royal
- Religion: Protestantism

Military service
- Conflicts: See list: Franco-Dutch War; Battle of Woerden; Siege of Charleroi; Siege of Naarden; Siege of Bonn; Battle of Seneffe; Siege of Grave; Siege of Maastricht; Battle of Cassel; Battle of Saint-Denis; Nine Years' War; 1688 invasion of England; Battle of the Boyne; Siege of Limerick; Battle of Steenkerque; Battle of Landen; Siege of Namur

William III and II (William Henry; Dutch: Willem Hendrik; 4 November 1650 – 8 March 1702), also known as William of Orange, was the sovereign Prince of Orange from birth, Stadtholder of Holland, Zeeland, Utrecht, Guelders, and Overijssel in the Dutch Republic from 1672, and King of England, Scotland, and Ireland from 1689 until his death in 1702. He ruled England, Scotland, and Ireland with his wife, Queen Mary II, until her death in 1694; their joint reign is known as that of William and Mary.

William was the only child of William II, Prince of Orange, and Mary, Princess Royal, the daughter of King Charles I of England, Scotland, and Ireland. His father died before his birth, making William III the prince of Orange from birth. In 1677, he married his first cousin Mary, the elder daughter of his maternal uncle James, Duke of York (later King James II).

When the Catholic French king Louis XIV attacked the Dutch Republic in 1672, William rose to power and became Louis's greatest obstacle. He made it his life's mission to oppose Louis and waged many campaigns against Louis's armies. He reorganised the Dutch army, restoring its effectiveness after the disasters of the Rampjaar and transforming it into one of the most experienced and professional forces in Europe. Convinced that the expansionist policies of Louis XIV threatened the European balance of power, William devoted much of his career to resisting French hegemony.

Many Protestants heralded William as a champion of their faith. In 1685, his Catholic uncle and father-in-law, James, became king of England, Scotland, and Ireland. James's reign was unpopular with British Protestants, who opposed James's use of rule by decree, Catholic emancipation, and a Catholic succession to the throne. Supported by a group of influential English political and religious leaders, William invaded England with a Dutch force in November 1688. He landed at the south-western English port of Brixham and James was deposed shortly afterward. After occupying London he was swiftly offered the crown alongside his wife Mary. The event would be known as the Glorious Revolution, leading to the adoption of the English Bill of Rights.

During the early years of his reign, William was occupied abroad with the Nine Years' War (1688–1697), leaving Mary to govern the three kingdoms. She died in 1694. In 1696, the Jacobites, a faction loyal to the deposed James, plotted unsuccessfully to assassinate William and restore James to the throne. In Scotland, William's role in ordering the Massacre of Glencoe remains notorious. William's lack of children and the death in 1700 of his nephew the Duke of Gloucester threatened the Protestant succession. The danger was averted by placing William and Mary's cousins, the Protestant House of Hanover, in line to the throne after Mary's sister Anne with the Act of Settlement 1701. Upon his death in 1702, William was succeeded in his kingdoms by Anne and as titular Prince of Orange by his cousin John William Friso.

== Early life ==
=== Birth and family ===
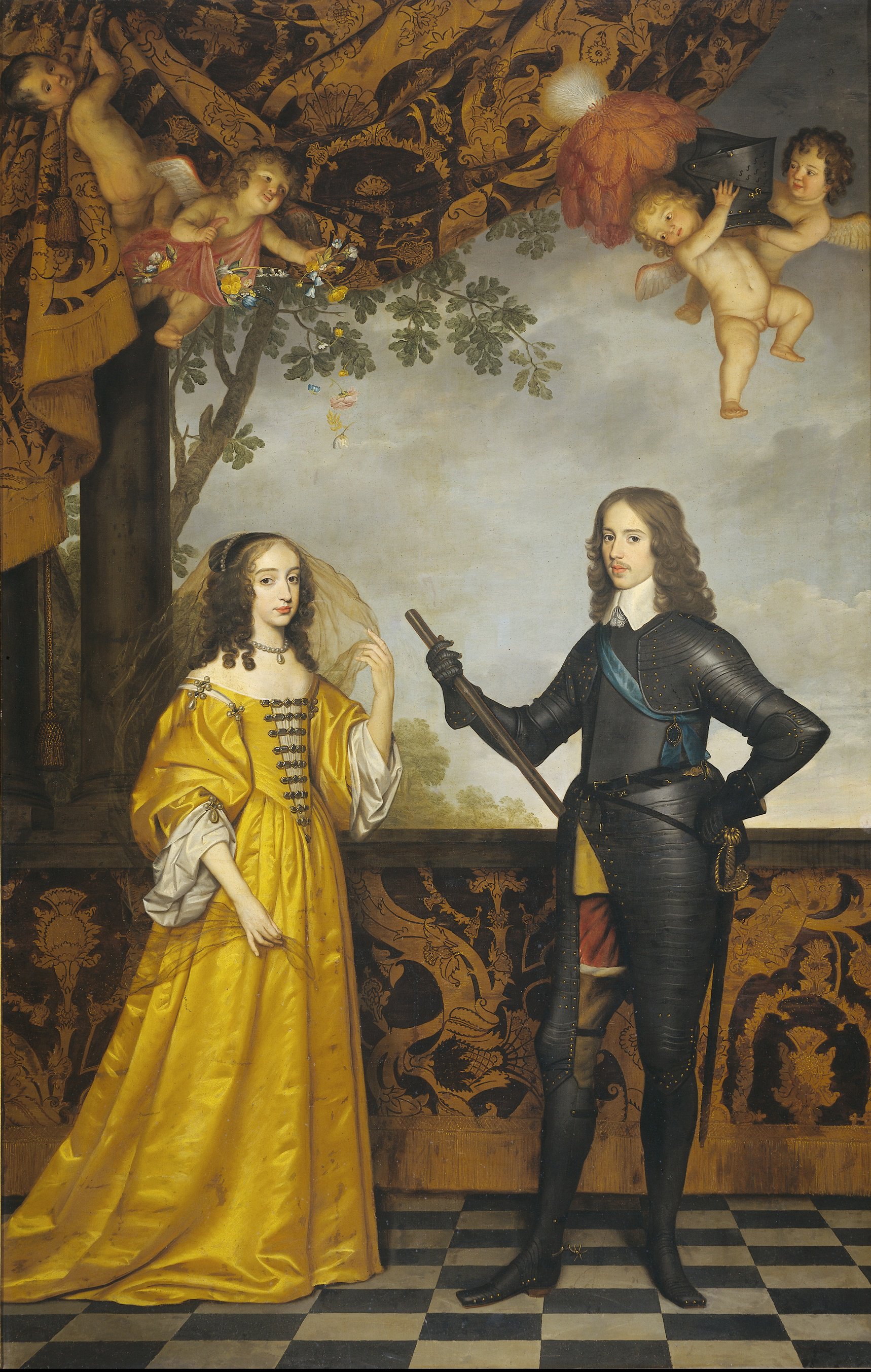
William's parents, William II of Orange and Mary, Princess Royal, 1647

William III and II was born on 4 November 1650 in The Hague in the Dutch Republic. Baptised William Henry (Dutch: Willem Hendrik), he was the only child of Mary, Princess Royal, and stadtholder William II, Prince of Orange. Mary was the elder daughter of King Charles I of England, Scotland and Ireland and sister of kings Charles II and James II and VII.

Eight days before William was born, his father died of smallpox; thus, William was the sovereign Prince of Orange from the moment of his birth. Immediately, a conflict arose between his mother and his paternal grandmother, Amalia of Solms-Braunfels, over the name to be given to the infant. Mary wanted to name him Charles after her brother, but her mother-in-law insisted on giving him the name William (Willem) to bolster his prospects of becoming stadtholder. William II had intended to appoint his wife as their son's guardian in his will; however, the document remained unsigned at William II's death and was therefore void. On 13 August 1651, the Hoge Raad van Holland en Zeeland (Supreme Court) ruled that guardianship would be shared between his mother, his grandmother and Frederick William, Elector of Brandenburg, husband of his paternal aunt Louise Henriette. (Note: Frederick William was chosen because he could act as a neutral party mediating between the two women, but also because as a possible heir he was interested in protecting the Orange family fortune, which Amalia feared Mary would squander. Troost, pp. 26–27.)

=== Childhood and education ===
William's mother showed little personal interest in her son, sometimes being absent for years, and had always deliberately kept herself apart from Dutch society. William's education was first laid in the hands of several Dutch governesses, some of English descent, including Walburg Howard and the Scottish noblewoman Lady Anna Mackenzie. From April 1656, the Prince received daily instruction in the Reformed religion from the Calvinist preacher Cornelis Trigland, a follower of the Contra-Remonstrant theologian Gisbertus Voetius.

The ideal education for William was described in Discours sur la nourriture de S. H. Monseigneur le Prince d'Orange, a short treatise, perhaps by one of William's tutors, Constantijn Huygens. In these lessons, the Prince was taught that he was predestined to become an instrument of Divine Providence, fulfilling the historical destiny of the House of Orange-Nassau. William was seen, despite his youth, as the leader of the "Orangist" party, heir to the stadholderships of several provinces and the office of Captain-General of the Union (see Politics and government of the Dutch Republic). He was viewed as the leader of the nation in its independence movement and its protector from foreign threats. This was in the tradition of the princes of Orange before him: his great-grandfather William the Silent, his grand-uncle Maurice, his grandfather Frederick Henry, and his father William II.

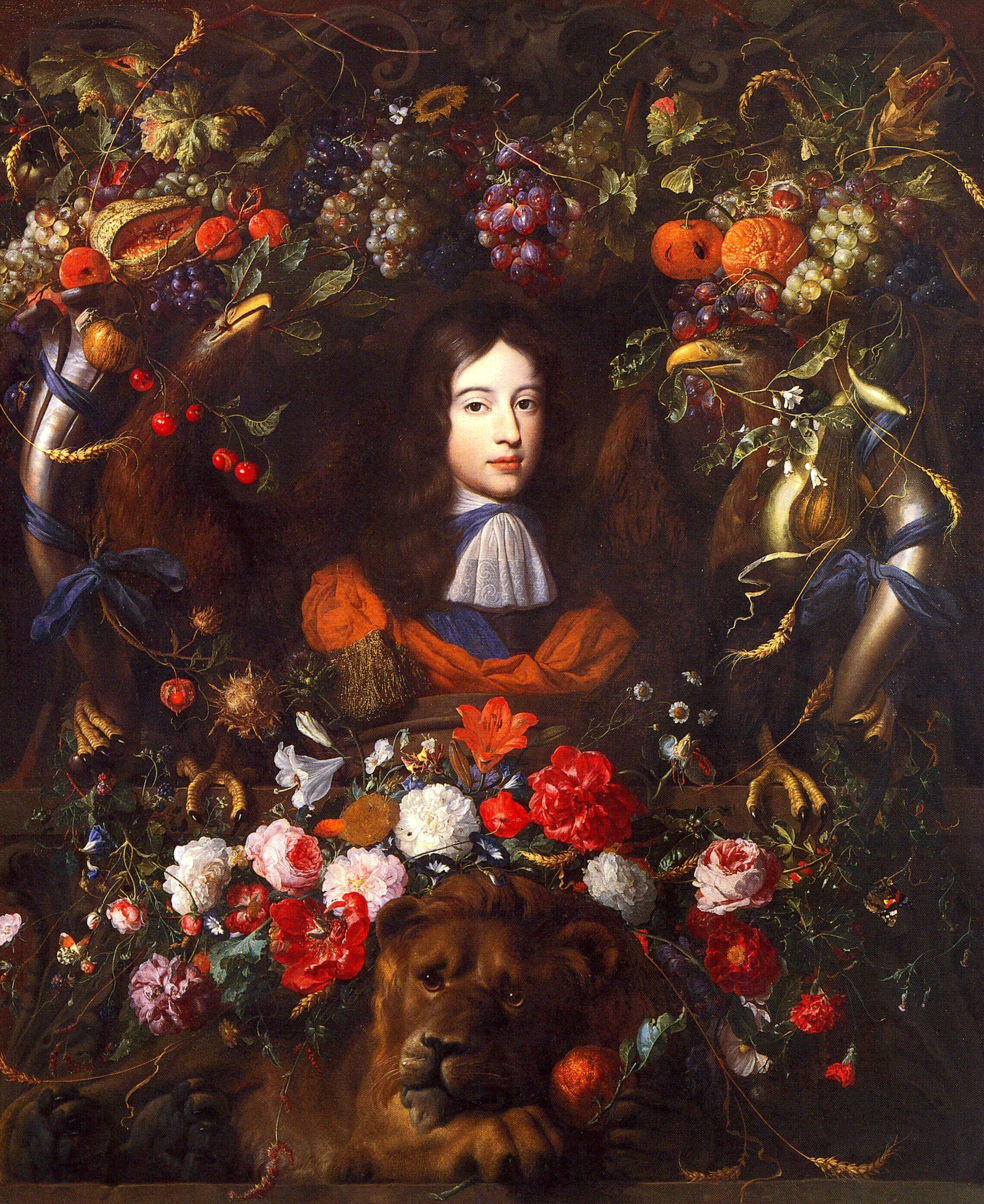
The young prince portrayed by Jan Davidsz de Heem and Jan Vermeer van Utrecht within a flower garland filled with symbols of the House of Orange-Nassau, c. 1660

From early 1659, William spent seven years at the University of Leiden for a formal education, under the guidance of ethics professor Hendrik Bornius (though never officially enrolling as a student). While residing in the Prinsenhof at Delft, William had a small personal retinue including Hans Willem Bentinck, and a new governor, Frederick Nassau de Zuylenstein, who (as an illegitimate son of stadtholder Frederick Henry of Orange) was his paternal uncle.

Grand Pensionary Johan de Witt and his uncle Cornelis de Graeff pushed the States of Holland to take charge of William's education and ensure that he would acquire the skills to serve in a future—though undetermined—state function; the States acted on 25 September 1660. Around this time, the young prince played with De Graeff's sons Pieter and Jacob de Graeff in the park of the country house in Soestdijk. In 1674 Wilhelm bought the estate from Jacob de Graeff, which was later converted into Soestdijk Palace. This first involvement of the authorities did not last long. On 23 December 1660, when William was ten years old, his mother died of smallpox at Whitehall Palace, London, while visiting her brother, the recently restored King Charles II. In her will, Mary requested that Charles look after William's interests, and Charles now demanded that the States of Holland end their interference. To appease Charles, they complied on 30 September 1661. That year, Zuylenstein began to work for Charles and induced William to write letters to his uncle asking him to help William become stadtholder someday. After his mother's death, William's education and guardianship became a point of contention between his dynasty's supporters and the advocates of a more republican Netherlands.

The Dutch authorities did their best at first to ignore these intrigues, but in the Second Anglo-Dutch War, one of Charles's peace conditions was the improvement of the position of his nephew. As a countermeasure in 1666, when William was sixteen, the States officially made him a ward of the government, or a "Child of State". All pro-English courtiers, including Zuylenstein, were removed from William's company. William begged de Witt to allow Zuylenstein to stay, but he refused. De Witt, the leading politician of the Republic, took William's education into his own hands, instructing him weekly in state matters and joining him for regular games of real tennis.

== Early offices ==
=== Exclusion from stadtholdership ===
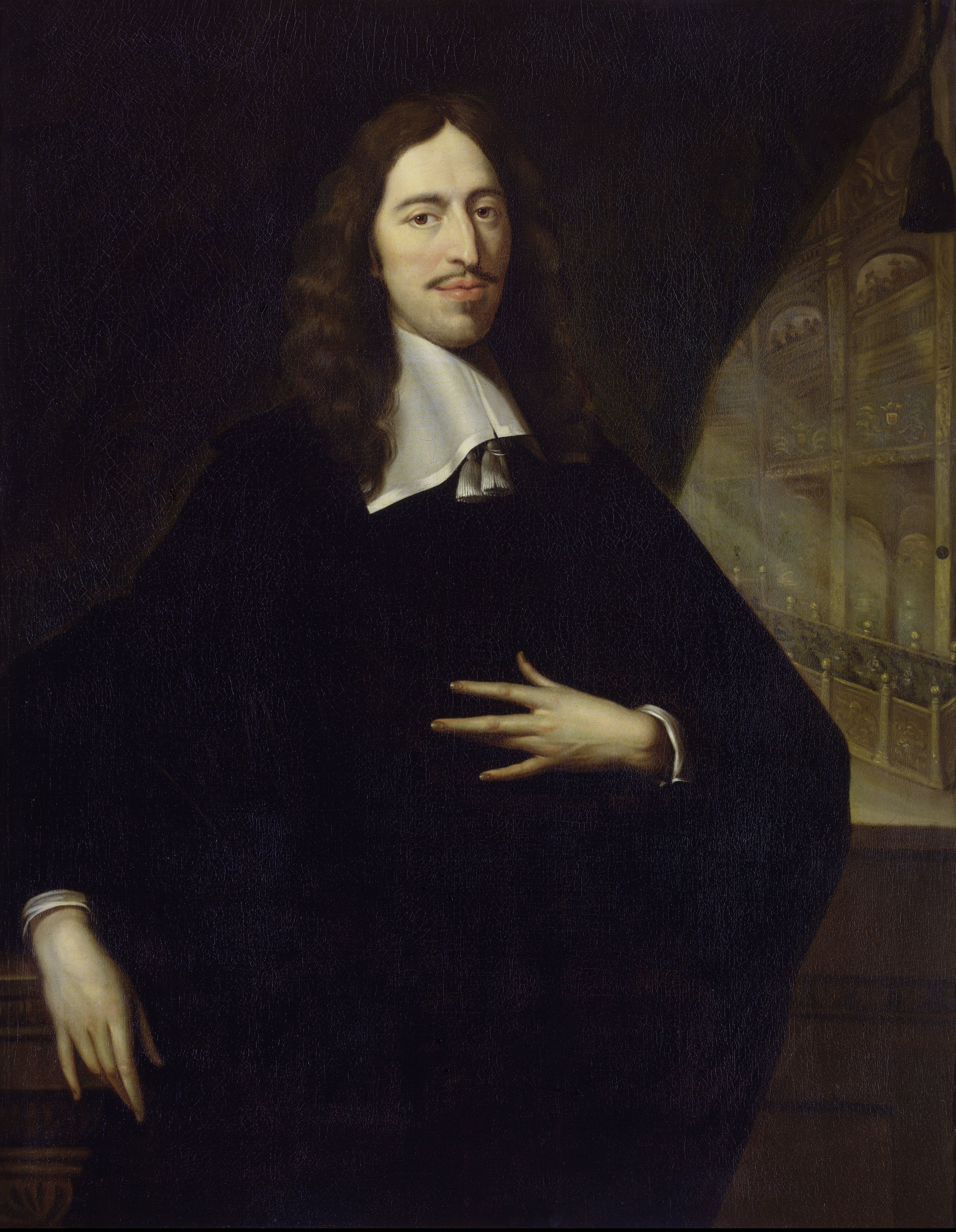
Johan de Witt took over William's education in 1666.

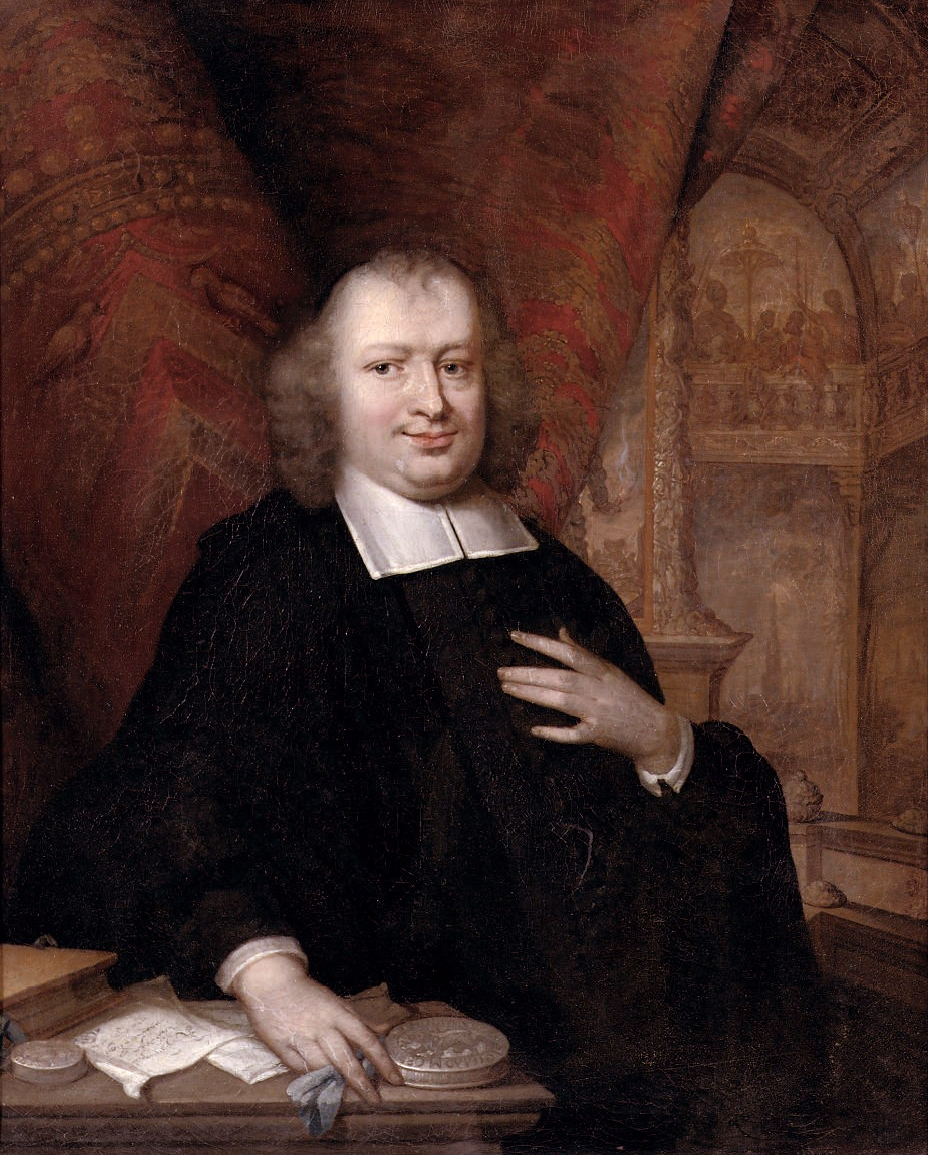
Gaspar Fagel replaced de Witt as grand pensionary, and was more friendly to William's interests.

After the death of William's father, most provinces had left the office of stadtholder vacant. (Note: In the province of Friesland that office was filled by William's uncle-by-marriage William Frederick, Prince of Nassau-Dietz.) At the demand of Oliver Cromwell, the Treaty of Westminster, which ended the First Anglo-Dutch War, had a secret annexe that required the Act of Seclusion, which forbade the province of Holland from appointing a member of the House of Orange as stadtholder. After the English Restoration, the Act of Seclusion, which had not remained a secret for long, was declared void as the English Commonwealth (with which the treaty had been concluded) no longer existed. In 1660, William's mother Mary and grandmother Amalia tried to persuade several provincial States to designate William as their future stadtholder, but they all initially refused.

In 1667, as William approached the age of 18, the Orangist party again attempted to bring him to power by securing for him the offices of stadtholder and Captain-General. To prevent the restoration of the influence of the House of Orange, de Witt, the leader of the States Party, allowed the pensionary of Haarlem, Gaspar Fagel, to induce the States of Holland to issue the Perpetual Edict. The Edict, supported by the important Amsterdam politicians Andries de Graeff and Gillis Valckenier, declared that the Captain-General or Admiral-General of the Netherlands could not serve as stadtholder in any province. Even so, William's supporters sought ways to enhance his prestige and, on 19 September 1668, the States of Zeeland appointed him as First Noble. To receive this honour, William had to escape the attention of his state tutors and travel secretly to Middelburg. A month later, Amalia allowed William to manage his own household and declared him to be of majority age.

The province of Holland, the centre of anti-Orangism, abolished the office of stadtholder, and four other provinces followed suit in March 1670, establishing the so-called "Harmony". De Witt demanded an oath from each Holland regent (city council member) to uphold the Edict; all but one complied. William saw all this as a defeat, but the arrangement was a compromise: De Witt would have preferred to ignore the Prince completely, but now his eventual rise to the office of supreme army commander was implicit. De Witt further conceded that William would be admitted as a member of the Raad van State, the Council of State, then the generality organ administering the defence budget. William was introduced to the council on 31 May 1670 with full voting rights, despite de Witt's attempts to limit his role to that of an advisor.

=== Conflict with republicans ===
In November 1670, William obtained permission to travel to England to urge Charles to pay back at least a part of the 2,797,859 guilder debt the House of Stuart owed the House of Orange. Charles was unable to pay, but William agreed to reduce the amount owed to 1,800,000 guilders. Charles found his nephew to be a dedicated Calvinist and patriotic Dutchman and reconsidered his desire to show him the Secret Treaty of Dover with France, directed at destroying the Dutch Republic and installing William as "sovereign" of a Dutch rump state. In addition to differing political outlooks, William found that his lifestyle differed from his uncles Charles and James, who were more concerned with drinking, gambling, and cavorting with mistresses.

The following year, the Republic's security deteriorated quickly as an Anglo-French attack became imminent. In view of the threat, the States of Gelderland wanted William to be appointed Captain-General of the Dutch States Army as soon as possible, despite his youth and inexperience. On 15 December 1671, the States of Utrecht made this their official policy. On 19 January 1672, the States of Holland made a counterproposal: to appoint William for just a single campaign. The Prince refused this and on 25 February a compromise was reached: an appointment by the States General for one summer, followed by a permanent appointment on his 22nd birthday.

Meanwhile, William had written a secret letter to Charles in January 1672 asking his uncle to exploit the situation by exerting pressure on the States to appoint William stadtholder. In return, William would ally the Republic with England and serve Charles's interests as much as his "honour and the loyalty due to this state" allowed. Charles took no action on the proposal, and continued his war plans with his French ally.

== Becoming stadtholder ==
=== "Disaster year" and Franco-Dutch War ===
Stadtholderate of William III
- 1672–1702
First Stadtholderless Period	Second Stadtholderless Period
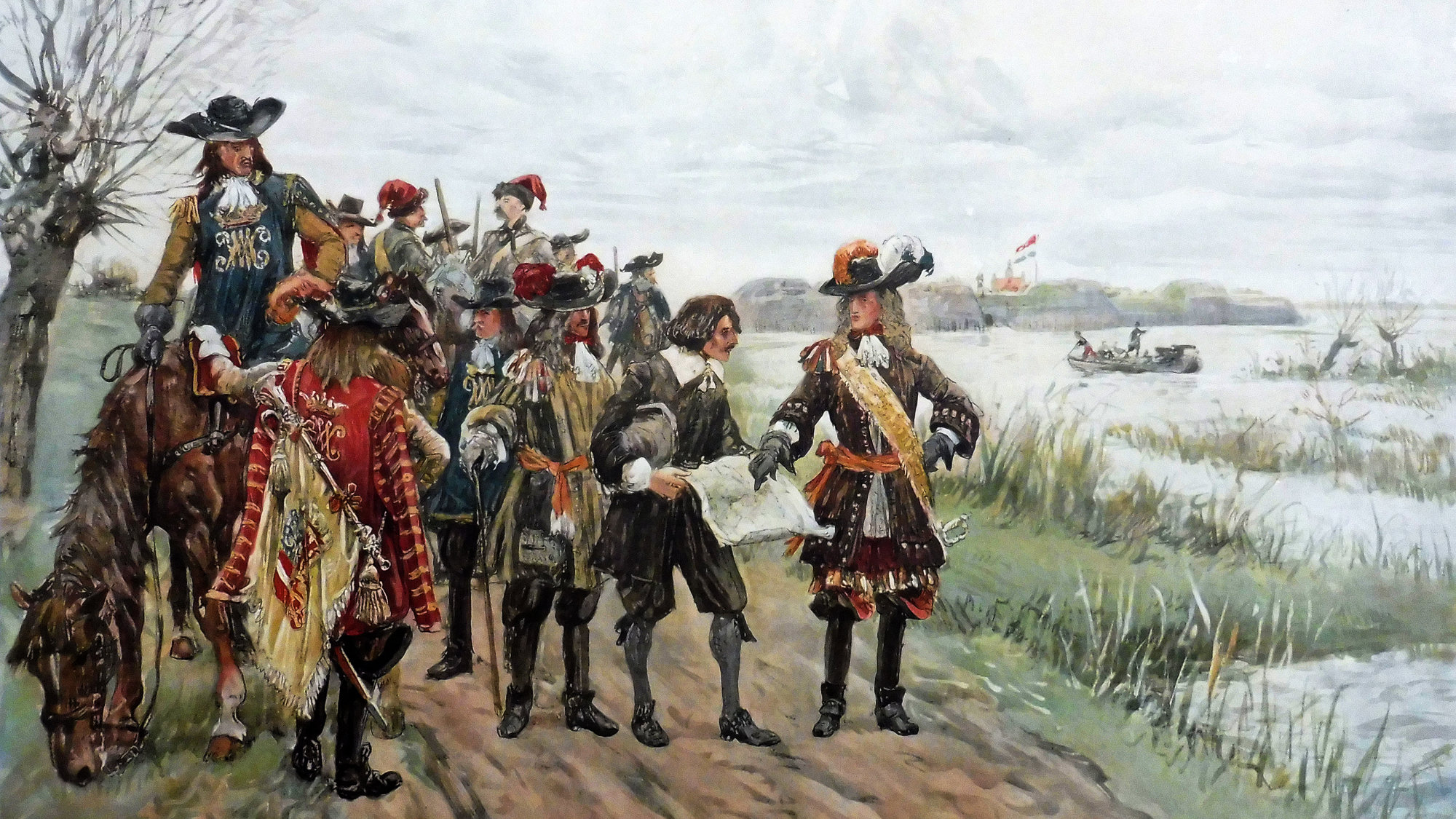
- William inspects the Dutch Waterline

For the Dutch Republic, 1672 proved calamitous. It became known as the Rampjaar ("disaster year") because in the Franco-Dutch War and the Third Anglo-Dutch War, the Netherlands was invaded by France and its allies: England, Münster, and Cologne. Although the Anglo-French fleet was disabled by the Battle of Solebay, in June the French Army quickly overran the provinces of Gelderland and Utrecht. On 14 June, William withdrew with the remnants of his field army into Holland, where the States had ordered the flooding of the Dutch Waterline on 8 June. Louis XIV of France, believing the war was over, began negotiations to extract as large a sum of money from the Dutch as possible. The presence of a large French army in the heart of the Republic caused a general panic, and the people turned against de Witt and his allies.

On 4 July, the States of Holland appointed William stadtholder, and he took the oath five days later. The next day, a special envoy from Charles II, Lord Arlington, met William in Nieuwerbrug and presented a proposal from Charles. In return for William's capitulation to England and France, Charles would make William Sovereign Prince of Holland, instead of stadtholder (a mere civil servant). When William refused, Arlington threatened that William would witness the end of the Republic's existence. William answered famously: "There is one way to avoid this: to die defending it in the last ditch." On 7 July, the inundations were complete and the further advance of the French army was effectively blocked. On 16 July, Zeeland offered the stadtholdership to William.

Johan de Witt had been unable to function as Grand Pensionary after being wounded by an attempt on his life on 21 June. On 15 August, William published a letter from Charles, in which the English king stated that he had made war because of the aggression of the de Witt faction. The people thus incited, de Witt and his brother, Cornelis, were brutally murdered by an Orangist civil militia in The Hague on 20 August. Subsequently, William replaced many of the Dutch regents with his followers.

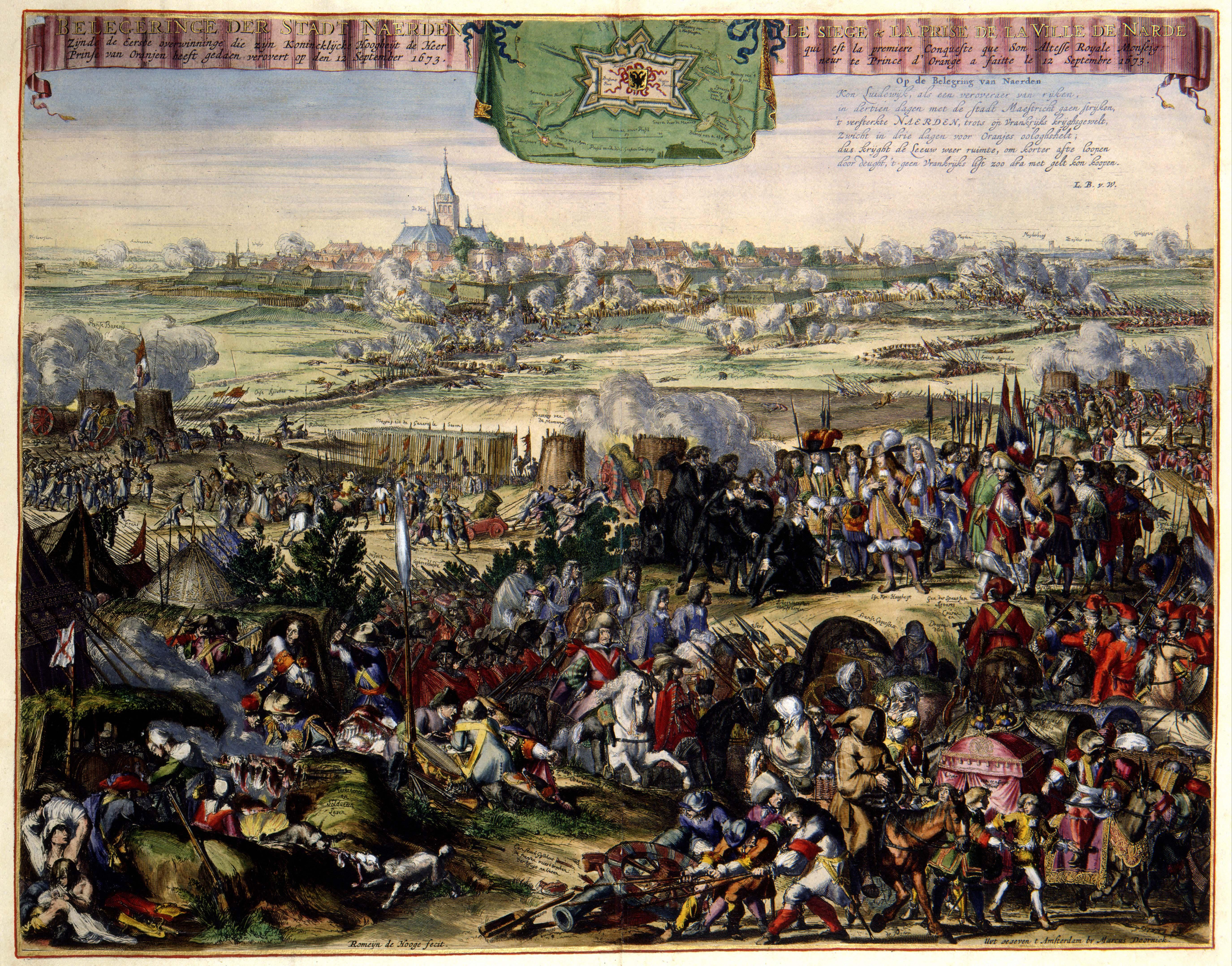
Recapture of Naarden by William of Orange in 1673

Though William's complicity in the lynching has never been proven (and some 19th-century Dutch historians have made an effort to disprove that he was an accessory), he thwarted attempts to prosecute the ringleaders, and even rewarded some, like Hendrik Verhoeff, with money, and others, like Johan van Banchem and Johan Kievit, with high offices. This damaged his reputation in the same fashion as his later actions at Glencoe.

William continued to fight against the invaders from England and France, allying himself with Spain, Brandenburg, and Leopold I, Holy Roman Emperor. In November 1672, he took his army to Maastricht to threaten the French supply lines and then attacked Charleroi. In September 1673, the Dutch situation further improved. The resolute defence by John Maurice of Nassau-Siegen and Hans Willem van Aylva in the north of the Dutch Republic finally forced the troops of Münster and Cologne to withdraw, while William crossed the Dutch Waterline and recaptured Naarden. In November, a 30,000-strong Dutch-Spanish army, under William's command, marched into the lands of the Bishops of Münster and Cologne. The Dutch troops took revenge and carried out many atrocities. Together with 35,000 Imperial troops, they then captured Bonn, an important magazine in the long logistical lines between France and the Dutch Republic. The French position in the Netherlands became untenable and Louis was forced to evacuate French troops. This deeply shocked Louis and he retreated to Saint Germain where no one, except a few intimates, were allowed to disturb him. The next year only Grave and Maastricht remained in French hands.

Fagel now proposed to treat the liberated provinces of Utrecht, Gelderland and Overijssel as conquered territory (Generality Lands), as punishment for their quick surrender to the enemy. William refused but obtained a special mandate from the States General to appoint all delegates in the States of these provinces anew. William's followers in the States of Utrecht on 26 April 1674 appointed him hereditary stadtholder. On 30 January 1675, the States of Gelderland offered him the titles of Duke of Guelders and Count of Zutphen. The negative reactions to this from Zeeland and the city of Amsterdam made William ultimately decide to decline these honours; he was instead appointed stadtholder of Gelderland and Overijssel. Baruch Spinoza's warning in his Political Treatise of 1677 of the need to organize the state so that the citizens maintain control over the sovereign was an influential expression of this unease with the concentration of power in one person.

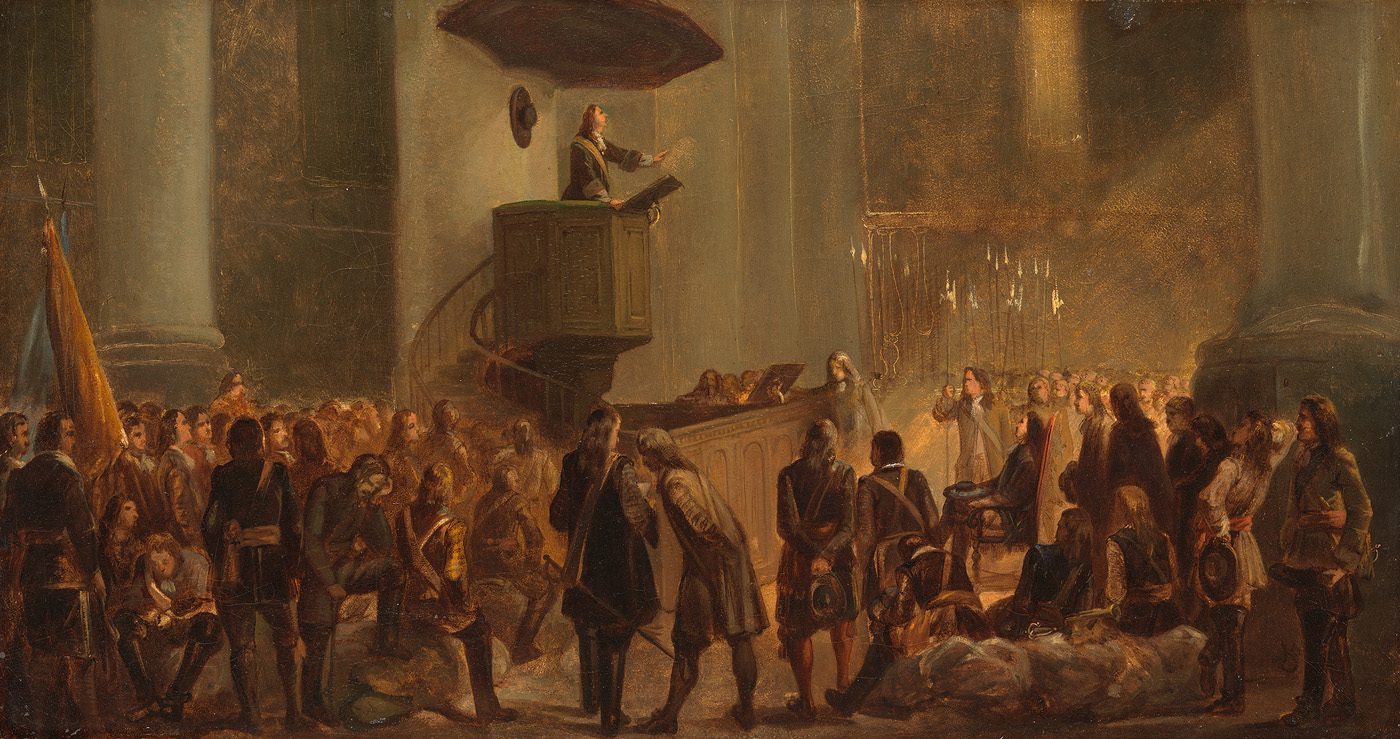
The thanksgiving service of William's army in Grave after its capture

Meanwhile, the front of the war against France had shifted to the Spanish Netherlands. In 1674, Allied forces in the Netherlands were numerically superior to the French army under Condé, which was based along the Piéton river near Charleroi. William took the offensive and sought to bring on a battle by outflanking the French positions but the broken ground forced him to divide his army into three separate columns. At Seneffe, Condé led a cavalry attack against the Allied vanguard and by midday on 11 August had halted their advance. Against the advice of his subordinates, he then ordered a series of frontal assaults which led to very heavy casualties on both sides with no concrete result. William and the Dutch blamed the Imperial commander, Jean-Louis Raduit de Souches, and after a failed attempt to capture Oudenaarde, largely due to obstructionism from de Souches, he was relieved of command. Frustrated, William joined the army under Carl von Rabenhaupt with 10,000 troops instead of campaigning further in the Spanish Netherlands. He assumed command of operations at Grave, which had been besieged since 28 June. Grave surrendered on 27 October. The Dutch were split by internal disputes; the powerful Amsterdam mercantile body was anxious to end an expensive war once their commercial interests were secured, while William saw France as a long-term threat that had to be defeated. This conflict increased once ending the war became a distinct possibility when Grave was captured in October 1674, leaving only Maastricht.

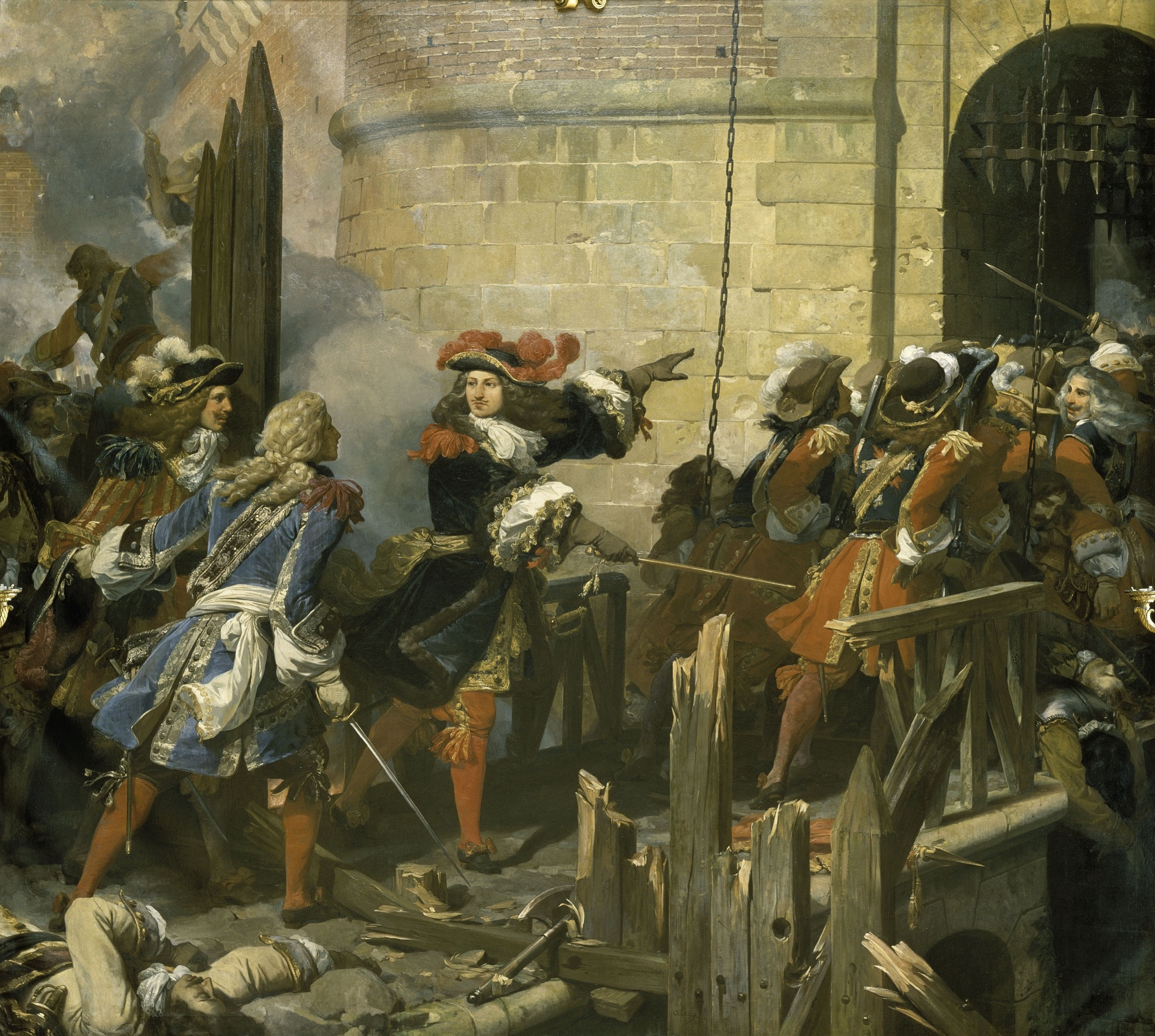
The Capture of Valenciennes by the French

On both sides, the last years of the war saw minimal return for their investment of men and money. The French were preparing a major offensive, however, at the end of 1676. Intended to capture Valenciennes, Cambrai and Saint-Omer in the Spanish Netherlands. Louis believed this would deprive the Dutch regents of the courage to continue the war any longer. In this, however, he was mistaken. The impending French offensive actually led to an intensification of Dutch-Spanish cooperation. Still, the French offensive of 1677 was a success. The Spaniards found it difficult to raise enough troops due to financial constraints and the Allies were defeated in the Battle of Cassel. This meant that they could not prevent the cities from falling into French hands. The French then took a defensive posture, afraid that more success would force England to intervene on the side of the Allies.

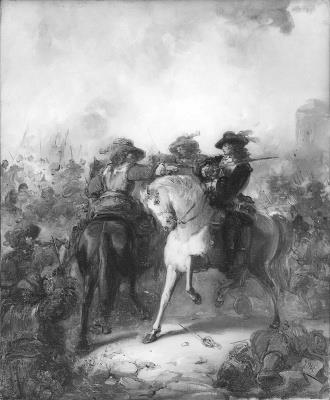
Hendrik Overkirk saves William of Orange from a French dragoon at the Battle of Saint-Denis, by Jacob de Vos

The peace talks that began at Nijmegen in 1676 were given a greater sense of urgency in November 1677 when William married his cousin Mary, Charles II of England's niece. An Anglo-Dutch defensive alliance followed in March 1678, although English troops did not arrive in significant numbers until late May. Louis seized this opportunity to improve his negotiating position and captured Ypres and Ghent in early March, before signing a peace treaty with the Dutch on 10 August.

The Battle of Saint-Denis was fought three days later on 13 August, when a combined Dutch-Spanish force under William attacked the French army under Luxembourg. Luxembourg withdrew and William thus ensured Mons would remain in Spanish hands. On 19 August, Spain and France agreed an armistice, followed by a formal peace treaty on 17 September.

The war had seen the rebirth of the Dutch States Army as one of the most disciplined and best-trained European armed forces. This had not been enough to keep France from making conquests in the Spanish Netherlands, which William and the regents blamed mainly on the Spaniards; the Dutch expected the once powerful Spanish Empire to have more military strength.

=== Marriage ===
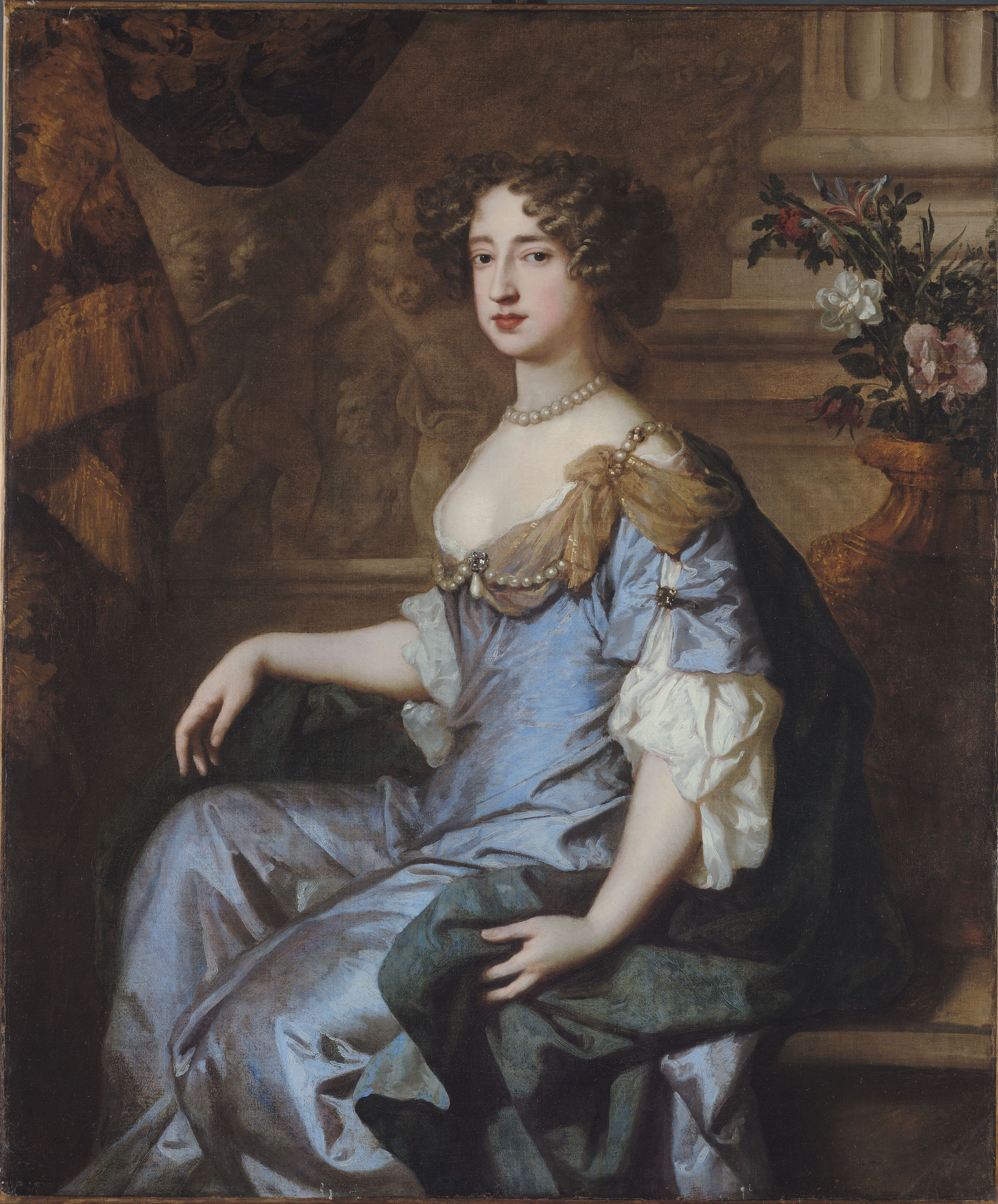
William married his first cousin, the future Queen Mary II, in 1677.

During the war with France, William tried to improve his position by marrying, in 1677, his first cousin Mary, elder surviving daughter of the Duke of York, later King James II of England (James VII of Scotland). Mary was eleven years his junior and he anticipated resistance to a Stuart match from the Amsterdam merchants who had disliked his mother (another Mary Stuart), but William believed that marrying Mary would increase his chances of succeeding to Charles's kingdoms, and would draw England's monarch away from his pro-French policies. James was not inclined to consent, but Charles II pressured his brother to agree. Charles wanted to use the possibility of marriage to gain leverage in negotiations relating to the war, but William insisted that the two issues be decided separately. Charles relented, and Bishop Henry Compton married the couple on 4 November 1677. Mary became pregnant soon after the marriage, but miscarried. After a further illness later in 1678, she never conceived again.

Throughout William and Mary's marriage, William had only one reputed mistress, Elizabeth Villiers, in contrast to the many mistresses his uncles openly kept.

=== Tensions with France, intrigue with England ===
By 1678, Louis XIV sought peace with the Dutch Republic. Even so, tensions remained: William remained suspicious of Louis, thinking that the French king desired "universal kingship" over Europe; Louis described William as "my mortal enemy" and saw him as an obnoxious warmonger. France's annexations in the Southern Netherlands and Germany (the Réunion policy) and the revocation of the Edict of Nantes in 1685, caused a surge of Huguenot refugees to the Republic. This led William to join various anti-French alliances, such as the Association League, and ultimately the League of Augsburg (an anti-French coalition that also included the Habsburg monarchy, Sweden, Spain and several German states) in 1686.

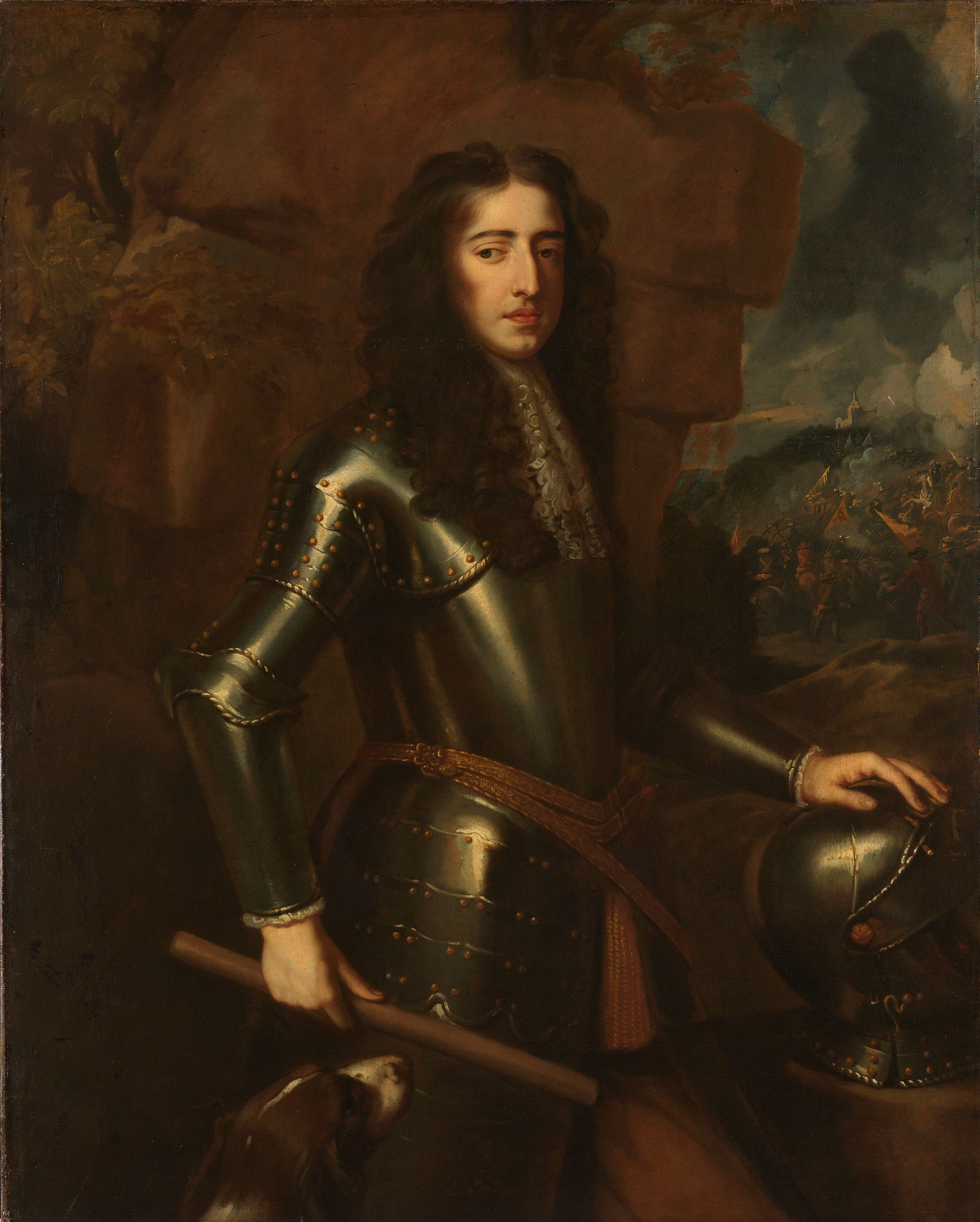
Portrait of William, aged 27, in the manner of Willem Wissing after a prototype by Sir Peter Lely

After his marriage in November 1677, William became a strong candidate for the English throne should his father-in-law (and uncle) James be excluded because of his Catholicism. During the crisis concerning the Exclusion Bill in 1680, Charles at first invited William to come to England to bolster the King's position against the exclusionists, then withdrew his invitation—after which Lord Sunderland also tried unsuccessfully to bring William over, but now to put pressure on Charles. Nevertheless, William secretly induced the States General to send Charles the "Insinuation", a plea beseeching the King to prevent any Catholics from succeeding him, without explicitly naming James. After receiving indignant reactions from Charles and James, William denied any involvement.

In 1685, when James II succeeded Charles, William at first attempted a conciliatory approach, at the same time trying not to offend the Protestants in England. William, ever looking for ways to diminish the power of France, hoped that James would join the League of Augsburg, but by 1687 it became clear that James would not join the anti-French alliance. Relations worsened between William and James thereafter. In November, James's second wife, Mary of Modena, was announced to be pregnant. That month, to gain the favour of English Protestants, William wrote an open letter to the English people in which he disapproved of James's pro-Roman Catholic policy of religious toleration. Seeing him as a friend, and often having maintained secret contacts with him for years, many English politicians began to urge an armed invasion of England.

== Glorious Revolution ==
=== Invasion of England ===
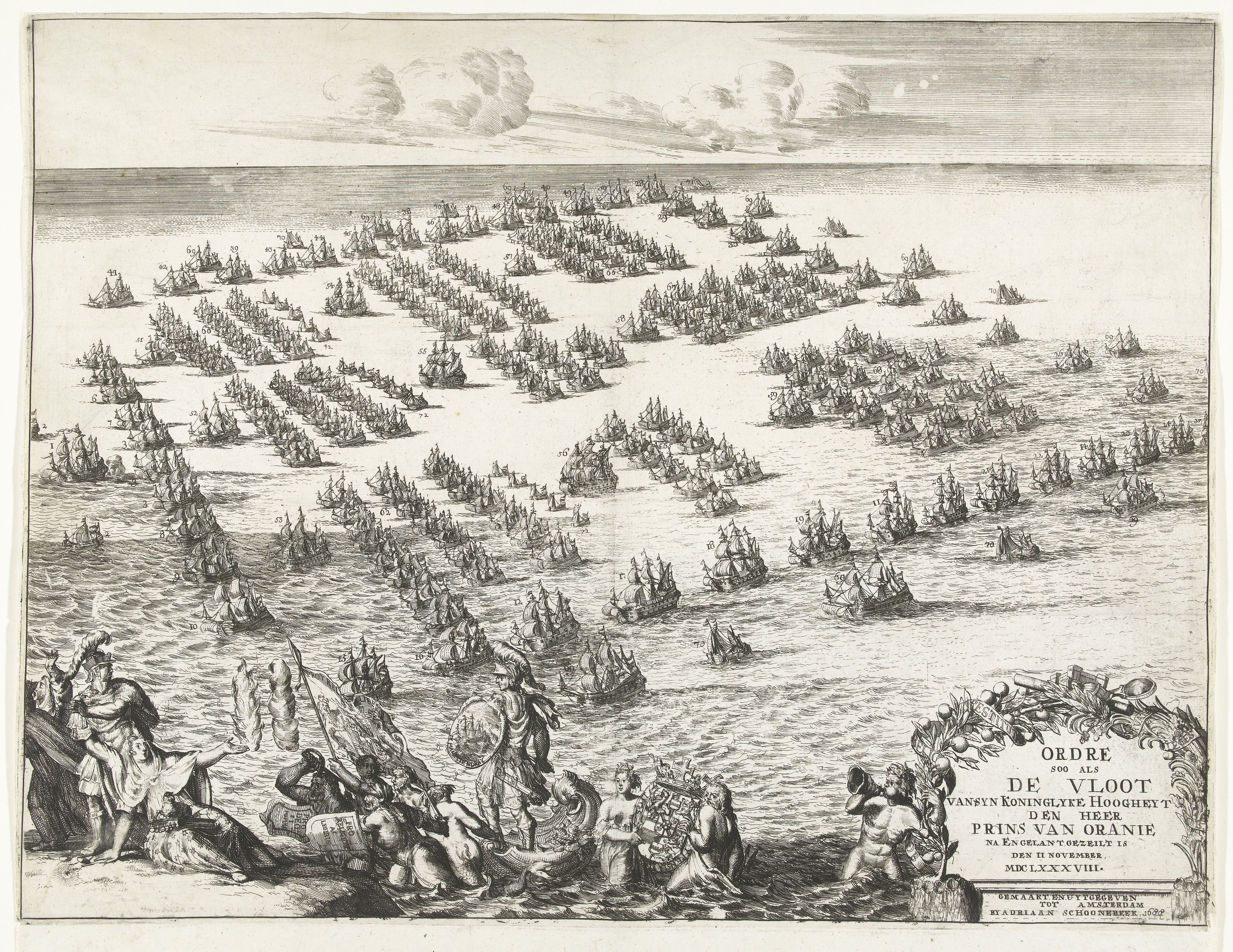
The formation of the Dutch fleet that sailed for England with more than 450 ships, more than twice the size of the Spanish Armada of 1588

William at first opposed the prospect of invasion, but most historians now agree that he began to assemble an expeditionary force in April 1688, as it became increasingly clear that France would remain occupied by campaigns in Germany and Italy, and thus unable to mount an attack while William's troops would be occupied in Britain. Believing that the English people would not react well to a foreign invader, he demanded in a letter to Rear-Admiral Arthur Herbert that the most eminent English Protestants first invite him to invade. In June, Mary of Modena, after a string of miscarriages, gave birth to a son, James Francis Edward Stuart, who displaced William's Protestant wife to become first in the line of succession and raised the prospect of an ongoing Catholic monarchy. Public anger also increased because of the trial of seven bishops who had publicly opposed James's Declaration of Indulgence granting religious liberty to his subjects, a policy which appeared to threaten the establishment of the Church of England.

On 30 June 1688—the same day the bishops were acquitted—a group of political figures, known afterward as the "Immortal Seven", sent William a formal invitation. William's intentions to invade were public knowledge by September 1688. With a Dutch army, William landed at Brixham in southwest England on 5 November 1688. He came ashore from the ship Den Briel, proclaiming "the liberties of England and the Protestant religion I will maintain". William's fleet was vastly larger than the Spanish Armada 100 years earlier: approximately consisting of 463 ships with 40,000 men on board, including 9,500 sailors, 11,000 foot soldiers, 4,000 cavalry and 5,000 English and Huguenot volunteers. James's support began to dissolve almost immediately upon William's arrival; Protestant officers defected from the English Army (the most notable of whom was Lord Churchill of Eyemouth, James's most able commander), and influential noblemen across the country declared their support for the invader.

Arms of William and Mary, as depicted on his invasion banner, 1688

James at first attempted to resist William, but saw that his efforts would prove futile. He sent representatives to negotiate with William, but secretly attempted to flee on 11 December, throwing the Great Seal into the Thames on his way. He was discovered and brought back to London by a group of fishermen. He was allowed to leave for France in a second escape attempt on 23 December. William permitted James to leave the country, not wanting to make him a martyr for the Roman Catholic cause; it was in his interests for James to be perceived as having left the country of his own accord, rather than having been forced or frightened into fleeing. William is the last person to successfully invade England by force of arms.

=== Proclaimed king ===
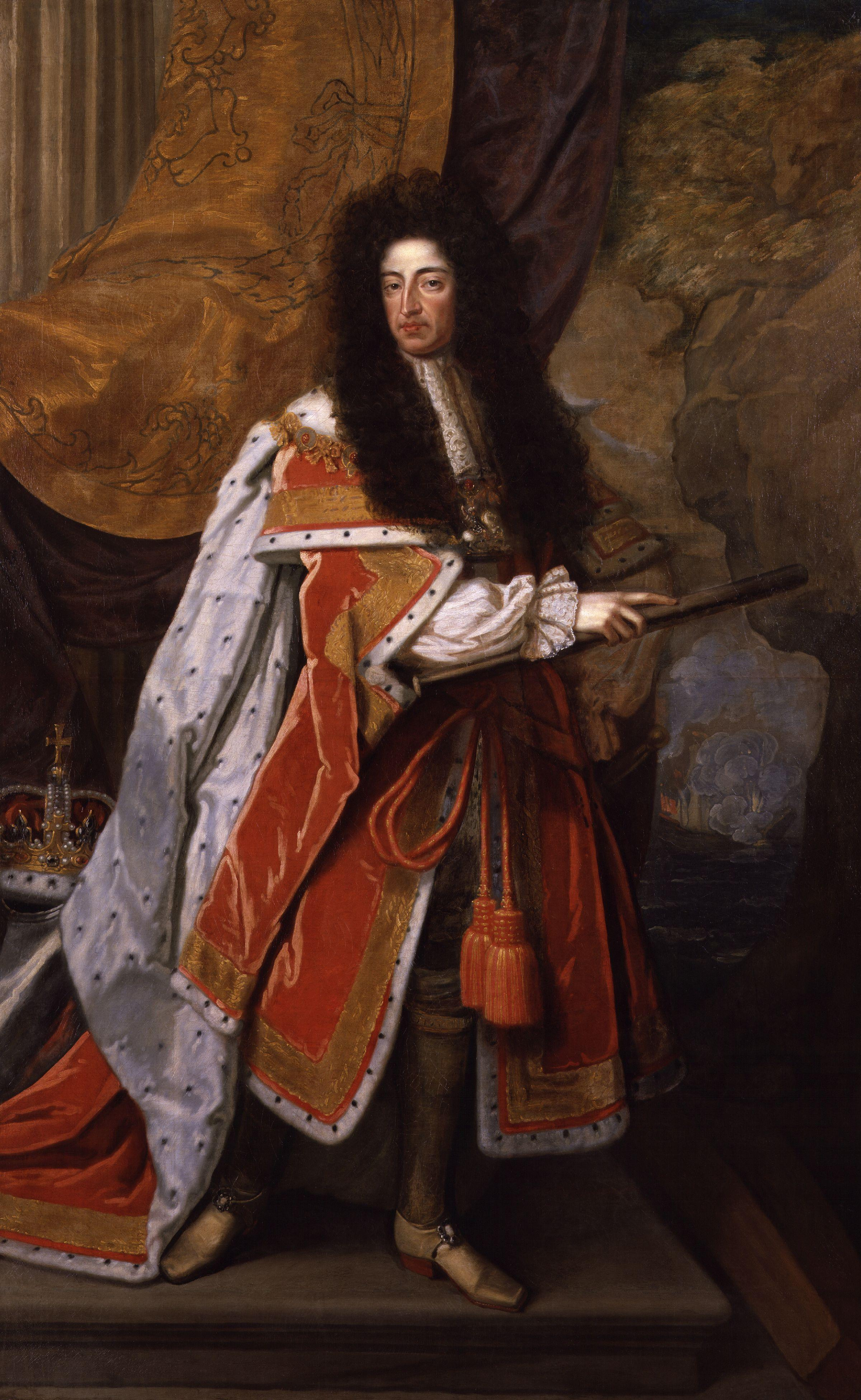
Portrait attributed to Thomas Murray, c. 1690

William summoned a Convention Parliament in England, which met on 22 January 1689, to discuss the appropriate course of action following James's flight. William felt insecure about his position; though his wife preceded him in the line of succession to the throne, he wished to reign as king in his own right, rather than as a mere consort. The only precedent for a joint monarchy in England dated from the 16th century, when Queen Mary I married Philip of Spain. Philip remained king only during his wife's lifetime, and restrictions were placed on his power. William, on the other hand, demanded that he remain as king even after his wife's death, despite Mary's sister, the then-Princess Anne, outranking him in the line of succession. When the majority of Tory Lords proposed to acclaim her as sole ruler, William threatened to leave the country immediately. Furthermore, Mary, remaining loyal to her husband, refused to rule without him.

The House of Commons, with a Whig majority, quickly resolved that the throne was vacant, and that it was safer if the ruler were Protestant. There were more Tories in the House of Lords, which would not initially agree, but after William refused to be a regent or to agree to remain king only in his wife's lifetime, there were negotiations between the two houses and the Lords agreed by a narrow majority that the throne was vacant. On 13 February 1689, Parliament passed the Declaration of Right, in which it deemed that James, by attempting to flee, had abdicated the government of the realm, thereby leaving the throne vacant.

The Crown was not offered to James's infant son, who would have been the heir apparent under normal circumstances, but to William and Mary as joint sovereigns. It was, however, provided that "the sole and full exercise of the regal power be only in and executed by the said Prince of Orange in the names of the said Prince and Princess during their joint lives".

William and Mary were crowned together at Westminster Abbey on 11 April 1689 by the Bishop of London, Henry Compton. Normally, the coronation is performed by the Archbishop of Canterbury, but the Archbishop at the time, William Sancroft, refused to recognise James's removal.

William also summoned a Convention of the Estates of Scotland, which met on 14 March 1689. He sent it a conciliatory letter, while James sent haughty uncompromising orders, swaying a majority in favour of William. On 11 April, the day of the English coronation, the Convention finally declared that James was no longer King of Scotland. William and Mary were offered the Scottish Crown; they accepted on 11 May.

=== Revolution settlement ===
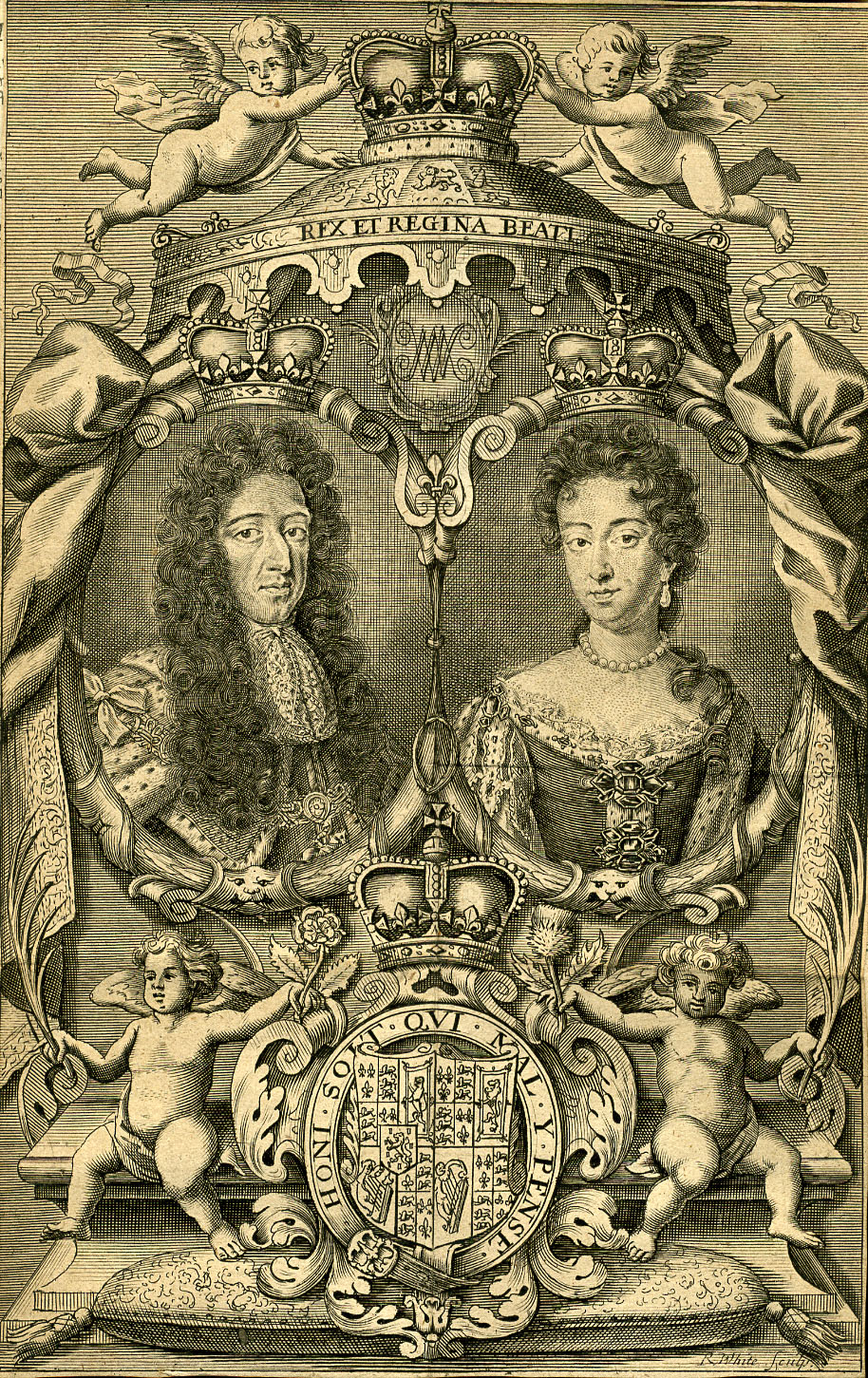
Engraving of William III and Mary II, 1703

William encouraged the passage of the Toleration Act 1689, which guaranteed religious toleration to Protestant nonconformists. It did not, however, extend toleration as far as he wished, still restricting the religious liberty of Roman Catholics, non-trinitarians, and those of non-Christian faiths. In December 1689, one of the most important constitutional documents in English history, the Bill of Rights, was passed. The Act, which restated and confirmed many provisions of the earlier Declaration of Right, established restrictions on the royal prerogative. It provided, amongst other things, that the Sovereign could not suspend laws passed by Parliament, levy taxes without parliamentary consent, infringe the right to petition, raise a standing army during peacetime without parliamentary consent, deny the right to bear arms to Protestant subjects, unduly interfere with parliamentary elections, punish members of either House of Parliament for anything said during debates, require excessive bail or inflict cruel and unusual punishments. William was opposed to the imposition of such constraints, but he chose not to engage in a conflict with Parliament and agreed to abide by the statute.

The Bill of Rights also settled the question of succession to the Crown. After the death of either William or Mary, the other would continue to reign. Next in the line of succession was Mary II's sister, Anne, and her issue, followed by any children William might have had by a subsequent marriage. Roman Catholics, as well as those who married Catholics, were excluded.

== Rule with Mary II ==
=== Jacobite resistance ===
Battle of the Boyne between James II and William III, 12 July 1690, Jan van Huchtenburg

Although most in Britain accepted William and Mary as sovereigns, a significant minority refused to acknowledge their claim to the throne, instead believing in the divine right of kings, which held that the monarch's authority derived directly from God rather than being delegated to the monarch by Parliament. Over the next 57 years Jacobites pressed for restoration of James and his heirs. Nonjurors in England and Scotland, including over 400 clergy and several bishops of the Church of England and Scottish Episcopal Church as well as numerous laymen, refused to take oaths of allegiance to William.

Ireland was controlled by Roman Catholics loyal to James, and Franco-Irish Jacobites arrived from France with French forces in March 1689 to join the war in Ireland and contest Protestant resistance at the Siege of Derry. William sent his navy to the city in July, and his army landed in August. After progress stalled, William personally intervened to lead his armies to victory over James at the Battle of the Boyne on 1 July 1690, (Note: Due to the change to the Gregorian calendar, William's victory is commemorated annually by Northern Irish and Scottish Protestants on The Twelfth of July – cf. Troost, pp. 278–280) after which James fled back to France.

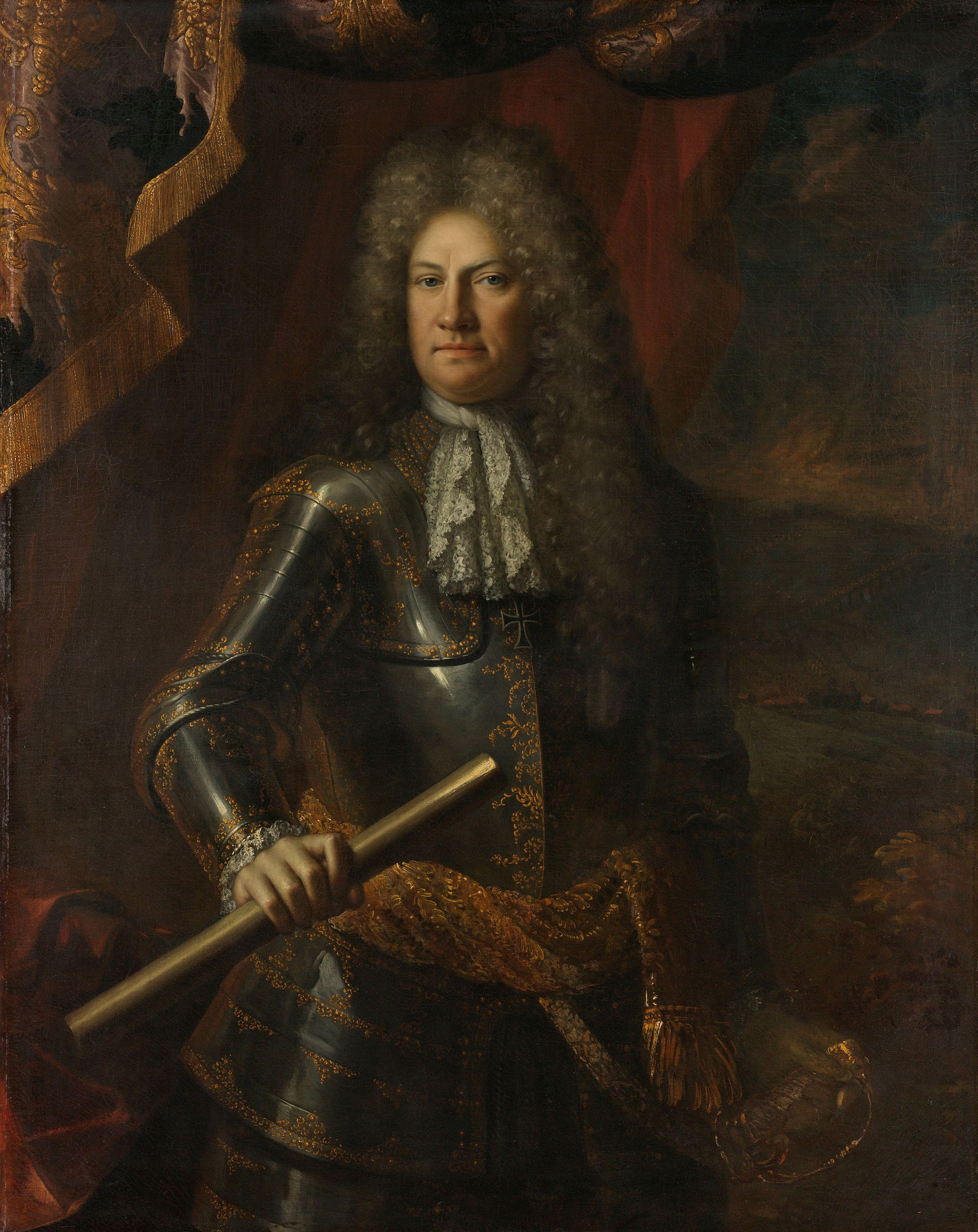
Lieutenant-General Godert de Ginkell successfully commanded the Williamite forces in Ireland after William left.

Upon William's return to England, his close friend Dutch General Godert de Ginkell, who had accompanied William to Ireland and had commanded a body of Dutch cavalry at the Battle of the Boyne, was named Commander in Chief of William's forces in Ireland and entrusted with further conduct of the war there. Ginkell took command in Ireland in the spring of 1691, and following the Battle of Aughrim, succeeded in capturing both Galway and Limerick, thereby effectively suppressing the Jacobite forces in Ireland within a few more months. After difficult negotiations a capitulation was signed on 3 October 1691—the Treaty of Limerick. Thus concluded the Williamite pacification of Ireland, and for his services, the Dutch general received the formal thanks of the House of Commons and was awarded the title of Earl of Athlone by the King.

A series of Jacobite risings also took place in Scotland, where John Graham, 1st Viscount Dundee raised Highland forces and won a victory on 27 July 1689 at the Battle of Killiecrankie, but he died in the fight and a month later Scottish Cameronian forces subdued the rising at the Battle of Dunkeld. William offered Scottish clans that had taken part in the rising a pardon provided that they signed allegiance by a deadline, and his government in Scotland punished a delay with the 1692 Massacre of Glencoe, which became infamous in Jacobite propaganda as William had countersigned the orders. Bowing to public opinion, William dismissed those responsible for the massacre, though they still remained in his favour; in the words of the historian John Dalberg-Acton, "one became a colonel, another a knight, a third a peer, and a fourth an earl."

William's reputation in Scotland suffered further damage when he refused English assistance to the Darien scheme, a Scottish colony (1698–1700) that failed disastrously.

=== Parliament and faction ===
Silver Crown coin, 1695. The Latin inscription is (obverse) GVLIELMVS III DEI GRA[TIA] (reverse) MAG[NAE] BR[ITANNIAE], FRA[NCIAE], ET HIB[ERNIAE] REX 1695. English: "William III, By the grace of God, King of Great Britain, France, and Ireland, 1695." The reverse shows the arms, clockwise from top, of England, Scotland, France, and Ireland, centred on William's personal arms of the House of Orange-Nassau.

Although the Whigs were William's strongest supporters, he initially favoured a policy of balance between the Whigs and Tories. George Savile, 1st Marquess of Halifax, a man known for his ability to chart a moderate political course, gained William's confidence early in his reign. The Whigs, a majority in Parliament, had expected to dominate the government, and were disappointed that William denied them this chance. This "balanced" approach to governance did not last beyond 1690, as the conflicting factions made it impossible for the government to pursue effective policy, and William called for new elections early that year.

After the Parliamentary elections of 1690, William began to favour the Tories, led by Thomas Osborne, 1st Earl of Danby and Daniel Finch, 2nd Earl of Nottingham. While the Tories favoured preserving the King's prerogatives, William found them unaccommodating when he asked Parliament to support his continuing war with France. As a result, William began to prefer the Whig faction known as the Junto. The Whig government was responsible for the creation of the Bank of England following the example of the Bank of Amsterdam. William's decision to grant the Royal Charter in 1694 to the Bank of England, a private institution owned by bankers, is his most relevant economic legacy. It laid the financial foundation of the English takeover of the central role of the Dutch Republic and Bank of Amsterdam in global commerce in the 18th century.

William dissolved Parliament in 1695, and the new Parliament that assembled that year was led by the Whigs. The following year Parliament passed a colonial trade bill.

=== War in Europe ===
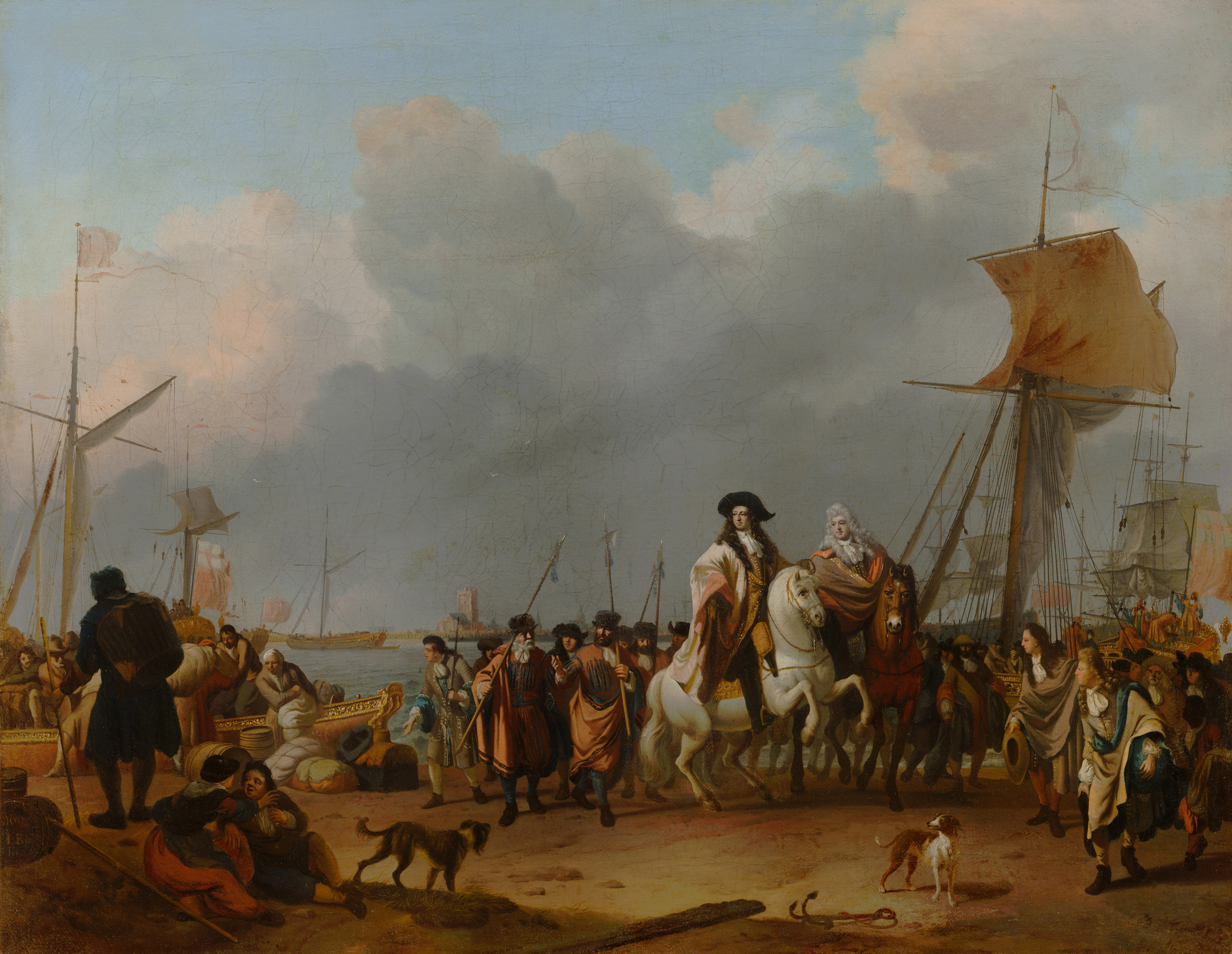
The return of the Stadholder-King in the Dutch Republic on 31 January 1691, by Ludolf Bakhuysen

William continued to absent himself from Britain for extended periods during his Nine Years' War (1688–1697) against France, leaving each spring and returning to England each autumn. England joined the League of Augsburg, which then became known as the Grand Alliance. Whilst William was away fighting, his wife, Mary II, governed the realm, but acted on his advice. Each time he returned to England, Mary gave up her power to him without reservation, an arrangement that lasted for the rest of Mary's life.

After the Anglo-Dutch fleet defeated a French fleet at La Hogue in 1692, the allies controlled the seas for the rest of the conflict, and the Treaty of Limerick (1691) pacified Ireland. At the same time, the Grand Alliance fared poorly in Europe, as William lost Namur in the Spanish Netherlands in 1692. A surprise attack on the French under the command of the Duke of Luxembourg at Steenkerke was repulsed and the French defeated the allies at the Battle of Landen in 1693. However, William managed to inflict such damage on the French in these battles that further major French offensives were ruled out. The following year, the Allies possessed the numerical upper hand in the Low Countries. This enabled William to recapture Huy in 1694. A year later, the Allies achieved their grand success and recaptured Namur from the French. The fortress was considered one of the strongest fortresses in Europe and the conquest was a major blow to Louis XIV's reputation.

=== Economic crisis ===
William's rule led to rapid inflation in England, which caused widespread hunger from 1693 onwards. The Nine Years' War damaged English maritime trade and led to a doubling in taxation. These factors coupled with government mismanagement caused a currency crisis 1695–1697 and a run on the recently created Bank of England.

== Later years ==
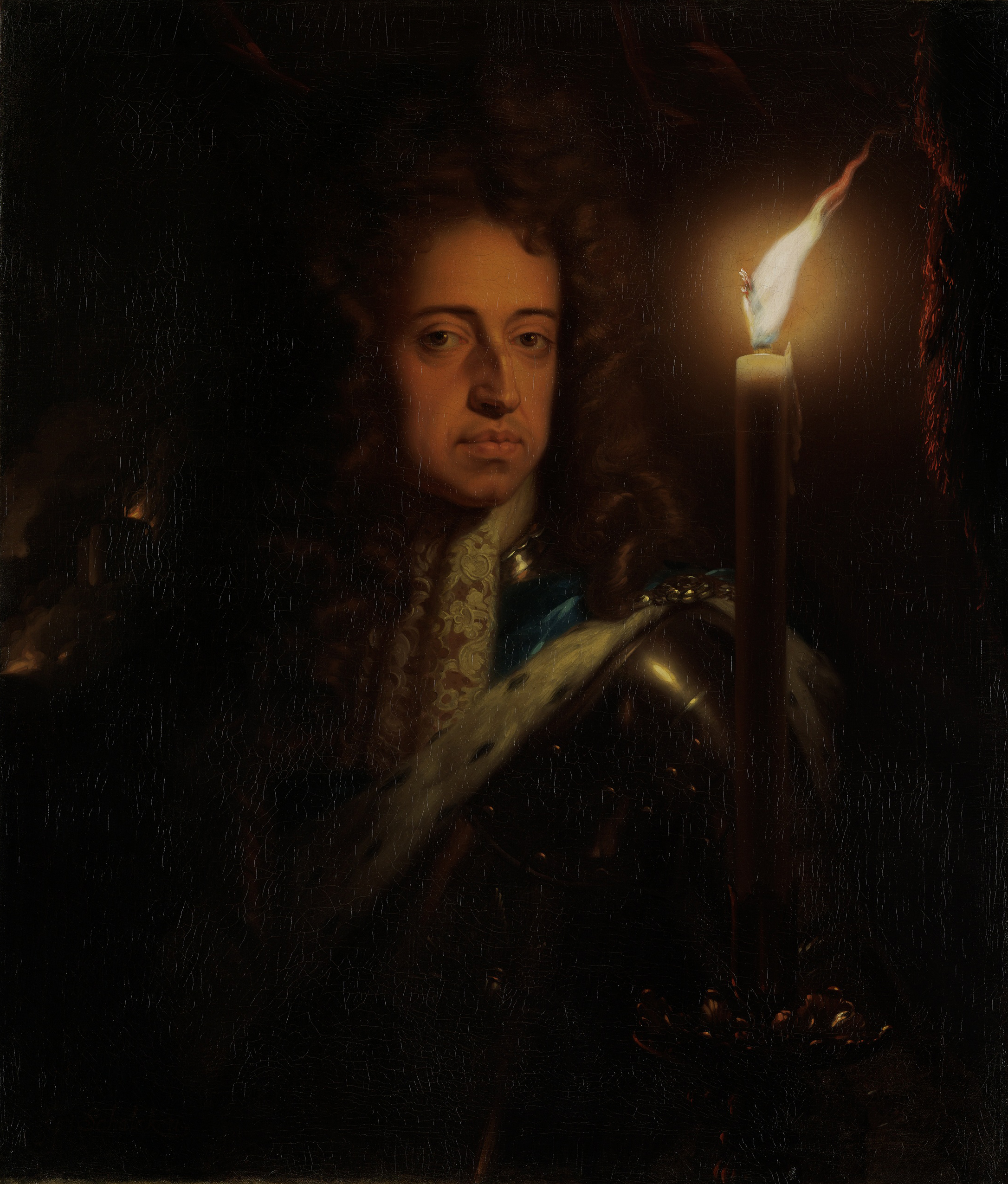
Portrait by Godfried Schalcken, 1690s

Mary II died of smallpox on 28 December 1694, aged 32, leaving William to rule alone. William deeply mourned his wife's death. Despite his conversion to Anglicanism, William's popularity in England plummeted during his reign as a sole monarch.

=== Rumours of homosexuality ===
During the 1690s, rumours grew of William's alleged homosexual inclinations and led to the publication of many satirical pamphlets by his Jacobite detractors He did have several close male associates, including two Dutch courtiers to whom he granted English titles: Hans Willem Bentinck became Earl of Portland, and Arnold Joost van Keppel was created Earl of Albemarle. These relationships with male friends, and his keeping of only one mistress, led William's enemies to suggest that he might prefer homosexual relationships. William's modern biographers disagree on the veracity of these allegations. Some believe there may have been truth to the rumours, while others affirm that they were no more than figments of his enemies' imaginations, as it was common for someone childless like William to adopt, or evince paternal affections for, a younger man.

Whatever the case, Bentinck's closeness to William did arouse jealousies at the royal court. William's young protégé, Keppel, aroused more gossip and suspicion, being 20 years William's junior, strikingly handsome, and having risen from the post of a royal page to an earldom with some ease. Portland wrote to William in 1697 that "the kindness which your Majesty has for a young man, and the way in which you seem to authorise his liberties ... make the world say things I am ashamed to hear." This, he said, was "tarnishing a reputation which has never before been subject to such accusations". William tersely dismissed these suggestions, however, saying, "It seems to me very extraordinary that it should be impossible to have esteem and regard for a young man without it being criminal."

=== Peace with France ===
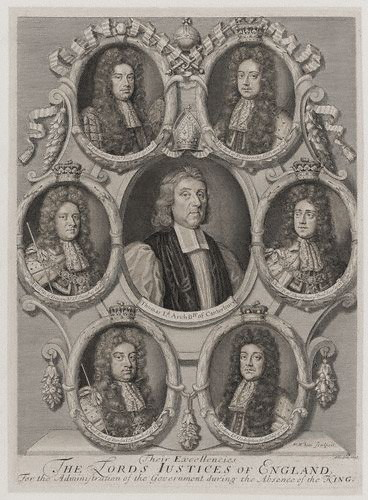
Engraving from 1695 showing the Lord Justices who administered the kingdom while William was on campaign

In 1696, the Dutch County of Drenthe made William its Stadtholder. In the same year, Jacobites plotted to assassinate William in an attempt to restore James to the English throne. The plan failed and support for William surged. Parliament passed a bill of attainder against the alleged ringleader, John Fenwick, and he was beheaded in 1697. In accordance with the Treaty of Rijswijk (20 September 1697), which ended the Nine Years' War, King Louis XIV recognised William as King of England, and undertook to give no further assistance to James II. Thus deprived of French dynastic backing after 1697, Jacobites posed no further serious threats during William's reign.

As his life drew towards its conclusion, William, like many other contemporary European rulers, felt concern over the question of succession to the throne of Spain, which brought with it vast territories in Italy, the Low Countries and the New World. Charles II of Spain was an invalid with no prospect of having children; some of his closest relatives included Louis XIV of France and Leopold I, Holy Roman Emperor. William sought to prevent the Spanish inheritance from going to either monarch, for he feared that such a calamity would upset the balance of power. William and Louis agreed to the First Partition Treaty (1698), which provided for the division of the Spanish Empire: Joseph Ferdinand, Electoral Prince of Bavaria, would obtain Spain, while France and the Holy Roman Emperor would divide the remaining territories between them. Charles II accepted the nomination of Joseph Ferdinand as his heir, and war appeared to be averted.

Louis XIV of France, William's lifelong enemy

When, however, Joseph Ferdinand died of smallpox in February 1699, the issue re-opened. In 1700, William and Louis agreed to the Second Partition Treaty (also called the Treaty of London), under which the territories in Italy would pass to a son of the King of France, and the other Spanish territories would be inherited by a son of the Holy Roman Emperor. This arrangement infuriated both the Spanish, who still sought to prevent the dissolution of their empire, and the Holy Roman Emperor, who regarded the Italian territories as much more useful than the other lands. Unexpectedly, Charles II of Spain interfered as he lay dying in late 1700. Unilaterally, he willed all Spanish territories to Philip, Duke of Anjou, a grandson of Louis XIV. The French conveniently ignored the Second Partition Treaty and claimed the entire Spanish inheritance. Furthermore, Louis alienated William by recognising James Francis Edward Stuart, the son of the former King James II (who died in September 1701), as de jure King of England. The subsequent conflict, known as the War of the Spanish Succession, broke out in July 1701 and continued until 1713/1714.

=== English royal succession ===
Another royal inheritance, apart from that of Spain, also concerned William. His marriage with Mary had not produced any children, and he did not seem likely to remarry. Mary's sister, Anne, had borne numerous children, all of whom died during childhood. The death of her last surviving child (Prince William, Duke of Gloucester) in 1700 left her as the only individual in the line of succession established by the Bill of Rights. As the complete exhaustion of the defined line of succession would have encouraged a restoration of James II's line, the English Parliament passed the Act of Settlement 1701, which provided that if Anne died without surviving issue and William failed to have surviving issue by any subsequent marriage, the Crown would pass to a distant relative, Sophia, Electress of Hanover (a granddaughter of James I), and to her Protestant heirs. The Act debarred Roman Catholics from the throne, thereby excluding the candidacy of several dozen people more closely related to Mary and Anne than Sophia. The Act extended to England and Ireland, but not to Scotland, whose Estates had not been consulted before the selection of Sophia.

== Death ==
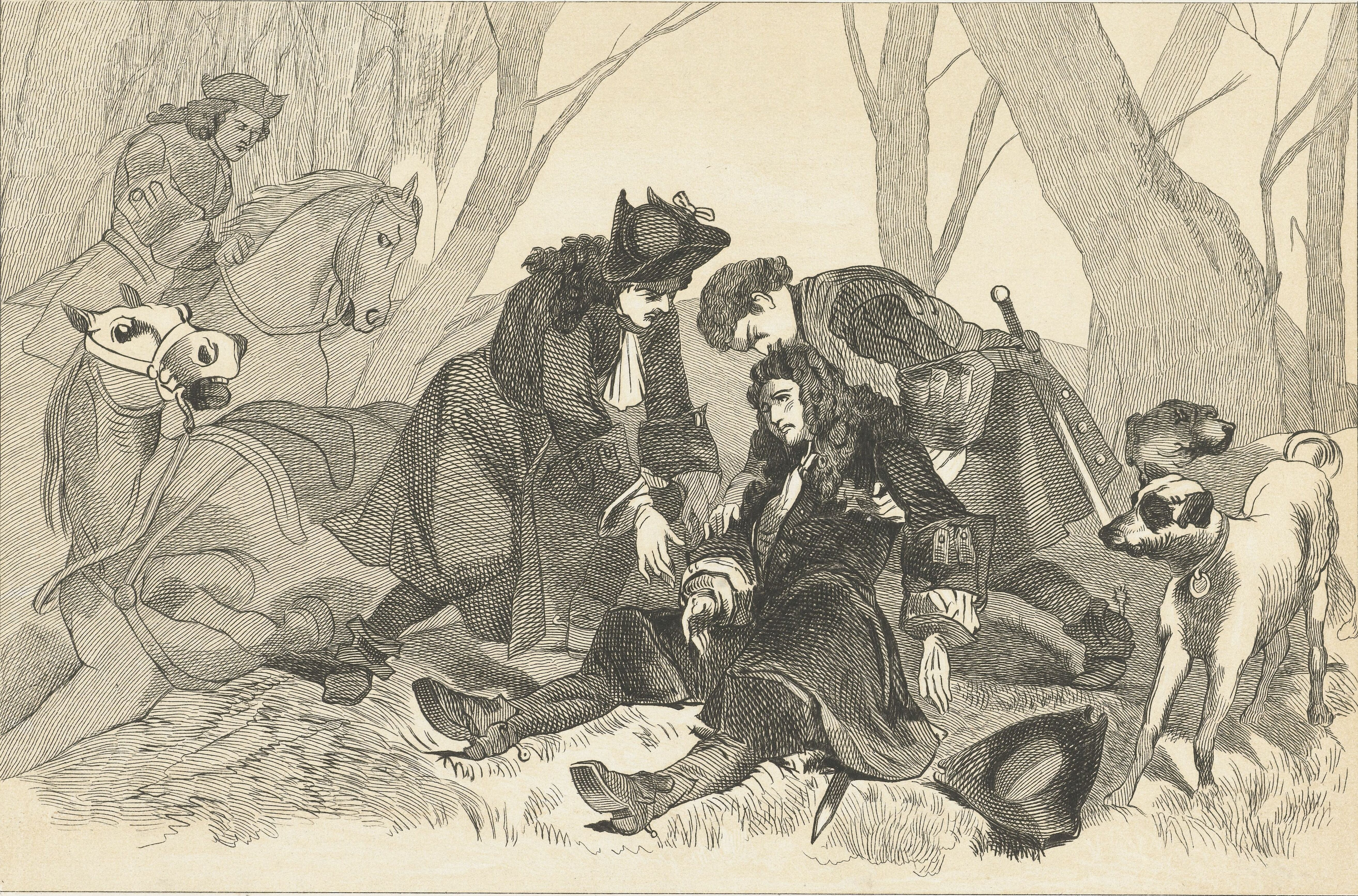
19th-century depiction of William's deadly fall from his horse

In 1702, William died aged 51 at Kensington Palace of pneumonia, a complication from a broken collarbone following a fall from his horse, Sorrel. It was rumoured that the horse had been confiscated from Sir John Fenwick, one of the Jacobites who had conspired against William. Because his horse had stumbled into a mole's burrow, many Jacobites toasted "the little gentleman in the black velvet waistcoat". Years later, Winston Churchill, in his A History of the English-Speaking Peoples, stated that the fall "opened the door to a troop of lurking foes". William was buried in Westminster Abbey alongside his wife. His sister-in-law and cousin, Anne, became queen regnant of England, Scotland and Ireland.

William's death meant that he would remain the only member of the Dutch House of Orange to reign over England. Members of this House had served as stadtholder of Holland and the majority of the other provinces of the Dutch Republic since the time of William the Silent (William I). The five provinces of which William III was stadtholder—Holland, Zeeland, Utrecht, Gelderland, and Overijssel—all suspended the office after his death. Thus, he was the last patrilineal descendant of William I to be named stadtholder for the majority of the provinces. Under William III's will, John William Friso stood to inherit the Principality of Orange as well as several lordships in the Netherlands. He was William's closest agnatic relative, as well as grandson of William's aunt Henriette Catherine. However, Frederick I of Prussia also claimed the principality as the senior cognatic heir, his mother Louise Henriette being Henriette Catherine's older sister. Under the Treaty of Utrecht (1713), Frederick I's successor, Frederick William I of Prussia, ceded his territorial claim to Louis XIV, keeping only a claim to the title. Friso's posthumous son, William IV, succeeded to the title at his birth in 1711; in the Treaty of Partition (1732), William IV agreed to share the title "Prince of Orange" with Frederick William.

== Legacy ==
He was a great man, an enemy of France, to which he did a great deal of harm, but we owe him our esteem.

— Napoleon Bonaparte

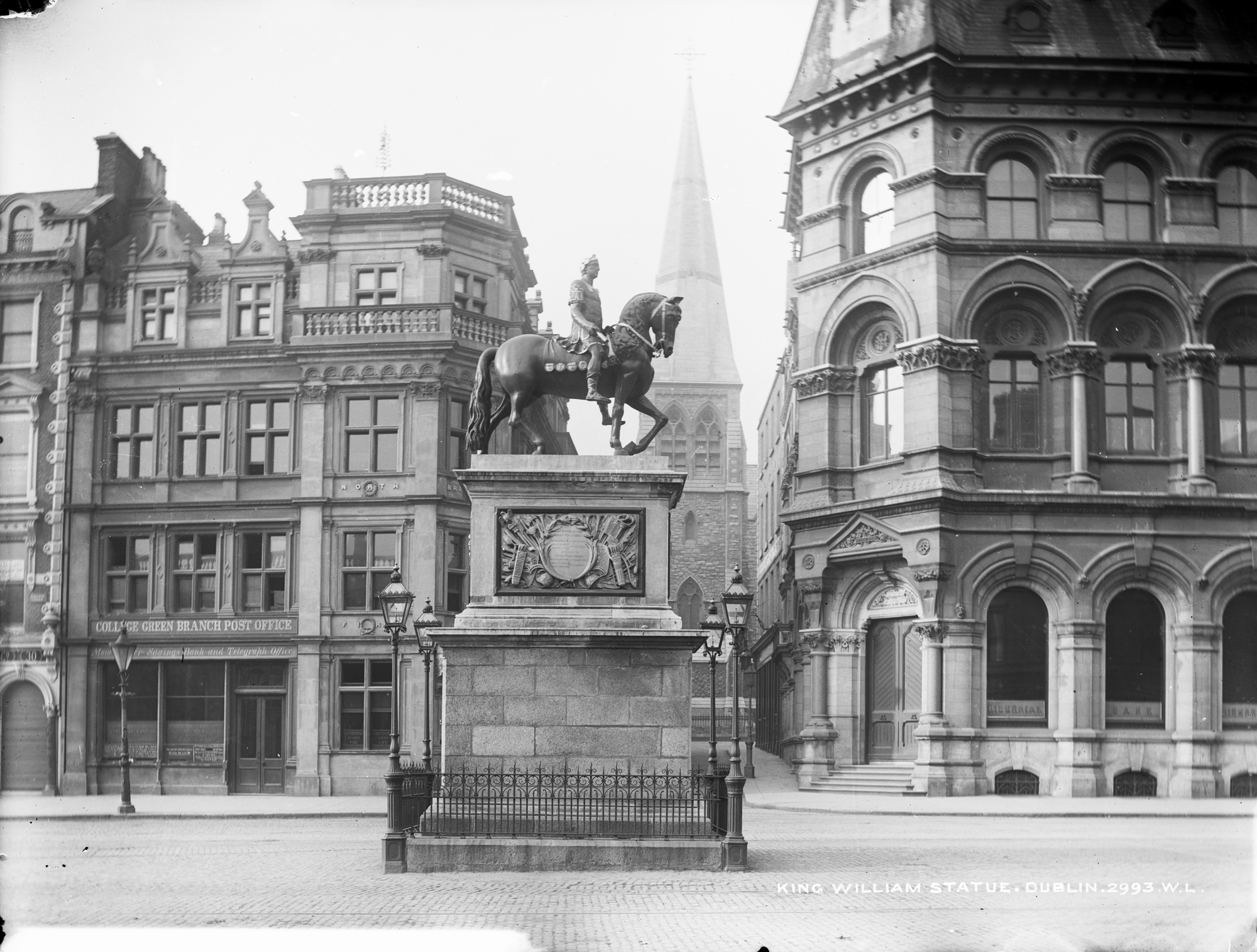
Statue of William III formerly located on College Green, Dublin. Erected in 1701, it was destroyed by the IRA in 1928.

William's primary achievement was to contain France when it was in a position to impose its will across much of Europe. His life's aim was largely to oppose Louis XIV of France. This effort continued after his death during the War of the Spanish Succession. Another important consequence of William's reign in England involved the ending of a bitter conflict between Crown and Parliament that had lasted since the accession of the first English monarch of the House of Stuart, James I, in 1603. The conflict over royal and parliamentary power had led to the English Civil War during the 1640s and the Glorious Revolution of 1688. During William's reign, however, the conflict was settled in Parliament's favour by the Bill of Rights 1689, the Triennial Act 1694 and the Act of Settlement 1701.

=== William as an army commander ===
The historical verdict on William's qualities as an army commander is mixed. Many contemporaries agreed that he was a great field commander. Even his enemies spoke highly of him. The French Marquis de Quincy, for example, wrote that it was due to William's insight and personal courage that the Allies held out at the Battle of Seneffe, while he also praises how William led his troops to safety during the battles of Steenkerque and Landen. The 19th-century Dutch historian Willem Jan Knoop, who wrote extensively about William's military career, argued that William was an exceptional strategist and considered William's military thinking unusually advanced for the 17th century, noting that his indirect approach to liberating Dutch territory in 1673, by cutting off French lines of communication, prefigured Napoleonic operational strategy.

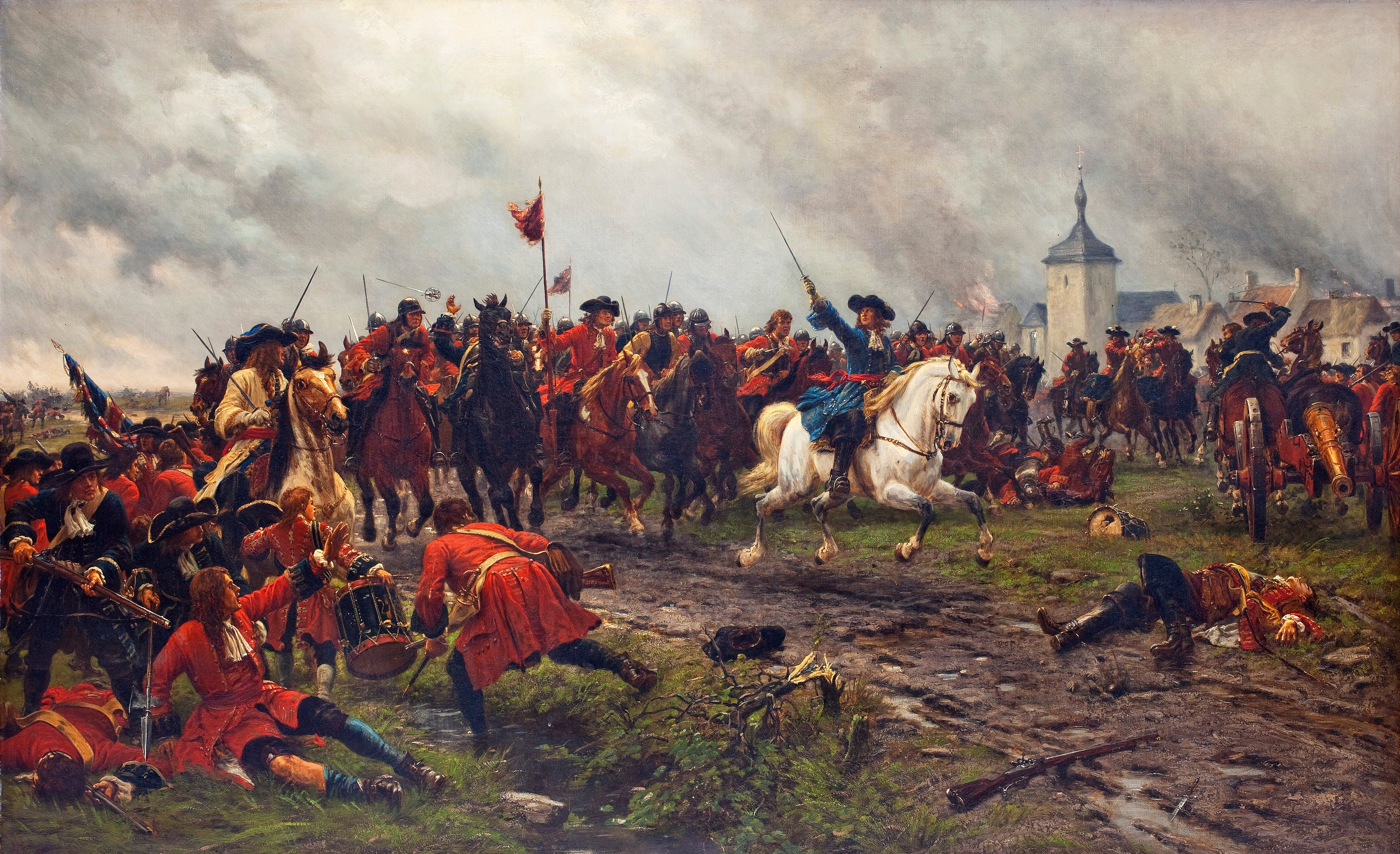
Victorian reimagining of William III at the Battle of Landen, by Ernest Crofts

Still, William has been blamed by French and British historians for his impatience and recklessness, and for treating lightly his life and the lives of his soldiers. British historian John Childs acknowledges William's great qualities, but feels that he fell short as a field commander because, by often throwing himself into the fray, he no longer had the complete oversight.

While William's campaigns were often tarnished by setbacks Dutch historian Olaf van Nimwegen argues it would be wrong to place the responsibility solely on him. William was often outnumbered and up against a strong uniformly organised army with a coalition army. Many of the coalition troops were not as practised and disciplined as the Dutch troops, and it took time to incorporate them into the Dutch system. William did not attach much value to traditional victory signs either. Aware of his disadvantages, William often focused on limiting enemy gains and considered himself a winner if he managed to inflate French losses to the point where French offensive plans had to be abandoned. The battles he fought were almost all ones of attrition. That the Allies also suffered many casualties he took for granted. The Dutch army organisation was prepared for that; and, from 1689, so was England's.

William was not only an active field commander but also a military reformer. After the crisis of 1672, William III initiated major reforms that transformed the Dutch States Army into a professional standing force. He ended the system where officers bore the financial risk of war, allowing losses to be quickly replenished, and introduced a modern supply system by outsourcing logistics to private contractors. These changes enabled the Dutch to field larger armies and sustain longer campaigns. By the time of the War of the Spanish Succession, just after William's death in 1702, the Dutch army was widely admired and among the best in Europe. The infantry, in particular, was highly regarded and known for its discipline, superior training, and its development of platoon fire.

William III of Orange instilled this discipline by being extremely strict with his officers and soldiers. If, in his view, they showed cowardice, they were severely punished. Officers who refused to obey their superiors could be reduced to the ranks as common soldiers, and if this occurred in battle it could even carry the death penalty. Major Eerich Dieurklouw was executed for refusing to advance with his battalion at the Battle of Seneffe. When, at the Battle of Cassel, a battalion of marines fled instead of holding their ground, William III ordered that one soldier from each company be executed by lot. Soldiers found guilty of looting were also hanged without mercy along the roadside. While not widely loved by his men, he was respected. What he demanded of his troops, he demanded of himself. He was often personally present in the thickest of the fighting and shared in the same dangers as his soldiers.

=== Other ===
In Ulster, he is referred to colloquially as King Billy, and is the central figure of the Orange Order and the Ulster Unionist community. His Battle of the Boyne victory in 1690 against Catholic King James, which secured the Protestant ascendancy and the Glorious Revolution, is commemorated annually in the Twelfth of July parade.

William endowed the College of William and Mary in Virginia in 1693. Nassau County, New York, a county on Long Island, is a namesake. Long Island itself was also known as Nassau during early Dutch rule. Though many alumni of Princeton University think that the town of Princeton, New Jersey (and hence the university), were named in his honour, this is probably untrue, although Nassau Hall, the college's first building, is named for him. New York City was briefly renamed New Orange for him in 1673 after the Dutch recaptured the city, which had been renamed New York by the English in 1665. His name was applied to the fort and administrative centre for the city on two separate occasions reflecting his different sovereign status—first as Fort Willem Hendrick in 1673, and then as Fort William in 1691 when the English evicted colonists who had seized the fort and city. Nassau, the capital of The Bahamas, is named after Fort Nassau, which was renamed in 1695 in his honour. The Dutch East India Company built a military fort in Cape Town, South Africa, in the 17th century, naming it the Castle of Good Hope. The five bastions were named after William III's titles: Orange, Nassau, Catzenellenbogen, Buuren and Leerdam.

== Titles, styles, and arms ==
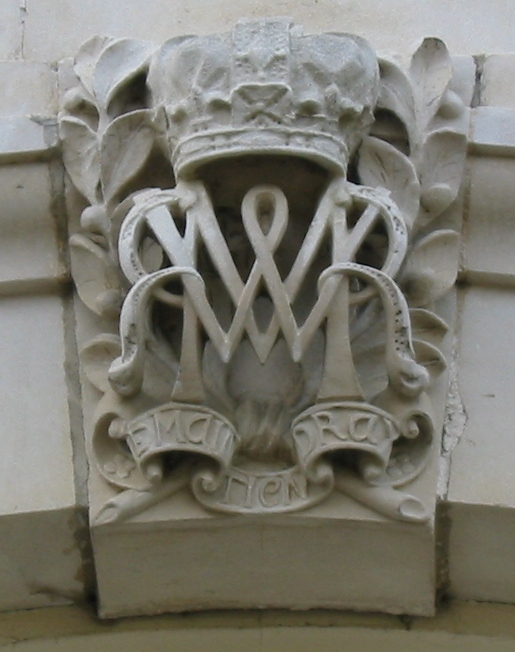
Joint monogram of William and Mary carved onto Hampton Court Palace

=== Titles and styles ===
- 4 November 1650 – 9 July 1672: His Highness The Prince of Orange, Count of Nassau
- 9–16 July 1672: His Highness The Prince of Orange, Stadtholder of Holland
- 16 July 1672 – 26 April 1674: His Highness The Prince of Orange, Stadtholder of Holland and Zeeland
- 26 April 1674 – 13 February 1689: His Highness The Prince of Orange, Stadtholder of Holland, Zeeland, Utrecht, Gelderland and Overijssel
- 13 February 1689 – 8 March 1702: His Majesty The King

By 1674, William was fully styled as "Willem III, by God's grace Prince of Orange, Count of Nassau etc., Stadtholder of Holland, Zeeland, Utrecht etc., Captain- and Admiral-General of the United Netherlands". After their accession in Great Britain in 1689, William and Mary used the titles "King and Queen of England, Scotland, France and Ireland, Defenders of the Faith, etc."

=== Arms ===
As Prince of Orange, William's coat of arms was: Quarterly, I Azure billetty a lion rampant Or (for Nassau); II Or a lion rampant guardant Gules crowned Azure (Katzenelnbogen); III Gules a fess Argent (Vianden), IV Gules two lions passant guardant Or, armed and langued azure (Dietz); between the I and II quarters an inescutcheon, Or a fess Sable (Moers); at the fess point an inescutcheon, quarterly I and IV Gules, a bend Or (Châlons); II and III Or a bugle horn Azure, stringed Gules Orange) with an inescutcheon, Nine pieces Or and Azure (Geneva); between the III and IV quarters, an inescutcheon, Gules a fess counter embattled Argent (Buren).

The coat of arms used by the king and queen was: Quarterly, I and IV Grand quarterly, Azure three fleurs-de-lis Or (for France) and Gules three lions passant guardant in pale Or (for England); II Or a lion rampant within a double tressure flory-counter-flory Gules (for Scotland); III Azure a harp Or stringed Argent (for Ireland); over all an escutcheon Azure billetty a lion rampant Or.

Coats of arms of William III

Arms used by William III as Prince of Orange

Coat of arms as monarch outside Scotland

Coat of arms as monarch in Scotland

== Ancestry ==
Ancestors of William III of England

8. William the Silent
4. Frederick Henry, Prince of Orange
9. Louise de Coligny
2. William II, Prince of Orange
10. John Albert I, Count of Solms-Braunfels
5. Amalia of Solms-Braunfels
11. Countess Agnes of Sayn-Wittgenstein
1. William III of England
12. James VI and I
6. Charles I of England
13. Anne of Denmark
3. Mary, Princess Royal
14. Henry IV of France
7. Henrietta Maria of France
15. Marie de' Medici

=== Orange and Stuart: Family tree ===
Family of William III of England

William the Silent, Prince of Orange	Henry IV of France	James I of England
Amalia of Solms-Braunfels	Frederick Henry, Prince of Orange	Henrietta Maria	Charles I of England	Elizabeth Stuart
Louise Henriette of Nassau	Albertine Agnes of Nassau	William II, Prince of Orange	Mary, Princess Royal	Charles II of England	James II of England	Sophia of Hanover
Frederick I of Prussia	Henry Casimir II, Prince of Nassau-Dietz	William III of England	Mary II of England	Anne of England	James Francis Edward	George I of Great Britain
John William Friso, Prince of Orange

== See also ==
- British monarchs' family tree
- Constantijn Huygens Jr. – secretary to William III
- Abel Tassin d'Alonne – illegitimate elder half-brother of William III and his secretary after the death of Huygens

== Notes ==
William III of England and Orange & II of Scotland House of Orange-Nassau Cadet branch of the House of Nassau Born: 4 November 1650 Died: 8 March 1702
Regnal titles
Vacant Title last held by William II	Prince of Orange; 1650–1702	Succeeded by John William Friso as titular claimant
Vacant Glorious Revolution Title last held by James II & VII	King of England, Scotland, and Ireland; 1689–1702 with Mary II (1689–1694)	Succeeded by Anne
Political offices
Vacant First Stadtholderless Period Title last held by William II	Stadtholder of Holland and Zeeland; 1672–1702	Vacant Second Stadtholderless Period Title next held by William IV
Vacant First Stadtholderless Period Title last held by William II	Stadtholder of Utrecht; 1674–1702	Vacant Second Stadtholderless Period Title next held by William IV
Vacant First Stadtholderless Period Title last held by William II	Stadtholder of Guelders and Overijssel; 1675–1702	Vacant Second Stadtholderless Period Title next held by William IV
Preceded by James II	Lord High Admiral; 1689	Succeeded by The Earl of Torrington
