= Siege of Charleroi (1672) =

1672 siege of Charleroi

- Part of the Franco-Dutch War
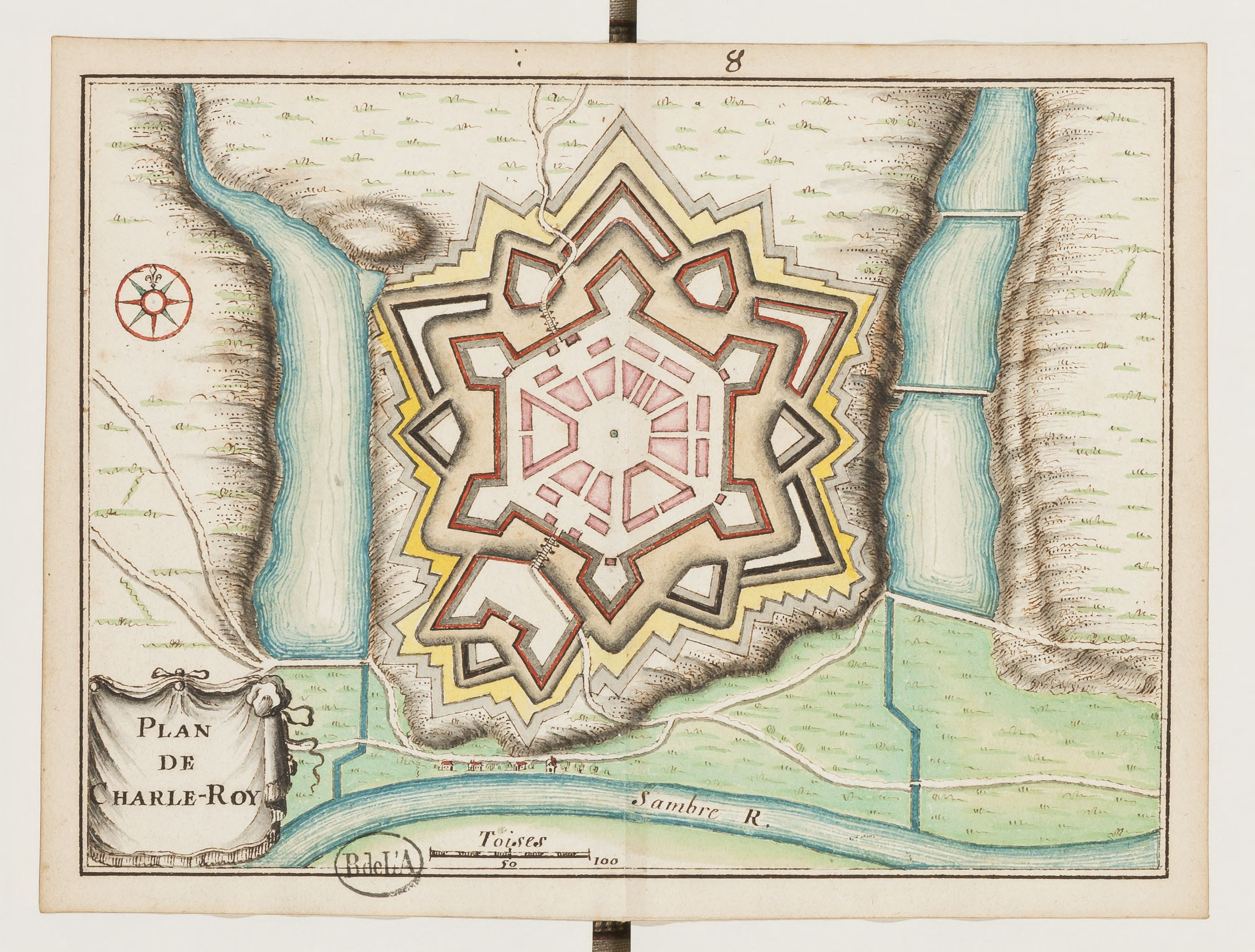
- 17th century depiction of Charleroi
Date	14–26 December, 1672
Location	Charleroi, Belgium
Result	French victory

Belligerents
Dutch Republic	Kingdom of France

Commanders and leaders
(Dutch Republic) William III of Orange	Unknown

The siege of Charleroi was a military operation launched by William III of Orange against the city of Charleroi which was under French control. The siege failed and William was forced to retreat.

== Background ==
Charleroi was one of the cities annexed by France from the Spanish Netherlands after the war of Devolution. During the preparation of the French invasion of the Dutch Republic in 1672, Charleroi served as a supply point for the French army. It therefore functioned as a starting base for the French forces.

== Siege ==
After the battle of Woerden, William gained permission from the Dutch field marshals to commence the siege of Charleroi. William also gained the permission from the governor of the Spanish Netherlands, the Count of Monterey to besiege Charleroi, even though that was a risky move since it could potentially drag Spain into war with France.

William encountered difficulties besieging the city due to the frozen ground. His chance to take Charleroi also depended on his allies: Monterey was not in a position to provide troops, and Raimondo Montecuccoli was awaiting battle in the Holy Roman Empire. William also learned that the Water Line was threatened as Luxembourg was preparing an offensive against Holland. Because of this, William was forced to abandon the siege and return to the Republic.

== Aftermath ==
After the siege, Luxembourg attacked and slaughtered the villages of Bodegraven and Zwammerdam through Woerden. He had also planned to invade Den Haag, but the attempt failed due to heavy rain. Although William's siege failed, it demonstrated that the Dutch army felt strong and confident enough to take major initiatives on their own. In France, Louis XIV was compelled to improve the defenses of Charleroi to prevent future attacks.
