= Battle of Seneffe =

1674 battle during the Franco-Dutch War

- Part of the Franco-Dutch War
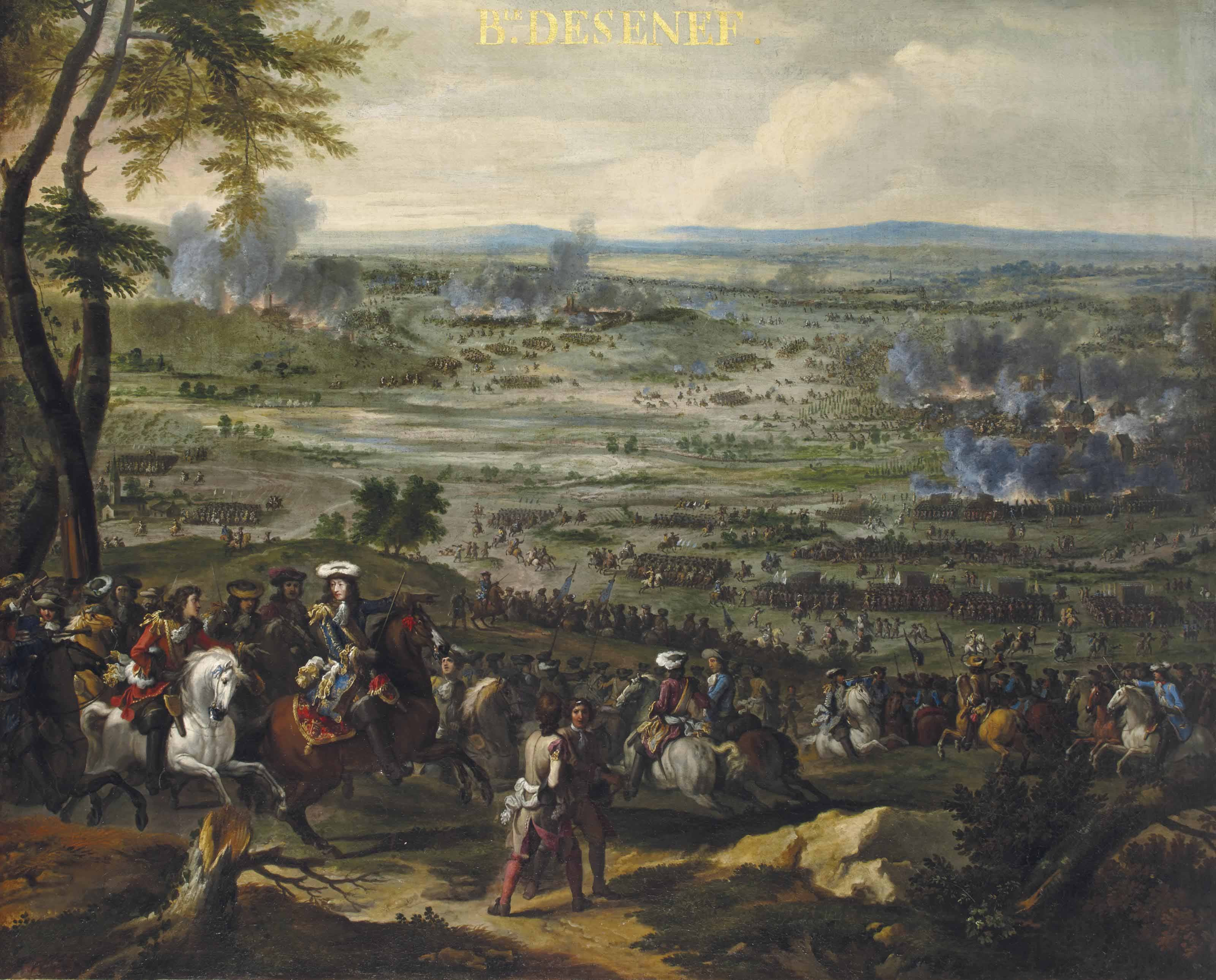
- Battle of Seneffe, 11 August 1674
| Date | 11 August 1674 |
| Location | near Seneffe, Hainaut, present-day Belgium |
| Result | See Aftermath |

Belligerents
| France | Dutch Republic; Holy Roman Empire; Spain |

Commanders and leaders
| (Kingdom of France) Grand Condé (Kingdom of France) Luxembourg (Kingdom of France) Duc de Navailles (Kingdom of France) Duc d'Enghien | (Dutch Republic) William of Orange (Dutch Republic) Nassau-Siegen (Dutch Republic) Aylva (Holy Roman Empire) de Souches (Holy Roman Empire) Prince Vaudémont (Spain) Monterrey |

Strength
| 45,000–50,000 men 60 guns | 60,000–65,000 men (Note: These included a Spanish contingent of 4,000 infantry and 1,000 cavalry); 70 guns |

Casualties and losses
| c. 10,000 | c. 15,000 |

The Battle of Seneffe, 11 August 1674, took place during the Franco-Dutch War, near Seneffe in Belgium, then part of the Spanish Netherlands. A French army commanded by Condé confronted a combined Dutch, Imperial, and Spanish force under William of Orange. One of the bloodiest battles of the war, over 20% of those engaged on both sides became casualties, and the result is disputed.

By 1674, Allied forces in the Spanish Netherlands were numerically superior to the French army under Condé, which was based along the Piéton river near Charleroi. William took the offensive and sought to bring on a battle by outflanking the French positions, but the broken ground forced him to divide his army into three separate columns.

Condé launched a cavalry attack on the Allied vanguard, and by midday on 11 August had halted their advance. Against the advice of his subordinates, he then ordered a series of frontal assaults which led to heavy casualties on both sides with no concrete result. Fighting continued until nightfall, when the French withdrew to their original positions, and William retired the next day in good order.

Despite heavier casualties, the Allies retained their numerical advantage, and for the rest of the campaign Condé largely remained on the defensive. Of the two other battles in Flanders before the war ended in 1678, Cassel was sparked by an Allied attempt to relieve Saint-Omer, and Saint-Denis to prevent the French capture of Mons.

== Background ==
Since both Louis XIV of France and the Dutch Republic viewed control of the Spanish Netherlands as essential for security and trade, it was a contested area for much of the later 17th century. In the 1667-68 War of Devolution with Spain, France occupied much of the region before the Dutch-led Triple Alliance forced them to withdraw in the Treaty of Aix-la-Chapelle (1668). After this, Louis decided the best way to achieve his territorial ambitions was to first defeat the Dutch.

When the Franco-Dutch War began in May 1672, French troops quickly overran large parts of the Netherlands, but by July the Dutch position had stabilised. The unexpected success of his offensive had encouraged Louis to make excessive demands, while concern at French gains brought the Dutch support from Brandenburg-Prussia, Emperor Leopold, and Charles II of Spain. In August 1673, an Imperial army opened a new front in the Rhineland, and Louis responded by withdrawing from the Netherlands, retaining only Grave and Maastricht. In January 1674, Denmark–Norway joined the anti-French coalition, while in February the Treaty of Westminster ended the Third Anglo-Dutch War, depriving Louis of a key ally against the Dutch.

The Seneffe campaign, 1674; key locations in the Low Countries (dark green=modern Belgium)

In May, the main French army under Louis himself attacked the largely undefended Spanish territory of Franche-Comté. Condé remained on the defensive in the Spanish Netherlands, while a Dutch-Spanish army led by William of Orange and Count Monterrey spent June and July attempting to bring him to battle. When this proved unsuccessful, William proposed invading French Flanders, which would threaten Condé's rear and force him to fight. Monterrey agreed, since it gave the Spanish an opportunity to recapture the key border town of Charleroi.

On 23 July, William was joined near Nivelles by Imperial troops under de Souches, giving him a total of about 65,000. Having occupied Franche-Comté, Louis sent Condé substantial reinforcements, and by early August he had 45,000 men entrenched along the Piéton river, which joined the Sambre at Charleroi. Concluding these positions were too strong to attack, on 9 August the Allies moved into new lines facing the French left, running from Arquennes to Roux. By doing so, they hoped to tempt Condé into an attack, but when he simply shifted his troops to face the threat, the Allied leaders decided to bypass Seneffe, and advance straight into the French rear.

== Battle ==
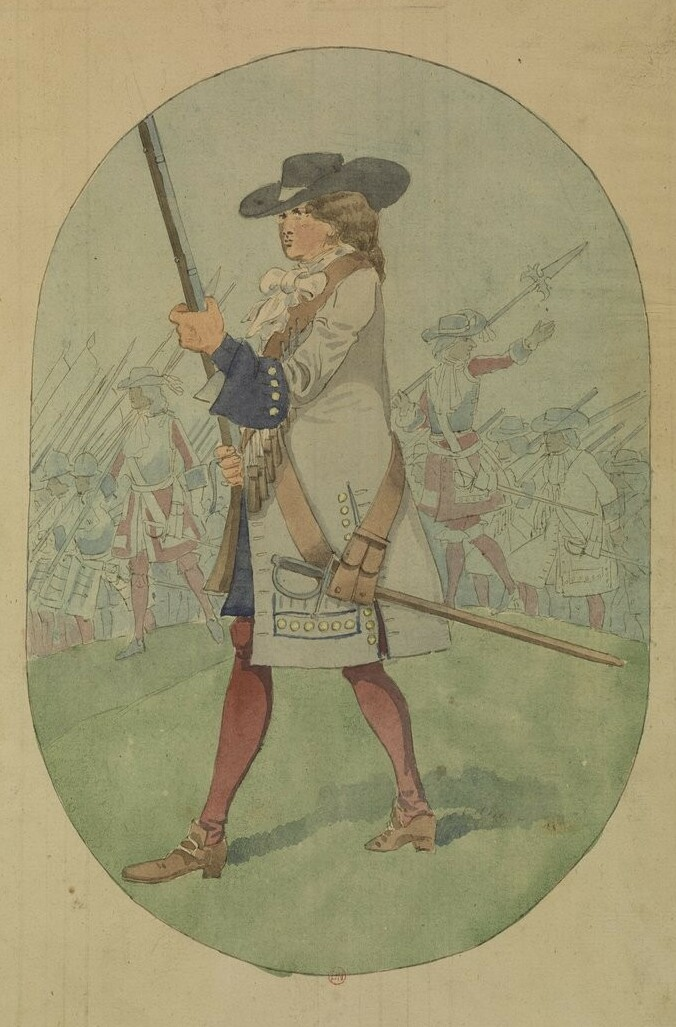
Dutch musketeer from the Schwartzenberg regiment

At 4:00 am on 11 August, the Allies set out in three columns, each marching parallel to the French positions, a formation dictated by the poor roads. The left column was commanded by de Souches, the right by the Marqués de Assentar, commander of the Spanish Army of Flanders, with the bulk of the infantry and artillery in the centre under William. A vanguard of 2,000 cavalry covered the gaps between the columns, with another 5,200 bringing up the rear led by Vaudémont.

At 5:30 am, Condé rode out to observe the Allied movement, and quickly perceived their intention. The terrain they were crossing was marshy and broken up by numerous hedges, walls and woods, with limited exit points; gambling these factors would negate their superior numbers, Condé decided to attack. He sent 400 light cavalry under Saint Clar to skirmish with the Allied rearguard and slow down their march, while also despatching a cavalry brigade under the Marquis de Rannes to seize the high ground north of Seneffe.

Around 10:00 am, de Rannes came into contact with Vaudémont, who asked for infantry support and was sent three battalions under William Maurice. These were placed near the bridge over the Zenne river that flowed through Seneffe, with his cavalry just behind. Despite gout so severe he was unable to wear riding boots, Condé himself led the elite Maison du Roi cavalry across the Zenne above Seneffe, and scattered Vaudémont's cavalry, whose headlong flight temporarily disrupted the Spanish troops immediately behind them.

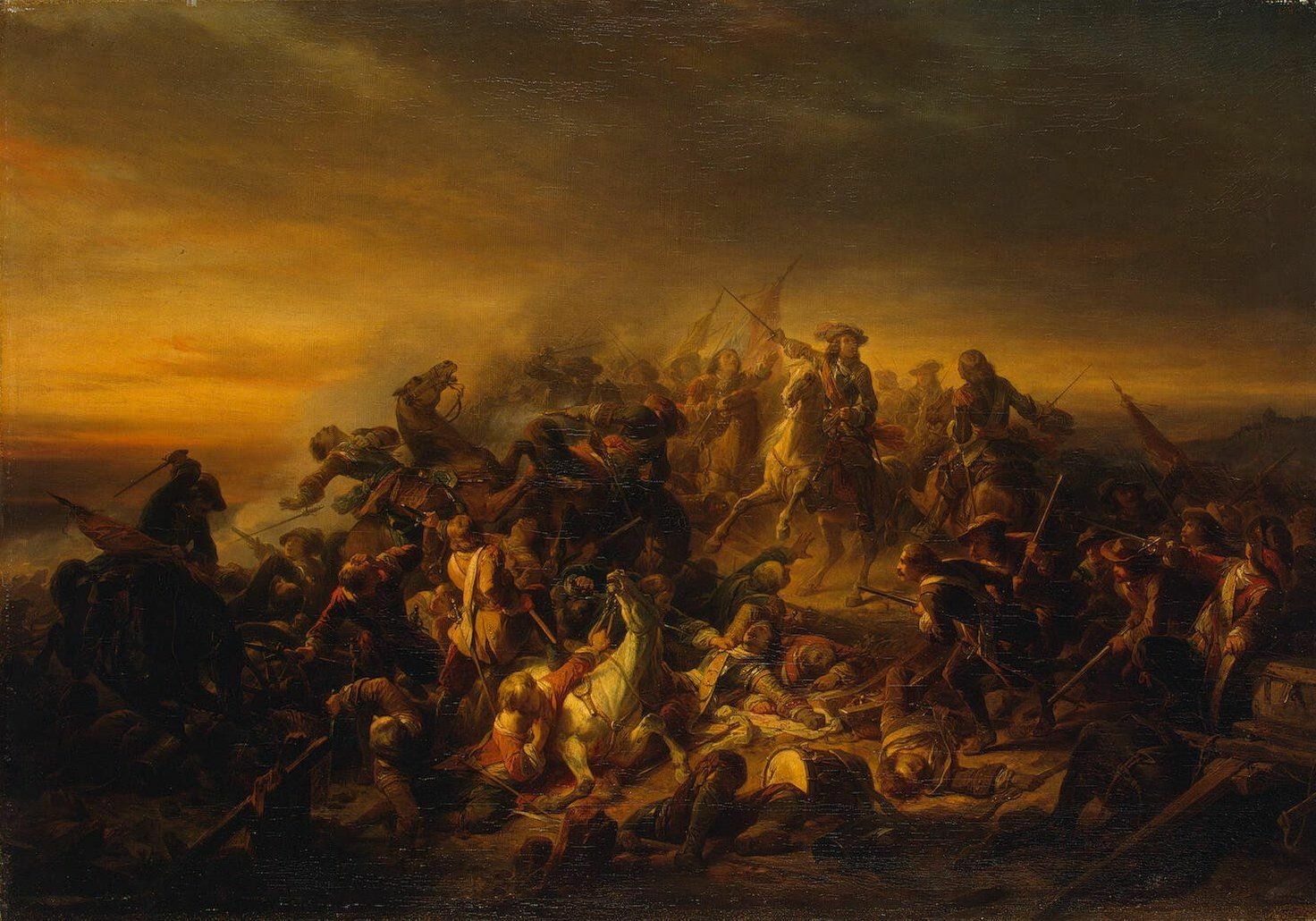
William of Orange at Seneffe.

Simultaneous assaults by de Rannes and the duc de Luxembourg eventually overwhelmed the Allied infantry in Seneffe, who were either killed or taken prisoner. By midday, Condé had inflicted significant losses and gained a clear, if minor, victory. However, he then persisted with a series of frontal assaults against the advice of his subordinates, and the battle degenerated into a number of confused and costly firefights.

William halted his march and established a defensive line, mainly composed of Dutch infantry, centred on the nearby Priory of St Nicolas. Just to the north, Assentar rallied the cavalry who had fled from Seneffe, and brought them back into the battle. They were driven back twice, but several French assaults on the priory were repulsed with heavy losses. When Assentar was mortally wounded in a third charge, the cavalry retreated in confusion, riding over their own infantry, and allowing the French to capture the priory. This last attempt was led by Condé, who was unhorsed and had to be rescued by his son. After taking St Nicolas, Luxembourg's troops then captured much of the Allied baggage train.

However, this provided time for William and his subordinates, John Maurice and Aylva, to complete a new defensive line at Fayt. The line was held by 23 Dutch battalions, and around 12:00 pm de Souches deployed his Imperial troops on their left. Condé assumed the Allies were retreating towards Mons, and planned to roll up them up from behind. William however turned Fayt into a strong defensive position, placing cannons along the access roads and hedges. The French were further hampered by the fact that the ground in front was unsuitable for cavalry, while their heavy guns had been left behind during the advance.

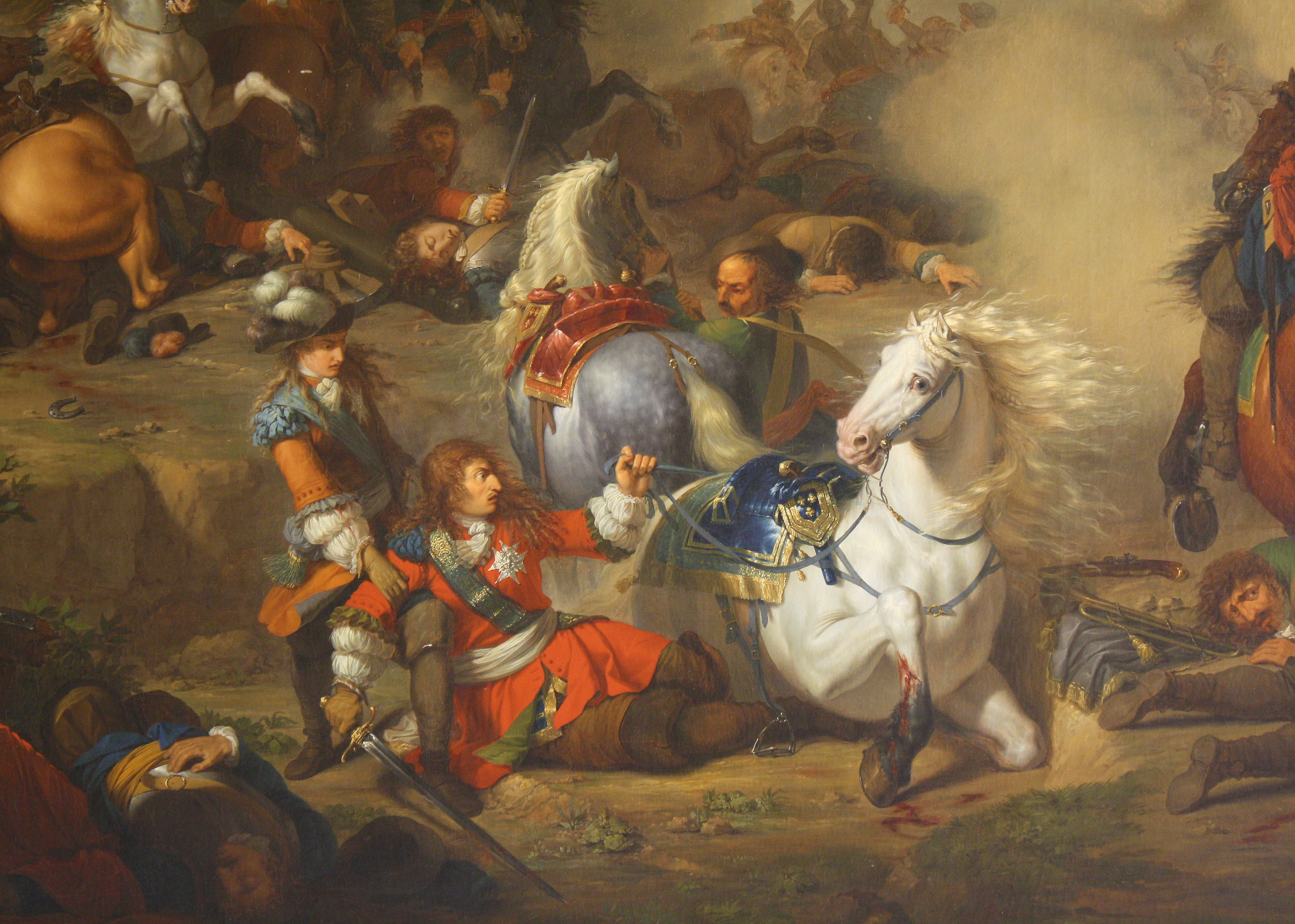
The duc d'Enghien rescues his father Condé at Seneffe

Condé ordered Luxembourg and Navailles to attack the Allied flanks, while he himself stormed the village with the French and Swiss Guards. The assaults continued throughout the afternoon, and each time were repulsed with heavy loss. (Note: At one point some French troops penetrated the village and managed to capture six Dutch guns, which were quickly retaken by an Allied counterattack. Imperial Lieutenant-General Chavagnac now aimed these pieces at the Maison du Roi at very close range. Chavagnac later wrote full of admiration about the French elite troops: 'I never heard anything else than: but: it's nothing, children, plug in; - and in an instant, the rank which had been cut down by the cannon was replenished. I shouted out to them that it was something after all; - one answered me that he would take revenge by tonight; - and I answered them that they should take this [cannon fire] while waiting in anticipation. Judge for yourself whether we were close!”) On the French right, Luxembourg's attack was delayed as his troops were busy looting the baggage train, and it took him some time to restore order. Reinforced with troops detached from the centre, he almost broke through, but was eventually thrown back. At about 17:00, Condé realised Luxembourg's men were exhausted, and ordered them to assume defensive positions.

On the French left, repeated attacks by Navailles on the Dutch positions were also repulsed. Although some troops finally managed to penetrate their lines around 19:00, William and Nassau-Siegen quickly moved the cavalry up, and restored the position after some hard fighting. Two hours later, Condé finally suspended all operations, although isolated firefights continued.

Many soldiers slept on the battlefield, and both armies held their positions, expecting to renew the battle next morning, but an intense burst of firing broke out around midnight, with men killed on both sides. Panic broke out in the French ranks and once calm was restored, Condé ordered his troops to fall back on Charleroi. William wanted to pursue them, but his colleagues would not agree, notably de Souches, the Imperial commander. (Note: William also claimed de Souches ignored his requests for support, which meant Imperial troops escaped relatively untouched from the battle. The Spanish Netherlands was not a strategic priority for Emperor Leopold, and de Souches was under orders to minimise Imperial losses in that theatre) Instead, William ordered his troops to fire a triple salvo to claim victory, then withdrew to Mons.

== Aftermath ==
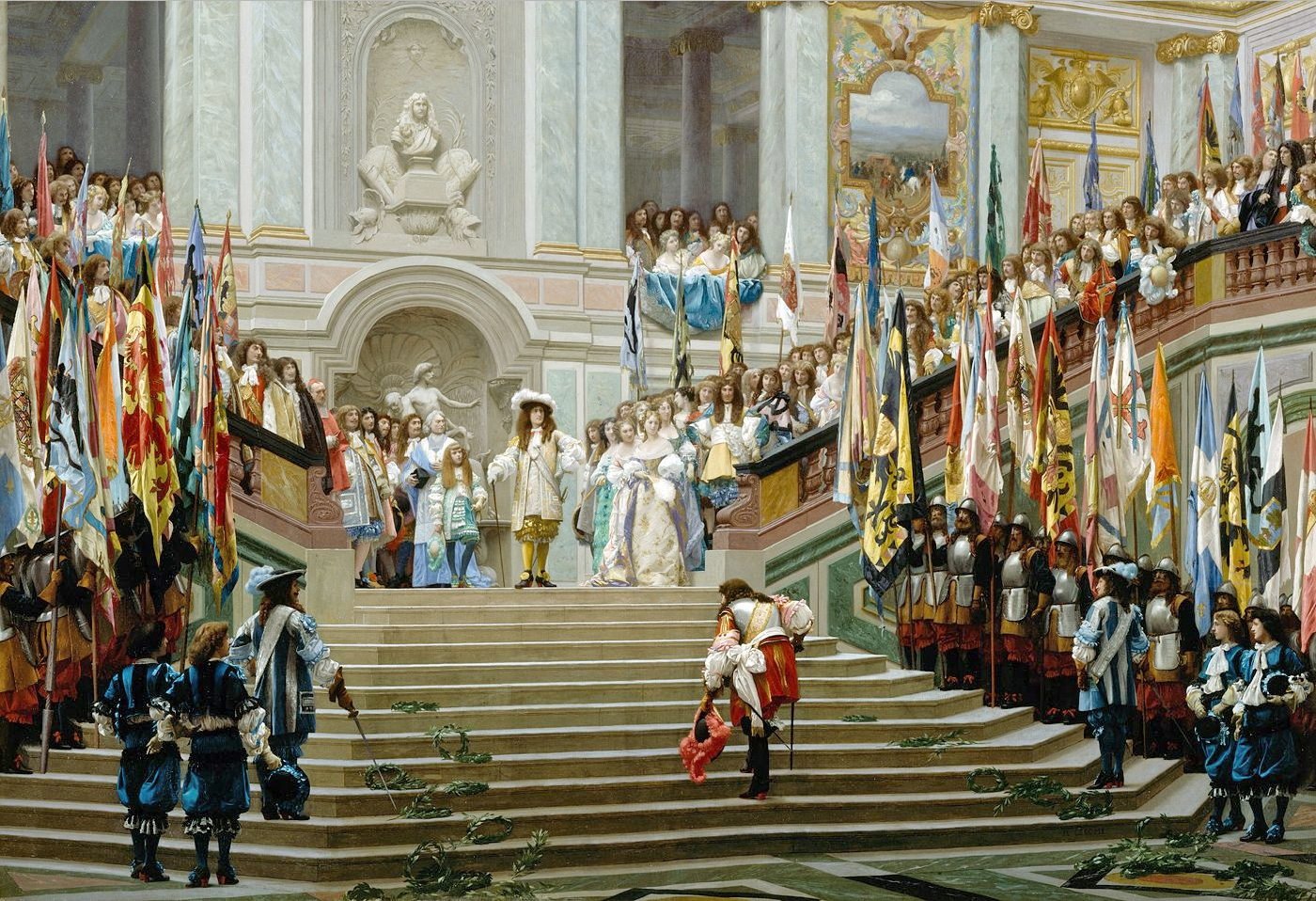
Condé's formal reception by Louis XIV at Versailles following Seneffe

As with many battles of the period, both sides claimed victory but in reality neither gained a clear advantage. The Allies were fortunate Condé failed to take advantage of his initial success, while his poorly judged frontal attacks rescued William from a serious defeat. The result is generally seen as either a narrow French victory, or inconclusive.

Casualties on both sides were enormous, with estimates of Allied losses ranging from 10,000 to 15,000, including prisoners. (Note: In 1970, American military historian Trevor N. Dupuy provided figures that agreed with other estimates of French losses, but for reasons that have not been explained doubled those for the Allies, which are then quoted by Spencer C. Tucker. Since Dupuy is the only analyst to suggest casualties on this level, Micheal Clodfelter argues the figure of 14,000 Allied casualties is 'more likely'.) The dead included Sir Walter Vane, deputy commander of the elite Scots Brigade, François Palm, Colonel of the Dutch Marines, and Assentar, whose body was later returned by Condé for burial. French casualties were between 7,000 to 10,000 dead or wounded, with particularly heavy losses among the officer corps. These shocked the French court, one contemporary writing "We have lost so much by this victory that without the Te Deum and captured flags at Notre Dame, we would believe we had lost the battle". French military engineer and strategist Sébastien Le Prestre de Vauban argued Seneffe showed siege warfare was a better way to achieve victory than costly battles, and Louis ordered Condé to avoid a repeat.

Although Allied casualties were higher than those of the French, they were quickly replaced by troops from nearby garrisons. In addition, a large convoy arrived outside Mons on 31 August, bringing supplies, a month's pay in advance for the survivors and five new Dutch regiments. With Condé unable to replace his losses to the same extent, the Allied numerical advantage was greater than before Seneffe, and William proposed another invasion attempt.

However, one less appreciated advantage held by the French over their opponents in this period was the benefit of an undivided command and unified strategy. For different reasons, neither Monterrey or de Souches were willing to risk another battle, and William was forced to compromise by besieging Oudenarde. Operations commenced on 16 September, and Condé began marching to its relief three days later. The Dutch and Spanish redoubled efforts to breach the walls before his arrival, but without advising his colleagues, de Souches sent the Imperial artillery off to Ghent. On 20 September, Condé took up position on the left bank of the Scheldt river and began bombarding the Allied positions on 21st. Since the Imperial troops would not fight without their guns, and the Dutch and Spanish could not face the French on their own, the Allies were forced to abandon the siege along with most of their remaining equipment.

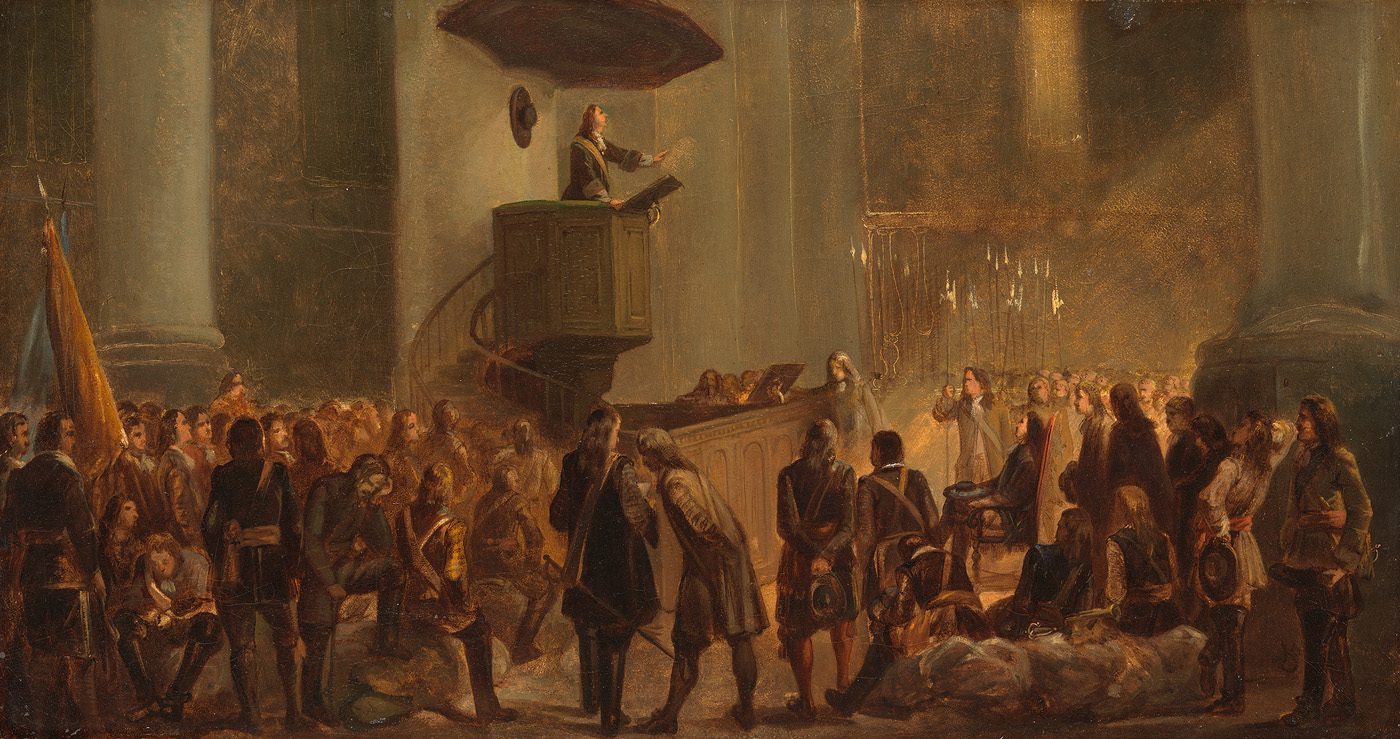
The thanksgiving service of William III's army in Grave after its capture

After strong protests from the Dutch States General, de Souches was relieved of his command, but this did little to solve the reality of diverging objectives. Emperor Leopold preferred to focus Imperial resources on the Upper Rhine, the Spanish wanted to recoup their losses in the Spanish Netherlands, while the Dutch prioritised retaking Grave and Maastricht. Accordingly, the Spanish returned to their garrisons, the Imperial troops recrossed the Meuse, and William assumed command of operations at Grave. Besieged since 28 June, the town finally surrendered on 29 October.

Condé received a state reception at Versailles for Seneffe, but his health was failing and the casualties had diminished Louis' trust in his abilities. He temporarily assumed command of French troops in the Rhineland in July 1675, but retired before the end of the year. In the longer term, Seneffe confirmed Louis' preference for positional warfare, ushering in a period where siege and manoeuvre dominated military tactics. The war became one of attrition, and although both sides were of similar strength, neither was yet ready to negotiate peace.

== Sources ==
- Anonymous (1744). The History of England, During the Reigns of K. William, Q. Anne and K George I, with an Introductory Review of the Reigns of the Royal Brothers Charles and James, Volume 1. Daniel Brown.
- Bodart, Gaston (1908). Militar-Historisches Kriegs-Lexikon V1: 1618-1905 (in German) (2010 ed.). Kessinger Publishing. ISBN 978-1167991554.
- Clodfelter, Micheal (2002). Warfare and Armed Conflicts: A Statistical Reference to Casualty and Other Figures 1500-1999. McFarland & Co. ISBN 978-0786412044.
- De Hooge, Romeyn (1680). The Netherland-Historian Containing a True and Exact Relation of What Hath Passed in the Late Warrs (2018 ed.). Forgotten Books. ISBN 978-0484752152.
- De Périni, Hardÿ (1896). Batailles françaises, Volume V (in French). Ernest Flammarion.
- De Sévigné, Marie Rabutin-Chantal (1822). De St-Germain, Pierre Marie Gault (ed.). Letters of Madame De Sévigné, Volume III; to the Count de Bussy, 5 September 1674 (in French).
- Dupuy, R. Ernest; Dupuy, Trevor, eds. (1970). The Collins Encyclopedia of Military History: From 3500 B.C. to the Present (2007 ed.). BCA.
- Holmes, Richard (2009). Marlborough; England's Fragile Genius. Harper Press. ISBN 978-0007225729.
- Hutton, Ronald (1989). Charles II King of England, Scotland and Ireland. Clarendon Press. ISBN 978-0198229117.
- Jacques, Tony (2007). Dictionary of Battles and Sieges: A Guide to 8,500 Battles from Antiquity through the Twenty-first Century, Volume 3, P-Z. Greenwood. ISBN 978-0313335389.
- Luscombe, Stephen. "Sir Walter Vane". BritishEmpire.co.uk.
- Lynn, John A. (1999). The Wars of Louis XIV, 1667–1714. Addison Wesley Longman. ISBN 978-0582056299.
- Macintosh, Claude Truman (1973). French Diplomacy during the War of Devolution, the Triple Alliance and the Treaty of Aix-la-Chapelle (PhD). Ohio State University.
- Nolan, Cathal (2008). Wars of the Age of Louis XIV, 1650–1715: An Encyclopedia of Global Warfare and Civilization. Greenwood. ISBN 978-0313330469.
- Serrano, Juan Miguel. "Pedro de Acuña y Meneses". Real Academia de la Historia (in Spanish).
- Troost, Wouter (2004). William III the Stadholder-king; A Political Biography. Ashgate. ISBN 978-0754650713.
- Tucker, Spencer C (2009). "August 11, 1674". A Global Chronology of Conflict: From the Ancient World to the Modern Middle East. Vol. Two: 1500-1774. ABC-CLIO. ISBN 978-1851096671.
- Van Nimwegen, Olaf (2010). The Dutch Army and the Military Revolutions, 1588–1688. Boydell Press. ISBN 978-1843835752.
- Van Nimwegen, Olaf (2020). De Veertigjarige Oorlog 1672–1712: de strijd van de Nederlanders tegen de Zonnekoning [The 40 Years' War 1672–1712: the Dutch struggle against the Sun King] (in Dutch). Prometheus. ISBN 978-90-446-3871-4.
- Panhuysen, Luc (2009). Rampjaar 1672: Hoe de Republiek aan de ondergang ontsnapte [Rampjaar 1672: How the Republic escaped its downfall] (in Dutch). Uitgeverij Atlas. ISBN 9789045013282.
- Grant, RG, ed. (2011). 1001 Battles That Changed the Course of History. Universe Publishing. ISBN 978-0789322333.
- Knoop, Willem Jan (1856). "Séneffe (1674): Krijgskundige beschouwingen over den oorlog van 1672-1678 in de Nederlanden" [Seneffe (1674) Military reflections on the war of 1672-1678 in the Netherlands]. Nieuwe Spectator (in Dutch).
- Algra, Hendrik; Algra, Ale (1956). Dispereert niet: Twintig eeuwen historie van de Nederlanden [Despair not: Twenty centuries of the history of the Netherlands] (in Dutch). T. Wever.
