= Army of Flanders =

16th-18th century Spanish army unit based in the Spanish Netherlands

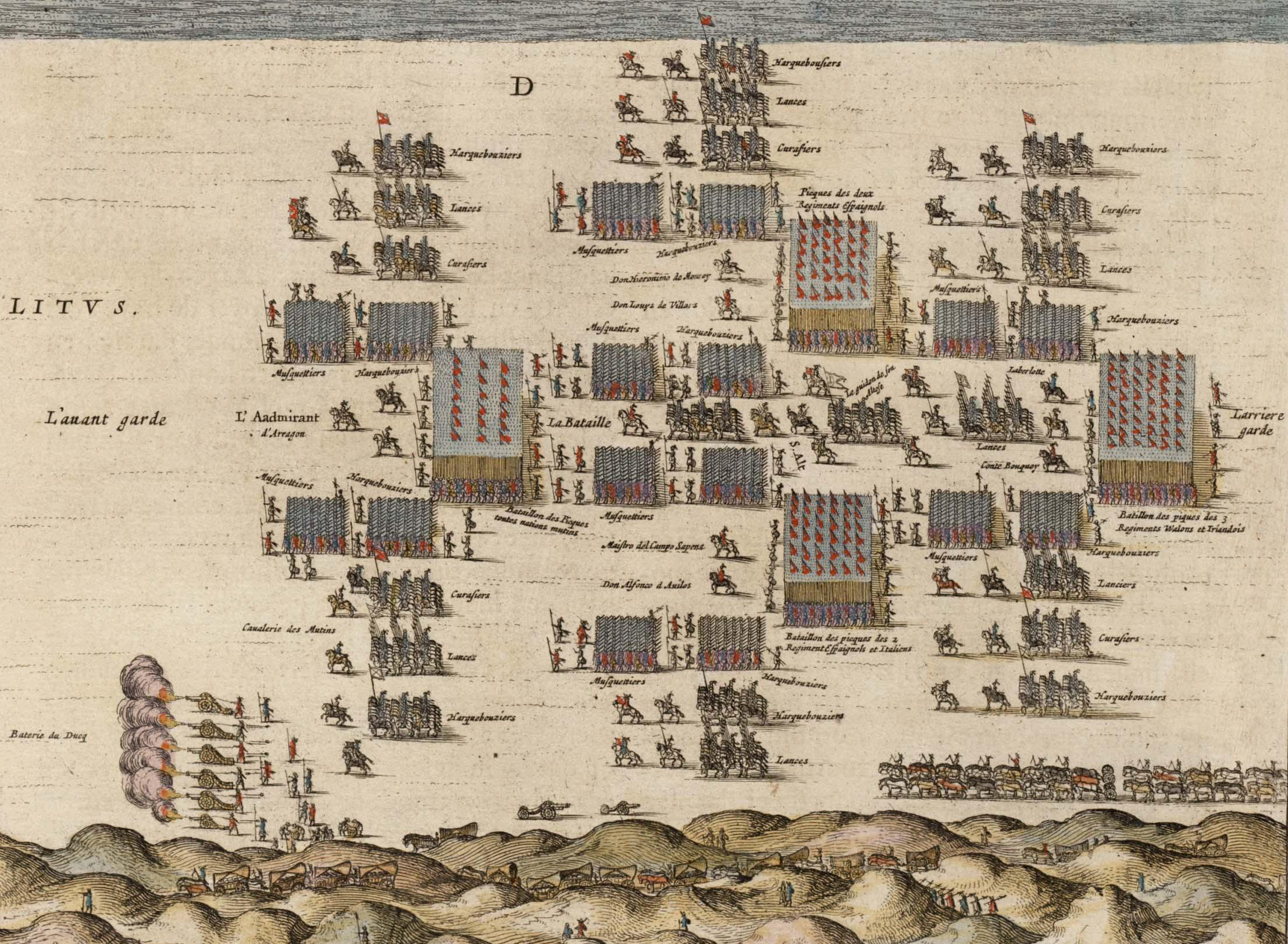
- The Army of Flanders' deployment for the Battle of Nieuwpoort (1600).
- Active: 1567–1706 (dissolution)
- Disbanded: 1706
- Country: (Spain) Spanish Empire
- Allegiance: King of Spain as hereditary prince of the Low Countries
- Branch: Spanish Army
- Type: Tercio
- Role: Security, control, and defense of the Spanish Netherlands
- Size: 10,000 (1567); 86,235 (1574); 49,765 (1607); 77,000 (1639)
- Garrison/HQ: Brussels

Commanders
- Notable commanders: Duke of Alba; Julián Romero; Sancho Dávila; Duke of Parma; Ambrosio Spínola; Cardinal-Infante Ferdinand; Marqués de Assentar

Flag of the Spanish Tercios.

The Army of Flanders (Spanish: Ejército de Flandes; Dutch: Leger van Vlaanderen) was a field army of the Spanish Army based in the Spanish Netherlands between the 16th and 18th centuries. It was one of the longest-serving field armies of the early modern era, being founded in 1567 and disbanded in 1706. Taking part in numerous battles of the Eighty Years' War and Thirty Years' War, it employed or pioneered many developing military concepts, including permanent units (tercios), barracks and military hospitals long before they were adopted in most of Europe. As a result, the Army of Flanders has been considered the world's de facto first modern professional standing army. Sustained at huge cost and at significant distances from Spain via the Spanish Road, the Army of Flanders also became infamous for successive mutinies and its ill-disciplined activity on and off the battlefield, including the sack of Antwerp in 1576.

== Creation of the Army ==
The Army of Flanders formed the longest standing army in the early modern period, operating from 1567 until 1706. It was established following a wave of iconoclasm in the provinces of the Netherlands in 1565 and 1566. The provinces were ruled by Philip II of Spain, and as trouble mounted he decided to reinforce the existing forces of the governor, Margaret of Parma, with a more substantial force. This was both a political reaction against the perceived rebellion, but also a response to the Calvinist views being shown by the protesters, establishing a religious flavour to the military response.

King Phillip's possessions stretched across Europe, and were reflected in the creation of the new army. In 1567 it was intended that 8,000 Spanish foot and 1,200 horse would form the nucleus of a new army for the Netherlands, to be sent from north Italy via Savoy. It was envisaged at this stage that the total number might potentially reach 70,000, composed of 60,000 infantry and 10,000 cavalry, under the command of Fernando Álvarez de Toledo, 3rd Duke of Alba. The force would be sent through Europe via a sequence of friendly or neutral territories, which would become known as the 'Spanish Road'; surveying of the route began in 1566.

Eventually the Spanish authorities concluded that recruiting 70,000 troops was both excessive and too expensive. In the end, only 10,000 Spanish and a regiment of German infantry under Count Alberic de Lodron were sent, although their formation, dispatch and march north was a considerable accomplishment for the time. Arriving in the Netherlands, they joined the 10,000 Walloons and Germans already serving Margaret of Parma, who then resigned in favour of Alba. Although the Spanish troops proved to be unruly, they formed an essential professional basis for the new army. Backed by the new Army of Flanders, Alba arrested and tried around 12,000 people, of whom 1,000 were condemned to death, while others had their property confiscated.

== Recruitment and support ==
The 'Spanish Road', linking Spain's northern territories with those in Italy and the Peninsula. In an ambitious undertaking, Spain used the Spanish Road to reinforce her position in the Netherlands with the new Army of Flanders in 1567.

The size of the Army of Flanders would vary over the period in response to contemporary challenges and threats. The initial force that combined in the Netherlands in 1567 was a little over 20,000 strong; after the defeat of William I of Orange the following year, the Spanish planned for an enduring force of 3,200 Walloon and 4,000 Spanish infantry along the borders of the Netherlands, backed by 4,000 Spanish infantry and 500 light cavalry forming a strategic reserve. In practice, the ensuing Dutch revolt meant that the Army had to enlarge considerably in 1572, reaching, on paper, if not in reality, a strength of 86,000 by 1574.

The Army was a multinational force, drawn primarily from the various Catholic possessions of the Habsburgs but also from the Britain and Ireland, as well as Lutheran parts of Germany. There was a clear contemporary hierarchy as to the value of different soldiers; Spanish soldiers were considered the best; then Italians, followed by English, Irish and Burgundian troops; then Germans, then finally local Walloons. Parker has argued that the Germans in fact performed much better than they were given credit for by contemporary commanders. Despite their value on the field, Spanish troops in the Army were particularly unpopular with the local people, and at two key moments were sent out of the Netherlands to assuage local opinion.

Recruitment occurred by various methods, including the commissioning of recruiting captains, who would attempt to enroll volunteers from a given recruiting region each year, and contractors, who would attempt to hire troops from across Europe. It is estimated that around 25% of the Army had served their military apprenticeships elsewhere, with more than 50% recruited outside the Low Countries. At its best, this system could achieve remarkable surges – the increase in the Army in 1572 used all these methods, and its success was a major accomplishment for the Spanish military establishment. During the 1590s, there was increasingly fierce competition for suitable veterans among Catholic France, embroiled in its civil wars of religion, the Habsburg Empire's other commitments and the Army of Flanders, with premiums being paid for transfers into the respective armies. By the early 17th century, the similarities between the Habsburg army of Hungary and the Army of Flanders made competition for recruits particularly intense. The cost of recruiting for the Army created tensions between Philip II's policy in the Netherlands, and his need to maintain a strong presence in the Mediterranean against the Ottoman Empire. Although volunteers were the norm, in extremis other methods could be used; Spain raised a tercio of Catalan criminals to fight in Flanders, a trend Philip II continued for most Catalan criminals for the rest of his reign. Pay remained fixed throughout most of the period, three escudos per day up until 1634, then four escudos thereafter.

At the highest social level, the Army of Flanders enjoyed a sequence of senior officers drawn from the nobility. Having senior noble commanders was considered extremely important in the Army, more so than in equivalent armies in Europe. At the lowest, the Army, like most of the period, had a substantial train of camp followers. Drawn from the lower classes, they made up a large percentage of the overall size of the Army in the field, and represented a considerable logistical burden in campaigns.

As time went on, the Army of Flanders began to enjoy various distinctly modern institutions, often before they were adopted by the rest of Europe. Alba set up a military hospital at Mechelen in the Duchy of Brabant in 1567; it was closed the following year, but after many complaints by mutineers it reopened in 1585, ultimately having 49 staff and 330 beds, paid for partially by the troops. The 'Garrison of our Lady of Hal' was created as a more permanent rest home for crippled veterans. A public trustee was also appointed in 1596 to administer the wills of soldiers who had fallen in service. After 1609, a number of small barracks (baraques, called after the French version of the Catalan barraca) were created away from the main urban centres to house the Army – a move that was eventually copied by other nations.

The army reached its peak size in January 1640 with 88,280 effectives. Of these 22.4% were Spanish, 48.2% Walloon/Flemish, 19.4% German, 5% Italian, 3.5% British or Irish, and 1.4% Burgundian. Its peak size prior to the Twelve Years Truce was reached in April 1588, with 63,455 effectives. These were 16.2% Spanish, 50.5% Walloon/Flemish, 18.9% German, 8.9% Italian, 2.9% Burgundian, and 2.6% British. In general, Spanish troops usually numbered less than a fifth of the army's strength (in September of 1572 for example, out of 67,259 troops only 17.1% were Spanish; the rest were Walloon/Flemish or German). From 1567 to 1607 overall, the Spanish monarchy sent 127,752 soldiers (Spanish, Italians, and Portuguese) to Flanders by the either Spanish Road (114,633) or by sea (13,120). From 1620 to 1639, the Spanish monarchy sent an 68,294 additional troops (38,743 by the Road and 29,551 by sea). Overall, from 1567 to 1639 and including peacetime years, over 200,000 Spanish, Italian, and Portuguese soldiers were sent to Flanders. An additional 11,250 men were recruited into the army of Flanders from the British Isles in 1621 to 1639, mostly Irish (another 22,000 Irishmen entered the Army of Flanders in 1641-1653, for a total of 33,250). German and Wallon/Flemish troops did not take the Spanish Road or ships but rather were recruited locally.

== Character of warfare and the Army ==
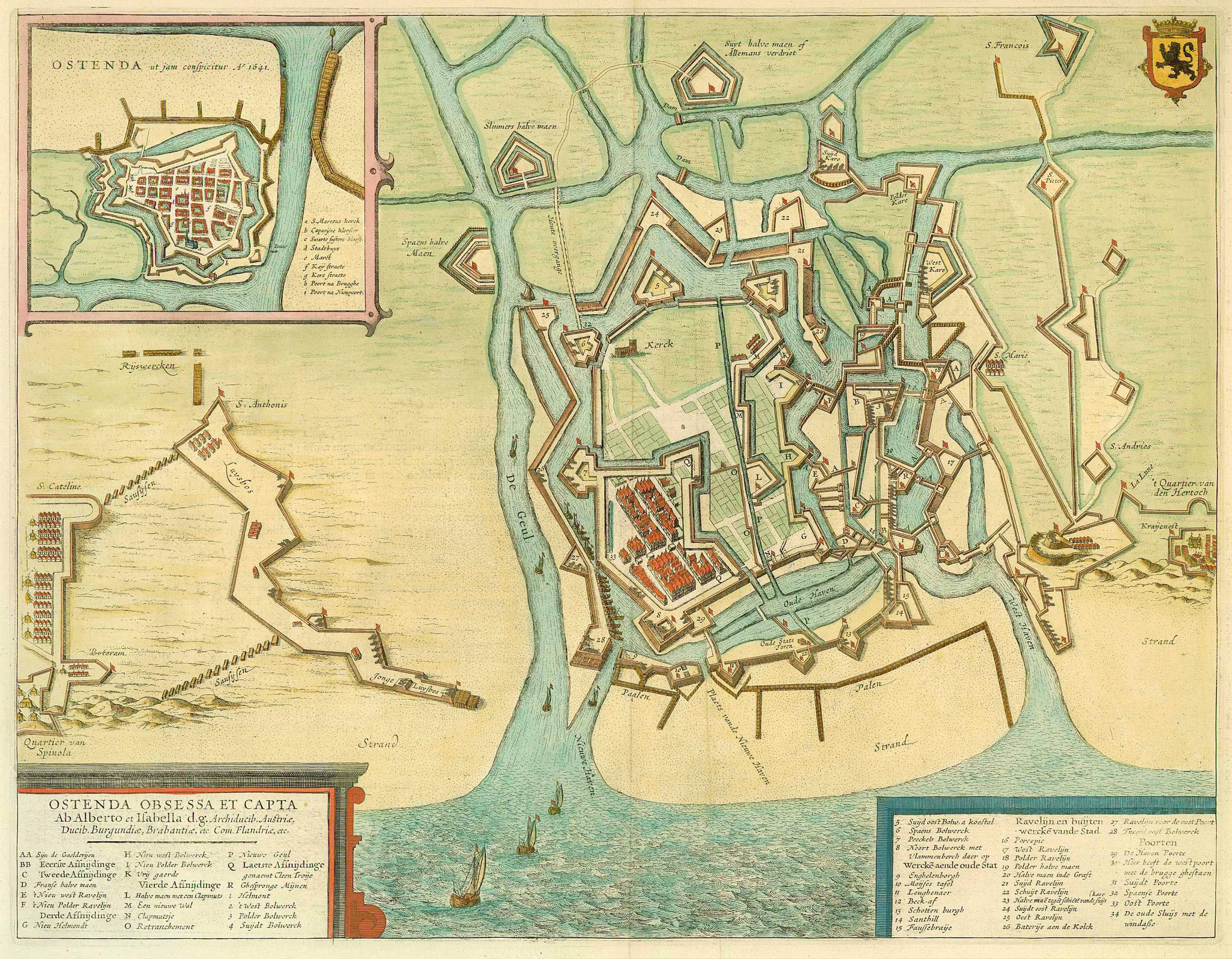
A map showing the extensive polygonal fortifications around the city of Ostend, 1601–4, a prolonged siege which cost the Army of Flanders 80,000 casualties, and the Dutch 60,000.

The Army of Flanders had been built upon the concept of the Spanish tercio, a pike-heavy infantry formation that well suited the nature of warfare in the Netherlands. The large areas of flat ground, the platteland, was criss-crossed by rivers and drainage channels, dotted by numerous towns and cities well placed to dominate the surrounding landscape, increasingly defended with polygonal fortifications. Siege warfare, rather than set-piece battles, dominated the Eighty Years' War, especially in the 16th century. Away from the major sieges, the war took on an almost guerilla style of small engagements and skirmishes, with much of both the Army of Flanders and the Dutch forces dispersed across the countryside; in 1639, for example, just under half of the Army, then 77,000 strong, was distributed across 208 small garrisons. This pattern reflected the Dutch disposition as well. Siege warfare was extremely expensive, both in terms of casualties and money. In 1622 the siege of Bergen-op-Zoom cost Spinola 9,000 men, whilst the siege of Ostend in 1601-4 cost the Army of Flanders 80,000 in casualties. The siege of Breda during 1624–5 was so expensive financially that the advance had to pause through 1625 – no more money was available to exploit the success.

In the 17th century, the conflict gradually changed, as the Spanish-Dutch borders became smaller and more secure and the number of sieges slowly reduced. The Army of Flanders gradually changed in response to these developments in warfare. The Spanish experiences fighting the Swedish, with their more flexible, firepower-oriented tactics of open battle, resulted in a decision to alter the balance of the Flanders tercios in 1634. A new ratio of 75% musketeers to 25% pike was decided on; this delivered more firepower, but was weaker in defending against cavalry, as was demonstrated at Rocroi (1643). In practice this adjusted ratio was only applied to newly formed units. There were also attempts to introduce the heavier musket to replace the lighter arquebus; the poor physical quality of new recruits, who could often not lift the heavier weapon, however, meant that this rule often had to be broken in practice, the local Walloons being felt to be particularly weak and requiring the arquebus. The efforts to deploy the Army of Flanders against France also encouraged changes. Generally speaking, the Army required more infantry for operations in the north against the Dutch, and more cavalry for operations in the south against the French. The Army of Flanders was rarely strong in terms of cavalry, however; in 1572 Alba had discharged all his heavy cavalry, and until the 1630s the Army's cavalry was mainly light cavalry, used to patrol the platteland. Horses themselves were often in short supply – after the relief of Rouen in 1592, for example, two thirds of the Spanish cavalry lacked mounts.

On campaign, the Army of Flanders were considered highly disciplined in the field, being cohesive, with good support facilities. When necessary, they could achieve significant military feats, such as their building of a bridge over the Seine to escape pursuit in 1592. By contrast, even by early modern standards the Army was considered very ill-disciplined off the field, as illustrated by a colloquial Spanish phrase in response to unruly behaviour which came rhetorically to question whether the person believed they were serving in Flanders.

== Role in the campaigns of the Dutch Revolt, 1566–1609 ==
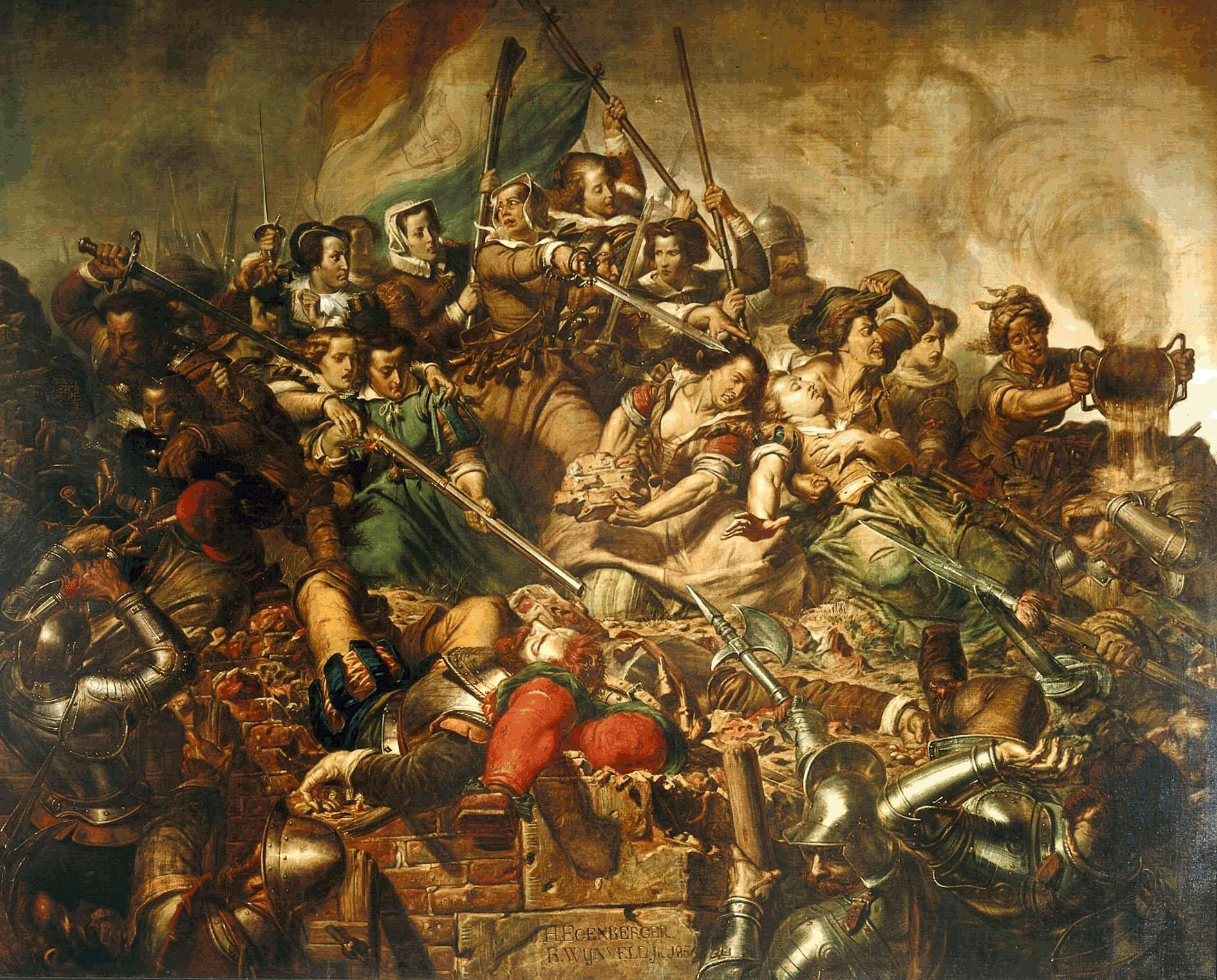
Kenau Simonsdochter Hasselaer defending the walls during the Siege of Haarlem (1572–1573). The successful siege cost the Army of Flanders 1,000 men.

The Army of Flanders was to play a key part in all the campaigns of the Dutch Revolt (1567–1609). The Duke of Alba had first brought the army into Flanders, and despite losing the Battle of Heiligerlee (1568) to William I of Orange, the rebel leader, was able to pacify the north until a resurgence of rebel activity occurred in 1572. Alba sent his son Fadrique to quell the insurrection with some 30,000 men, Spaniards, Walloons, and Germans. The Army of Flanders crushed the weak defenses of Zutphen and put nearly every man in town to death, hanging some by the feet while drowning 500 others. At Naarden the women were publicly raped, then every living thing was put to the sword. The Army of Flanders now pushed through Amsterdam and, basing there, advanced against Haarlem at the beginning of December 1572. Haarlem had a garrison of some 4,000 troops led by Wigbolt Ripperda. The citizens would fight resolutely alongside the soldiers. For weeks on end, the Spanish guns pounded the city defences but to no avail; they also tried tunnelling towards the city walls to mine the remaining defences but the Dutch dug counter-tunnels and blew up any Spanish and their tunnels they might meet. From the outside, William of Orange made use of the winter freeze to smuggle in provisions over the frozen Haarlem Lake on sledges. This was done under the very noses of the shocked Spanish, who had never seen skating. Even after the freeze, in early 1573, William's Sea Beggars maintained the supply line by boat under the cover of a thick mist which hung over the lake. The Dutch made frequent sorties, cut off the heads of the soldiers they captured and rolled them into the Spanish lines in barrels; the Spaniards hanged their prisoners on crosses facing the enemy; and the Dutch defenders taunted the Spanish besiegers by staging parodies of Catholic rituals on the cities ramparts.

Unrelenting savage raids by both sides continued through February and March 1573, the Army of Flanders suffering heavy losses. Fadrique was by now so exasperated that he wrote to his father, asking if he might break off the siege. The Duke of Alba sneeringly replied that he would send his own wife if Fadrique was not up to the job. The turning point was reached in early April 1573 when Spanish-led ships from Amsterdam routed the Sea Beggars on the Haarlem Lake. This was the end of the clandestine supply routes. William sent 5,000 men in an effort to relieve Haarlem. The Spanish learnt of the plan and the troops were slaughtered in an ambush. After seven months, when the city's inhabitants had been reduced to eating weeds, rats, and shoe leather, the city surrendered. The Haarlem garrison was massacred, and the townsfolk were raped and pillaged. The horrors of the siege were somewhat offset by subsequent events. King Philip diverted funds to his Mediterranean campaign against the Ottomans and the Army of Flanders mutinied due to the resultant lack of wages. They eventually moved on but failed to capture Alkmaar and Leiden. Unable to deal with the crisis, Alba was replaced by the more moderate Luis de Zúñiga y Requesens in 1573. The Army of Flanders retained its battlefield superiority: Sancho d'Avila with 5,000 Spaniards and 1,000 Walloons destroyed Louis of Nassau's German mercenary army at the Battle of Mookerheyde on 14 April 1574, killing both him and his brother Henry of Nassau-Dillenburg. Along with the loss of his brothers, William had to mourn the loss of 3,800 soldiers killed; Spanish casualties were no more than 200. Requesens was hampered by the bankruptcy of the Spanish Crown in 1575, which left him without funds to maintain his army. The Army of Flanders mutinied, and shortly after Requesens' death in 1576 almost effectively ceased to exist, disintegrating in various mutinous factions. Don John of Austria took over the command of the province, attempting to restore some semblance of military discipline but failing to prevent the Sack of Antwerp by mutinous soldiers.

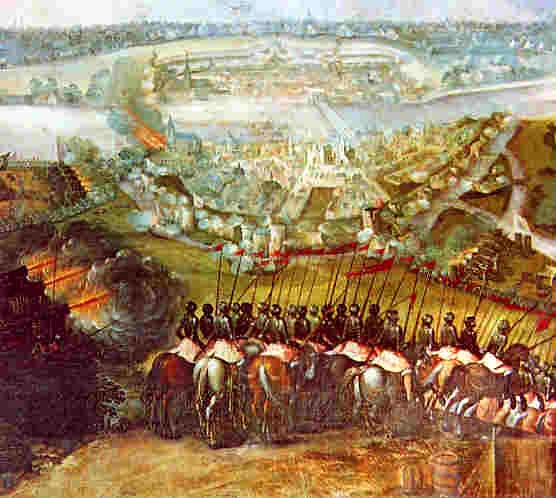
The Army of Flanders taking Maastricht in 1579

By the time that Alexander Farnese, the future Duke of Parma, took control of the army in 1578, the Low Countries were increasingly split between the rebellious north and those southern provinces still loyal to Spain. With the arrival of large numbers of troops from Spain, Farnese set about consolidating Spanish control in the south, beginning with Maastricht. Farnese commenced the Siege of Maastricht on 12 March 1579. He ordered his troops to sap the walls. The inhabitants of Maastricht too were digging to reach the Spanish tunnels. Deep underground the fighting continued. Hundreds of Spanish soldiers died as boiling water was poured into their tunnels. Others died because of a lack of oxygen when the Dutch defenders ignited fires within them. Another 500 Spanish soldiers died when a mine, which they planned to use to blow up the wall, exploded prematurely. In the night of 29 June, Farnese managed to get into the city while the exhausted defenders were asleep. Spanish units who breached the city walls first raped the women (some of whom, in fighting to defend the city, had transgressed gender roles and forfeited their right to mercy), then massacred the population. By 1585, Farnese had reconquered the cities of Brussels, Ghent, and Antwerp, as well as the Duchy of Brabant and most of Flanders. At this point the Army was diverted from its original function of fighting the northern rebels to addressing the problem of England, at war with Spain. Farnese believed that the Army could hope to cross the Channel in force, relying upon a Catholic uprising in England to support it; instead, Philip decided to undertake a naval attack using the Spanish Armada in 1588. The Army of Flanders moved against Ostend and Dunkirk in preparations for a follow-up manoeuver across the Channel in support of the Armada, but the defeat of the main naval force brought an end to these plans.

Farnese was ultimately removed as governor, being replaced by Peter Ernst I von Mansfeld-Vorderort in 1592 and Archduke Ernest of Austria in 1594. By the time Archduke Albert of Austria – the husband of Infanta Isabella Clara Eugenia was given custody of the Netherlands by the Spanish king in 1595, the Dutch north appeared to be an increasingly independent country, protected by the able military commander Maurice of Orange and his Dutch States Army. The Dutch continued to consolidate their control over various towns through a sequence of successful sieges, whilst the Army of Flanders saw itself increasingly pointed southwards, against France, being used as a strike force in 1590 and 1592, and fighting to take Doullens, Cambrai (1595) and Calais (1596). The Army of Flanders also operated in Germany, capturing Neuss (1586), Bonn (1588) and Rheinberg (1590). Despite the failure of the Army to reoccupy the north, it continued to the end of the period as an effective fighting force, with its campaigns in 1605 and 1606 being notable for their 'vitality' and vigour.

== Mutinies in the Army of Flanders ==
The Army of Flanders had become particularly well known for its frequent mutinies, especially during the 1570s. These mutinies, or alteraciones, stemmed from the mismatch between Spain's strategic military ambitions and her fiscal means. Spain was the only European power to be able to project military force on the scale and distance of the Army of Flanders; backed by gold and especially silver from her American colonies, Spain had huge funds available. In practice, however, the costs of such a large military force outstripped even Spain's ability to pay for it. In 1568, the defence costs for the army in Flanders amounted to 1,873,000 florins a year. By 1574, the enlarged army was costing 1,200,000 florins a month. Even with increased taxation, the Low Countries could not hope to support such a force, but funds from Castile were limited – only 300,000 florins arrived each month at the time from Spain. This underlying fiscal tension was only just manageable in normal years; in years like 1575, when King Phillip II was forced to default on his loans yet again, there was simply no money available to pay the Army of Flanders. Mutinies usually ensued – ultimately the Army of Flanders mutinied 45 times between 1572 and 1609, with the mutinies coming to have a formal character and process of their own. The longest mutiny was the Mutiny of Hoogstraten, which ran from 1 September 1602 to 18 May 1604.

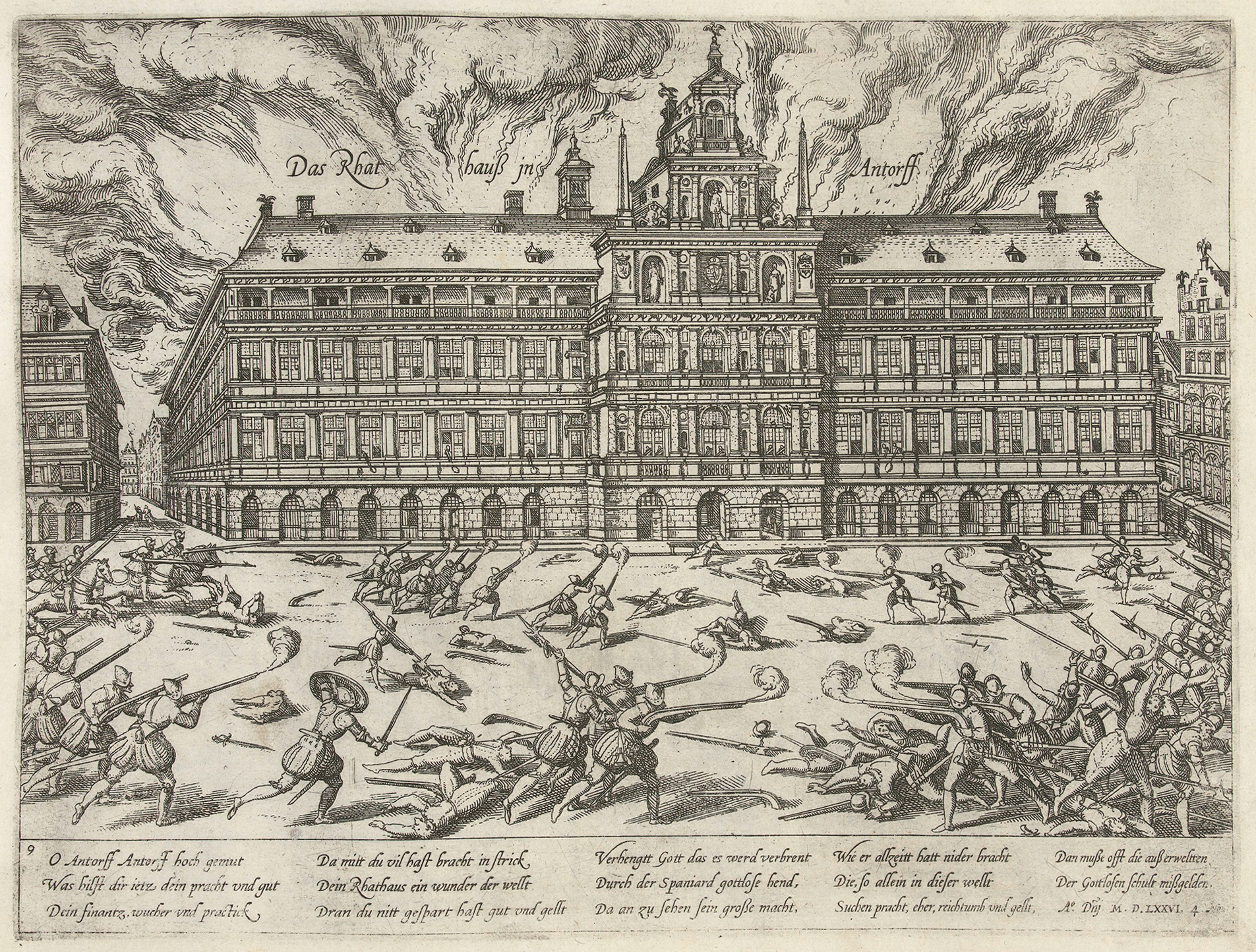
Mutinous troops of the Army of Flanders ransack the Grote Markt during the Sack of Antwerp, in a Dutch engraving of 1576 by Franc Hogenburg.

Broadly speaking, these mutinies resulted in three problems. First, the mutinies were unpredictable and frightening events for any military leader to deal with. Second, they encouraged the troops to live off the locals, extracting 'free lodgings, and encouraging theft and plunder' which drastically reduced local support for the Spanish cause. Third, the pauses in the campaigns caused by the mutinies allowed the Dutch to recover lost ground each time.

The first mutiny occurred in 1573, with the soldiers ultimately being paid off with 60 florins each, two further mutinies followed, freezing the progress of the Spanish campaign. Mutinies continued in 1575 and 1576, up until the death of the Army's commander, Requesens. The Army effectively collapsed, sustaining itself by extorting money and food from the local peoples – widespread fresh Dutch revolts recommenced, accompanied by a general outcry of 'death to the Spaniards'. The new commander in the Netherlands, Don John of Austria was unable to restore order, resulting in the Sack of Antwerp, a horrific event in which 1,000 houses were destroyed and 8,000 people killed by rampaging soldiers. The States General, influenced by the sack, signed the Pacification of Ghent only four days later, unifying the rebellious provinces and the loyal provinces with the goal of removing all Spanish soldiers from the Netherlands, as well as stopping the persecution of heretics. This effectively destroyed every accomplishment the Spanish had made in the past ten years. Attempting to mollify the situation, Don John removed his Spanish troops from the country in 1577, before recalling them shortly afterwards when the political situation worsened again. When Don John died, Alexander Farnese replaced him as governor and set out to moderate Spanish policy in Catholic Flanders while reducing Protestant outposts by force. This policy backfired. In 1579 his troops sacked Maastricht, killing over 10,000 civilians.

== Role in the Thirty Years' War, 1618–48 ==
The Battle of White Mountain, 1620, a triumph for the Army of Flanders and the Army of the Catholic League.

During the opening campaigns of the Thirty Years' War (1618–1648), the Army of Flanders played an important role for the Imperial factions as a mobile field army. During the Palatinate phase (1618–1625), the Army, 20,000 strong, was sent under Ambrogio Spinola to support the Emperor, pinning down the Protestant Union whilst Saxony intervened against Bohemia. Joined by the Army of the Catholic League, the two forces decisively defeated Frederick V of the Palatinate at the Battle of White Mountain, near Prague, in 1620. In addition to becoming Catholic once more, Bohemia would remain in Habsburg hands for nearly three hundred years. The Army of Flanders then outflanked the Dutch in preparation for a renewed offensive against the United Provinces, occupying the Electoral Palatinate.

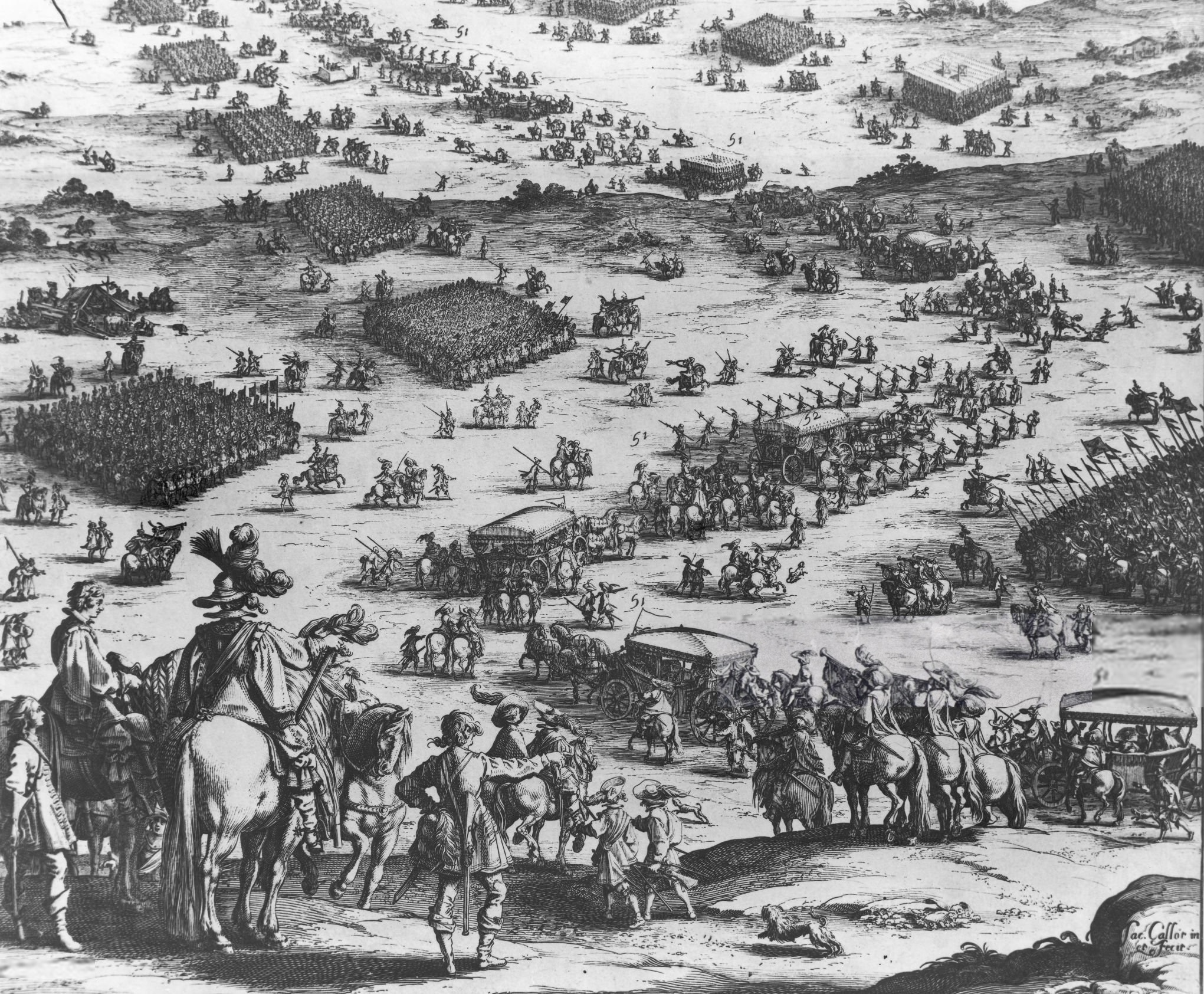
The Siege of Breda in 1624 by Jacques Callot, showing the tercios of Army of Flanders.

Having made a success on the battlefield, the Army then turned against the Dutch. Spinola made considerable progress from 1621 onwards, finally retaking Breda after a famous siege in 1624. The cost of this siege, however, was far in excess of Spain's resources, and the Army was put on the defensive for the remainder of the war. Steadily placed under increased pressure, the Army's position could have been untenable, but in 1634 Spain exploited the Spanish Road once again, bringing fresh forces from Spanish Italy under the command of the Cardinal-Infante Ferdinand of Austria; they destroyed Sweden's army at the Battle of Nördlingen before cutting west to reinforce the Army of Flanders. Any Spanish advantage, however, would be undercut by the new Franco-Dutch alliance that threatened to engulf the Spanish Netherlands in a pincer movement between her two enemies. France and Oxenstierna agreed to a treaty at Hamburg, extending the annual French subsidy of 400,000 riksdalers for three years, but Sweden would not fight against Spain.

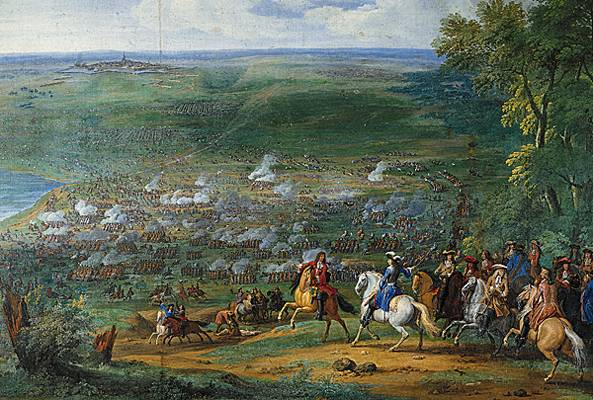
The Battle of Rocroi (1643) resulting in the destruction of many of the long-serving professionals at the heart of the Army of Flanders.

With the French entry into the war in 1636, the Army of Flanders initially made a good showing, counter-attacking and threatening Paris in 1636. Over the next few years, however, France's military strength continued to grow and the earlier successes of the Army would be overshadowed by their defeat at the Battle of Rocroi in 1643. Spain had responded to French pressure on Franche-Comté and Catalonia that year by deploying the Army from Flanders, through the Ardennes into northern France, threatening an advance onto Paris. The ensuing battle, as the Army set siege to Rocroi, turned against the Spanish and their defeat became inevitable. The French commander, Louis, duc d'Enghien, attempted to negotiate terms for surrender for the remaining Spanish infantry, but a misunderstanding led to the French troops attacking the Spanish forces with no quarter being given. Of the 18,000 strong Spanish army, 7,000 prisoners were taken and 8,000 killed, with the majority of these losses being the much-prized Spanish soldiers.

The destruction of so much of the Army had immediate strategic ramifications. Spain could no longer continue its planned advance on Paris, and within five weeks had begun to make the first moves towards a negotiations that would culminate in the 1648 Peace of Westphalia. Traditionally, historians have traced the decline and collapse of Spanish military power in Europe from the Battle of Rocroi; the defeat, however, can be overstated. A substantial part of the Army of Flanders, some 6,000 men under Beck, failed to turn up in time to fight at Rocroi and formed the nucleus of the new Army of Flanders afterwards. Some recent historians have increasingly seen 1643 as a somewhat arbitrary date – Spain remained powerful and capable of defending itself in Flanders for many years afterwards.

== The final years of the Army, 1648–1706 ==
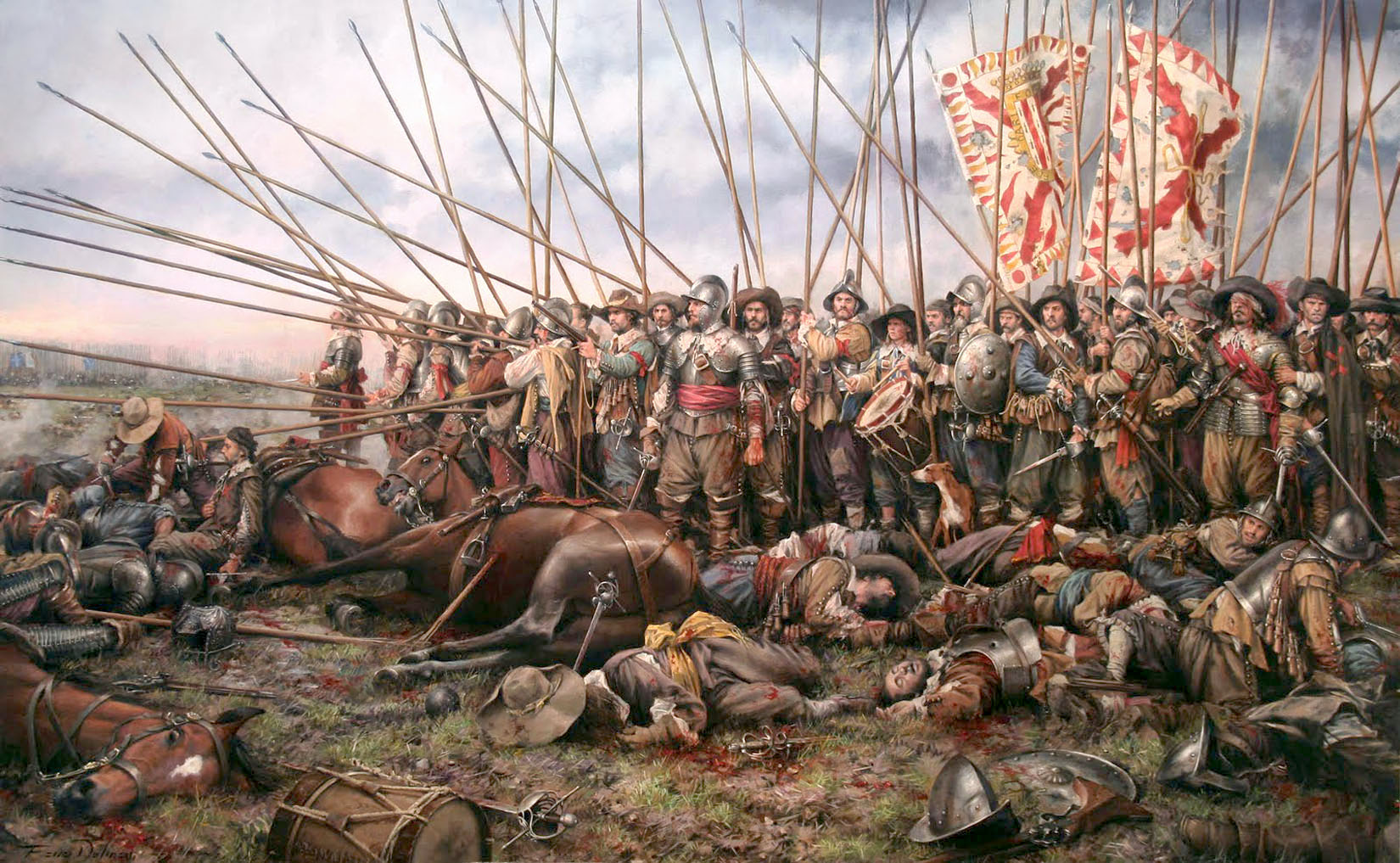
Battle of Rocroi. Some point to successes like Valenciennes, 1656 as showing the arbitrariness of using Rocroi, 1643, as the start of the decline.

After the end of the Thirty Years' War, a financially constrained Spanish government steadily reduced the size of the Army of Flanders; this trend continued after the end of the Franco-Spanish War that continued after the Peace of Westphalia in 1648. Despite its decline in numbers and quality, the army remained "an opponent to be treated with respect" at least until the 1650s, though it started to rely more on auxiliary forces such as the allied army of Louis, Grand Condé and a Royalist Army in Exile loyal to Charles II of England. The Battle of Dunkirk in 1658, resulting in a defeat for the Army of Flanders at the hands of the French, produced a renewed peace. From 1659, Madrid increasingly relied on the aid of Dutch and English troops to restrain Louis XIV of France's ambitions to annex the Spanish Netherlands (roughly present-day Belgium and Luxembourg), in which Spain showed declining interest after more than a century of war.

Recent scholarship has highlighted the deep-seated problems emerging in the Spanish state and military from the 1630s onwards. The Count-Duke of Olivares, the key advisor to King Philip IV, had attempted to reenergize the Army of Flanders by injecting increasing numbers of the aristocracy into the senior ranks; the results had included rank inflation, a fragmented system of command and a raft of temporary appointments. By the 1650s, the officer-to-man ratio in the Army had reached the unsustainable levels of one to four. Recruitment had steadily shifted; by the mid-17th century, troops were increasingly being raised less by contractor and contractors, and more by either capturing men or selecting them as levies from cities and towns via lotteries, known as quintas or suertes. The Army especially suffered from this, as it could no longer receive adequate numbers of recruits from Spain and Italy due to France having closed the Spanish Road. Instead it had to rely on locally raised forces or mercenaries who were not up to the old standards. The infrastructure and support services were considerably improved, but not as much as elsewhere, and the Army was increasingly perceived as a 'broken force' in European affairs. With money continuing to be tight, visitors to the provinces in the second half of the century reported seeing the Army in an appalling state, with soldiers begging and short of food. Despite these problems, the Army continued its reputation for professionalism; when Spain became involved in the 1672 to 1678 Franco-Dutch War, three of its tercios formed part of the Allied army under William of Orange which sought to outflank French forces near Seneffe in August 1674. Taken by surprise, the Spanish infantry held their positions for most of the day, their courage and discipline rescuing William from what could otherwise have been a serious defeat. They were finally forced to retreat in the early evening, leaving behind their dead, which included their commander the Marqués de Assentar.

=== First modern military and mathematics academy in Europe ===
In 1675 the Army of Flanders enrolled in the first modern Royal Military Academy in Europe. The Royal Military and Mathematics Academy of Brussels (spanish: Academia Militar del Ejército de los Países Bajos; also known as the Royal Military and Mathematics Academy of the Netherlands or Academia Militar de Bruselas) was founded in Brussels (1675) by its sole director Sebastián Fernández de Medrano (Mora, 1646 - Brussels, February 18, 1705), Battle General, General of the Artillery, General Prefect, Alferez and Master of Mathematics, at the request of the Governor of the Habsburg Netherlands, Carlos de Aragón de Gurrea, 9th Duke of Villahermosa, in order to correct the shortage of artillerymen and engineers from the Spanish Tercio. The 9th Duke of Villahermosa wrote to Charles II on 18 July, 1680 declaring Medrano so effective that "the experience previously acquired and the theory of mathematics have been so advanced [by Medrano] that H. M. no longer needs to make use of engineers and artisans from other nations, in whom confidence risks so much, we have achieved this by having Spaniards experts in these matters."

Sebastian Fernandez de Medrano chose the new Governor of the Habsburg Netherlands Francisco Antonio de Agurto Salcedo Medrano Zuñiga, 1st Marquess of Gastañaga as the patron and protector of the Brussels Academy and dedicated his academic book The Engineer Part One, of Modern Military Architecture to the Marquess of Gastañaga on 1 March 1687. In 1688, the army of Flanders led by the Marquess of Gastañaga numbered 25,539 officers and men and by 1689 the total strength of his army increased to 31,743 men. This was the peak strength of the Army of Flanders in the Nine Years War. This Royal Military Academy of Flanders was renowned for the diverse origin of its officer cadets, for the innovative features of its plan of studies, the theoretical and practical basis of its learning process apart from the relevant assignments given to its officer cadets who were also known as the “Great Masters of War” coined by the treatise writer, Count of Clonard. It was created in Brussels to train the most distinguished officers in the peninsula in the Art of War. This center can be considered as the first project of General Military Training as well as the forefather of the future Academia General Militar.

By the end of the century, the final days of the Army of Flanders were not far away. The War of the Spanish Succession (1701–14) saw French and Allied invasions and the disintegration of central Spanish authority in the peninsula, which destroyed the basis of the Army of Flanders and it was formally disbanded in 1706.

== Cultural legacy ==
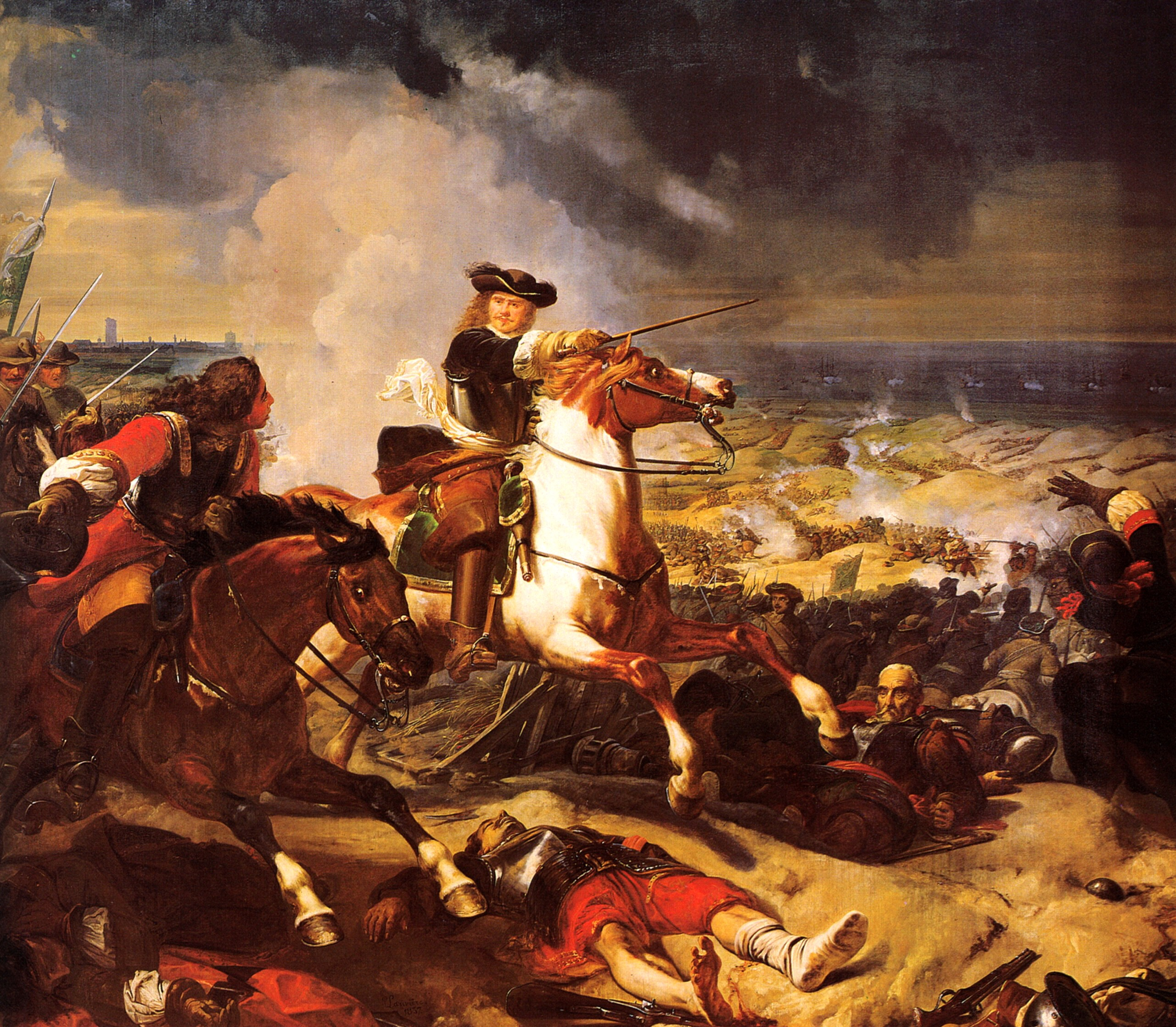
The Battle of the Dunes by Charles-Philippe Larivière, 1837. The Battle of the Dunes in 1658, another defeat illustrating the steady decline of the Army of Flanders during the second half of the 17th century.

The Army of Flanders left a strong influence on various parts of Spanish culture. The patron saint of the modern Spanish infantry, for example, is the Immaculate Conception. This stems from an incident in 1585, when during the Battle of Empel, the tercio of Francisco Arias de Bobadilla was trapped on the island of Bommel by the Dutch squadron of Admiral Holako. Stranded in mid-winter, his men were fast running out of food, but de Bobadilla refused to surrender. One of his soldiers, digging a trench, then discovered a wooden picture of the Immaculate Conception – de Bobadilla placed this on a makeshift altar, and prayed for divine intervention. That night the weather turned yet colder and the river Meuse surrounding the island froze over; de Bobadilla's men were able to cross the river on the ice, raid Holako's stranded ships and defeat the Dutch. The Army of Flanders adopted the Immaculate Conception as their patroness, and in turn this was followed by the modern Spanish infantry.

Various phrases from the military in Flanders remain in the Spanish language. Poner una pica en Flandes, – 'to put a pike in Flanders' – refers to something extremely difficult or costly, referring to the expense involved in sending Spanish forces to Flanders. Pasar por los bancos de Flandes, – 'to go through the banks of Flanders', refers to overcoming a difficulty, such as the notorious sand-bank protecting the river-strewn Netherlands.

== See also ==
- Eighty Years' War
- Thirty Years' War
- Spanish Empire
- Tercio

== Bibliography ==
- Anderson, M. S. War and Society in Europe of the Old Regime, 1618–1789. London: Fontana. (1988)
- Barratt, John (2016). 'Better Begging than Fighting': The Royalist Army in Exile in the War against Cromwell 1656–1660. Solihull: Helion & Company Limited. ISBN 978-1-910777-72-5.
- Black, Jeremy. European Warfare, 1494–1660. London: Routledge. (2002)
- Black, Jeremy (1996). The Cambridge Illustrated Atlas of Warfare: Renaissance to Revolution, 1492-1792, Volume 2. Cambridge University Press.
- Davis, Paul K. 100 Decisive Battles: From Ancient Times to the Present. Oxford: Oxford University Press. (2001)
- Durant, Will; Durant, Ariel (1961). The Age of Reason Begins: A History of European Civilization in the Period of Shakespeare, Bacon, Montaigne, Rembrandt, Galileo, and Descartes: 1558–1648. Simon and Schuster. p. 454. ISBN 9780671013202.
- Gonzalez de Leon, Fernando. The Road to Rocroi: Class, Culture and Command in the Spanish Army of Flanders, 1567–1659. Leiden: Brill. (2008)
- Grossman, Mark (2007). World Military Leaders: A Biographical Dictionary. Infobase Publishing.
- van der Hoeven, Marco. 'Introduction', in van der Hoeven, Marco (ed) Exercise of arms: warfare in the Netherlands, 1568–1648. Leiden: CIP. (1997)
- Hale, J.R. (1985). War and Society in Renaissance Europe, 1450-1620. London: Fontana Press. ISBN 0-00-686017-6.
- Israel, Jonathan. Empires and Entrepôts: The Dutch, the Spanish Monarchy, and the Jews, 1585–1713. Continuum International Publishing Group. (1990)
- Lynch, John. Spain Under the Habsburgs, Volume One: Empire and Absolutism, 1516 to 1598. Oxford: Blackwell. (1964)
- Mackay, Ruth. The Limits of Royal Authority: Resistance and Authority in the 17th century Castile. Cambridge: Cambridge University Press. (1999)
- Munck, Thomas. 17th century Europe, 1598–1700. London: Macmillan. (1990)
- Nolan, Cathal J. (2008). Wars of the Age of Louis XIV, 1650-1715: An Encyclopedia of Global Warfare and Civilization.
- Parker, Geoffrey (1985). The Dutch Revolt (1990 ed.). Penguin. ISBN 978-0140137125.
- Parker, Geoffrey (1996). The Military Revolution: Military innovation and the rise of the West, 1500–1800. CUP. ISBN 978-0521479585.
- Parker, Geoffrey (2004). The Army of Flanders and the Spanish Road, 1567–1659 (2008 ed.). CUP. ISBN 978-0521543927.
- Pratt, Fletcher (2013). The Battles that Changed History. Courier Corporation.
- Ruff, Julius R. Violence in Early Modern Europe, 1500–1800. Cambridge: Cambridge University Press. (2001)
- Van Nimwegen, Olaf (2010). The Dutch Army and the Military Revolutions, 1588–1688. Boydell Press. ISBN 978-1843835752.
- Wedgwood, C.V. (1938). The Thirty Years War (2005 ed.). New York Review of Books. ISBN 978-1-59017-146-2.
- Zagorin, Perez (1982). Rebels and Rulers, 1500–1660. Volume II: Provincial rebellion: Revolutionary civil wars, 1560–1660. Cambridge University Press.
