= Piéton =

Coordinates: 50°25′N 4°23′E

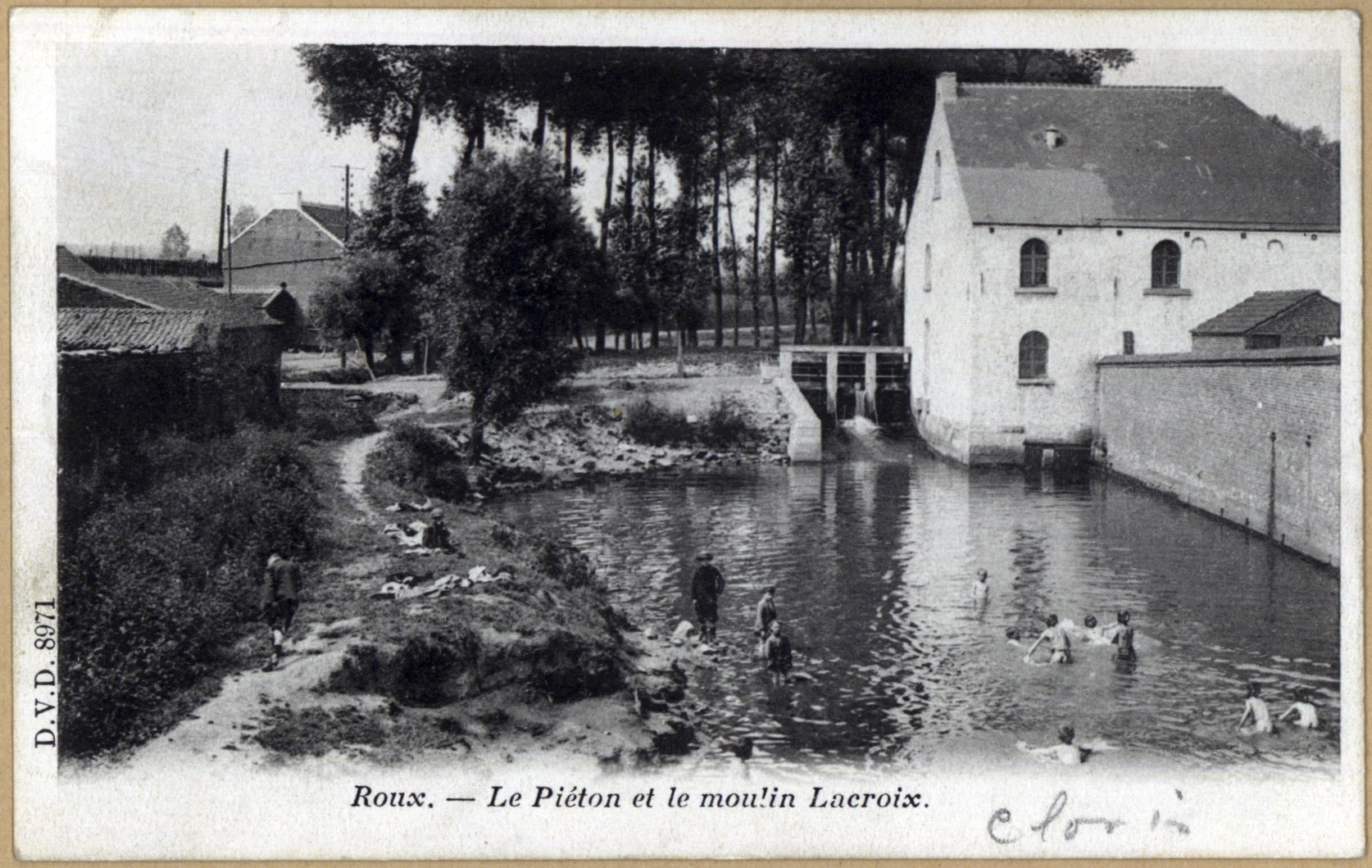
- The old mill on the Piéton at Roux. Known as the "Moulin Lacroix", it was demolished in 1952.

Location
- Country: Belgium
- Province: Hainaut

Physical characteristics
- Source
  - location: Anderlues
- Mouth
  - location: Charleroi
- Basin size: 194 km^{2} (75 sq mi)

Basin features
- Progression: Sambre→ Meuse→ North Sea

The Piéton (French pronunciation: [pjetɔ̃]) is a northern tributary of the Sambre in the Belgian Province of Hainaut. Their confluence is in Charleroi.
