= Pedro de Acuña y Meneses, Marquess of Assentar =

Portuguese-born nobleman and soldier

Pedro de Acuña y Meneses, Marqués de Assentar
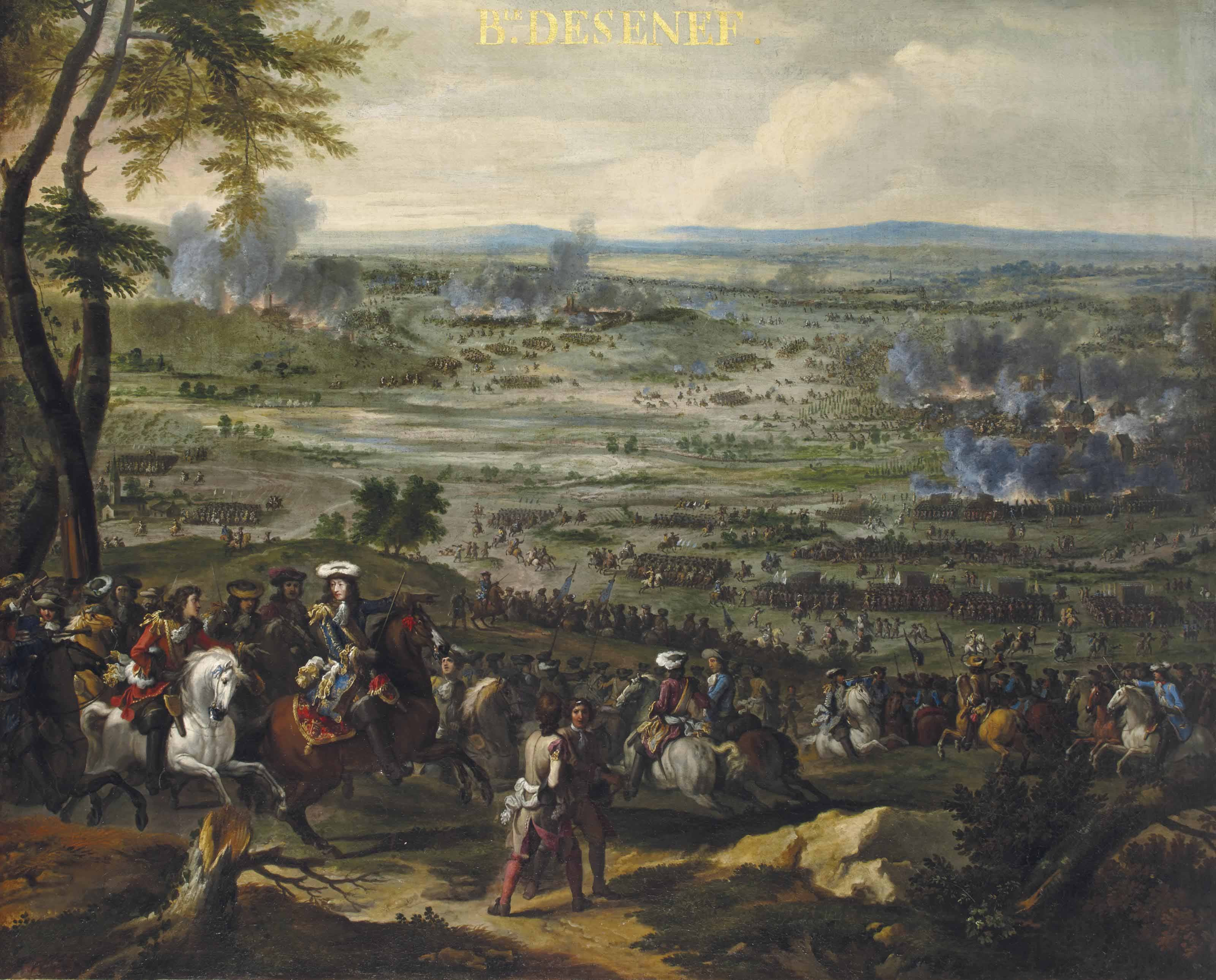
- Battle of Seneffe, where Assentar was killed on 11 August 1674

Commander, Army of Flanders
- In office 1673–1674

Governor of Ceuta
- In office 1665–1672
- Monarch: Charles II of Spain

Military commander of Novara
- In office 1662–1665
- Monarch: Philip IV of Spain

Personal details
- Born: 1607 Santar, Kingdom of Portugal
- Died: 11 August 1674 (aged 67) Seneffe, Spanish Netherlands
- Cause of death: Killed in action
- Occupation: Soldier

Military service
- Allegiance: Spain
- Rank: Maestre de campo
- Commands: Tercio of Savoy 1655-1659; Tercio of Lombardy 1659-1662
- Battles/wars: Thirty Years War; Franco-Spanish War (1635–1659); Defence of Pavia; Battle of Fortana-Santa; Franco-Dutch War; Seneffe †

Pedro de Acuña y Meneses, Marqués de Assentar (1607 to 1674), also known as Pedro da Cunha, was a Portuguese-born nobleman and soldier who served in the Spanish army during the 17th century. Appointed commander of the Army of Flanders in 1673, he was killed on 11 August 1674 at the Battle of Seneffe, then in the Spanish Netherlands.

== Personal details ==
Pedro de Acuña y Meneses was born in 1607 in Santar, part of the Braga District in Portugal (which was at the time in personal union with Spain), only child of Lope da Cunha (1590-circa 1659), Lord of Santar, and his wife Violante da Meneses.
He married Francisca de la Cueva Enríquez (1640-1666), Lady-in-waiting to Queen Mariana of Austria; she died giving birth to a daughter, Manuela (1666-1706), who became the second wife of her maternal uncle Isidoro Melchor, Marqués de Bedmar (1652-1723).

== Career ==
At the time of his birth, Portugal was part of the Iberian Union with Spain; his father was a member of the Council of Castile who was made Count of Sentar in 1636, while Pedro himself received the title Marqués de Assentar. When Portugal revolted in 1640 and declared its independence, the family remained loyal to Spain and was forced into exile in Madrid. In the first part of the Thirty Years War, Assentar served in Flanders, then transferred to Italy during the Franco-Spanish War (1635–1659). Appointed commander of the Tercio of Savoy in 1655, he led the defence of Pavia against a French army in 1655 and took part in the battle of Fortana-Santa in 1656. He inherited his father's title some time before 1659, when he took over the Tercio of Lombardy.

He became military commander of Novara in 1662, an important commercial centre in the Spanish-ruled Duchy of Milan, before being appointed Governor of Ceuta three years later. In 1673, Spain became involved in the Franco-Dutch War as an ally of the Dutch Republic and Assentar transferred to the Spanish Netherlands as commander of the Army of Flanders. On 11 August 1674, his unit formed part of an Allied army led by William of Orange which sought to outflank French forces under Condé near Seneffe. Taken by surprise, the Spanish infantry held their positions for most of the day, their courage and discipline helping to rescue William from what could otherwise have been a serious defeat. They were finally forced to retreat in the early evening, leaving behind their dead; these included Assentar, whose body was later returned by Condé for burial.

== Sources ==
- De Périni, Hardÿ (1896). Batailles françaises, Volume V (in French). Ernest Flammarion.
- Serrano, Juan Miguel. "Pedro de Acuña y Meneses". Real Academia de la Historia (in Spanish).
- Soto, Álex Claramunt (9 June 2019). "Los tercios de Carlos II contra la Francia de Luis XIV". Larazon.es (in Spanish).
- Van Nimwegen, Olaf (2010). The Dutch Army and the Military Revolutions, 1588–1688. Boydell Press. ISBN 978-1843835752.
