= Infantry Regiment "Saboya" No. 6 =

- Regimiento de Infantería Mecanizada "Saboya" nº 6
- Coat of Arms of the Regiment Saboya
- Active: 1537–present
- Country: Spain
- Branch: Spanish Army
- Type: Mechanized infantry
- Role: Front-line
- Size: 2 battalions
- Garrison/HQ: Bótoa, Badajoz
- Nickname(s): The terror of the French
- Engagements: Italian War of 1551–1559; Battle of Saint-Quentin (1557); Thirty Years' War; Eighty Years' War; Franco-Spanish War (1635–1659); Nine Years' War; Battle of Staffarda; Battle of Marsaglia; War of the Spanish Succession; Battle of Luzzara; Battle of Castiglione (1706); Battle of Villaviciosa; Spanish–Portuguese War (1776–77); War of the Second Coalition; War of the Oranges; Napoleonic Wars; Peninsular War; Battle of Tudela; First Siege of Zaragoza; Battle of Alcañiz; Third Siege of Girona; Mexican War of Independence; First Carlist War; Hispano-Moroccan War (1859–1860); Third Carlist War; Cuban War of Independence; Second Melillan campaign

Commanders
- Notable commanders: Álvaro de Sande; Diego Pastor; Antonio de Olaguer y Feliú; Pedro de Acuña y Meneses, Marqués de Assentar

The Infantry Regiment "Saboya" No. 6 (Spanish: Regimiento de Infantería "Saboya" nº 6) is a infantry unit of the Spanish Army, whose origins date back to 1633.

On 30 March 1633, a new Tercio of Savoy was created by dividing the existing Tercio of Lombardy; based in Cremona, the new unit consisted of 11 companies with a total of 109 officers and 1,200 men and remained in Italy until the War of the Spanish Succession, when it was transferred to Spain following the 1706 Convention of Milan. In 1707, by Royal Order of His Majesty Philip V of Spain, first Bourbon king of the Spanish Empire, it became a two battalion unit known as the Regiment of Savoy Nº 3.

Its first commander was Álvaro de Sande, first Marqués de la Piovera. The patron saint of the regiment was Our Lady of the Rosary.

== Coat of arms ==
A white cross in red (gules) field. The shield, surrounded by the order of the Golden Fleece and surmounted by a royal crown. These arms are those of the Duchy of Savoy from which it took its name.

== History ==
It saw combat in Italy, Flanders and most European campaigns. In 1813 it was moved to America and fought in Mexico and in the Viceroyalty of the Río de la Plata. During the First Spanish Republic it was renamed 6th Infantry Regiment.
