= Roux, Belgium =

Roux El Rou-dlé-Tchålerwè (Walloon)
- Former municipality of Belgium
- Location in the municipality of Charleroi

- Location in Belgium
- Coordinates: 50°26′N 4°23′E
- Country: Belgium
- Region: Wallonia
- Community: French Community
- Province: Hainaut
- Municipality: Charleroi

Area
  - Total: 2.11 sq mi (5.46 km^{2})

Population (2001)
  - Total: 9,182
- Time zone: UTC+1 (CET)
  - Summer (DST): UTC+2 (CEST)
- Postal code: 6044
- Area code: 071

Roux ([ru]; Walloon: El Rou-dlé-Tchålerwè) is a town of Wallonia and a district of the municipality of Charleroi, located in the province of Hainaut, Belgium.

It was a municipality of its own before the merger of the municipalities in 1977.

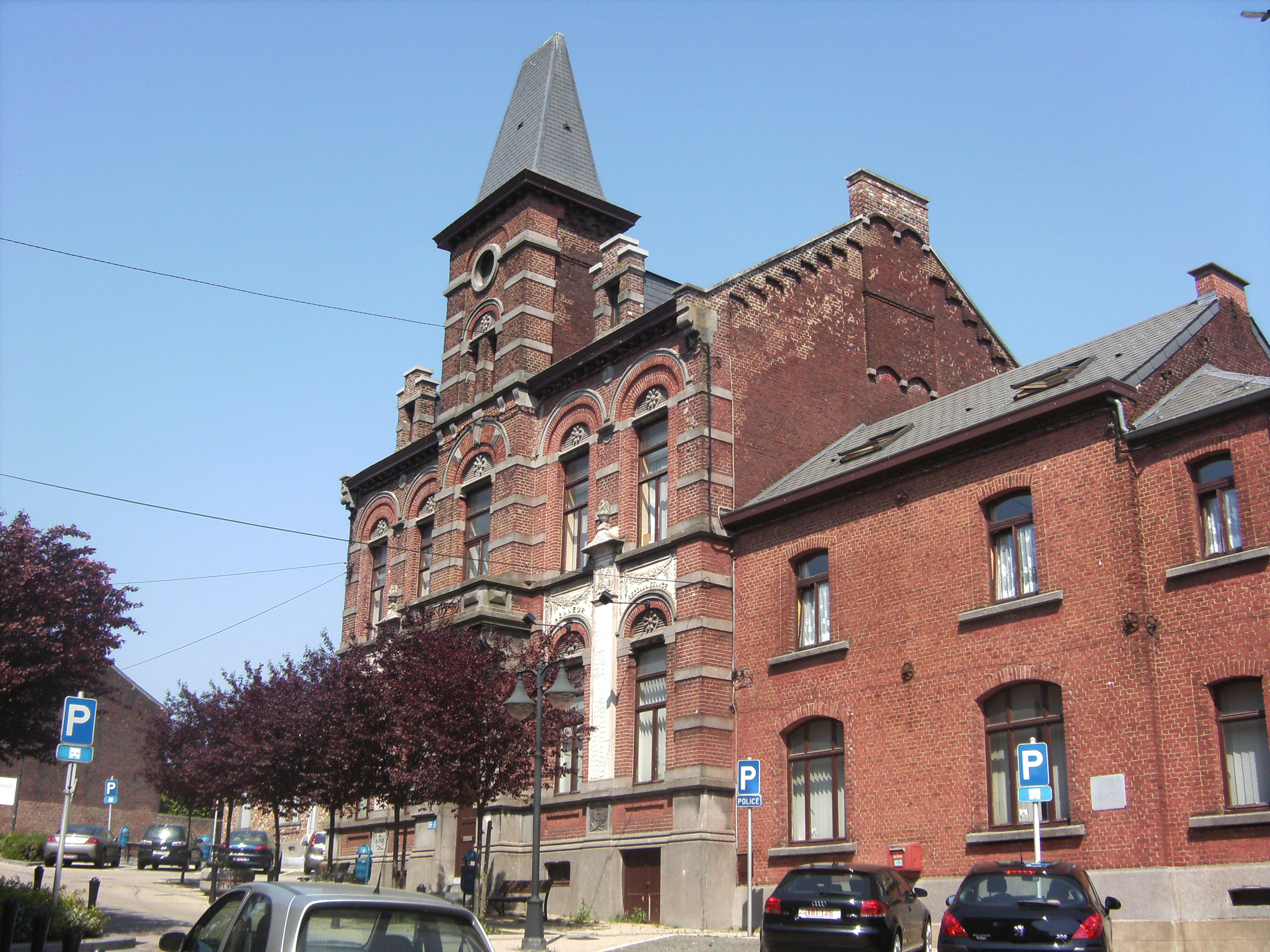
former town hall (1895)
