= Salon of 1838 =

1838 art exhibition in Paris

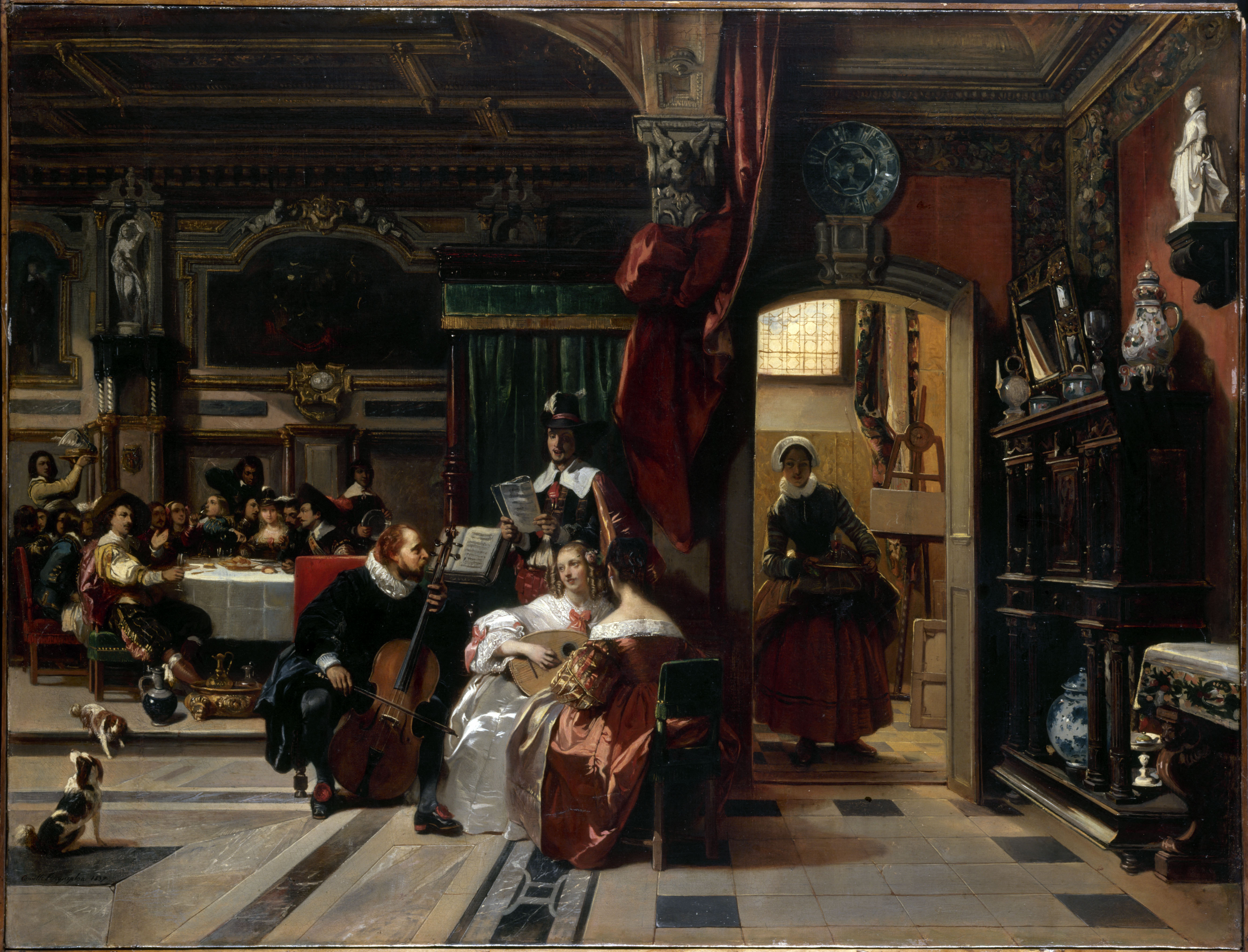
Van Dyck in London by Camille Roqueplan

The Salon of 1838 was an art exhibition held at the Louvre in Paris from 1 March 1838. It took place around midway through the July Monarchy era.

The previous year the Museum of French History had been opened at the Palace of Versailles and works commissioned for it by the state continued to exhibited. These included large-scale paintings to hang in the Galerie des Batailles such as The Storming of Valenciennes by Jean Alaux and The Capitulation of Antwerp by Henri Félix Emmanuel Philippoteaux.

Romantic art continued to feature heavily, led by key figures like Eugène Delacroix who displayed by Medea and The Kaïd, A Moroccan Chief. Camille Roqueplan's Van Dyck in London depicted a scene from the life of the Old Master.

After his disappointing reception at the Salon of 1837, Jean-Baptiste Camille Corot displayed three works: the landscapes Volterra, the Municipality, Toscane and Silenus, the latter of which drew on Greek mythology.

== Gallery ==
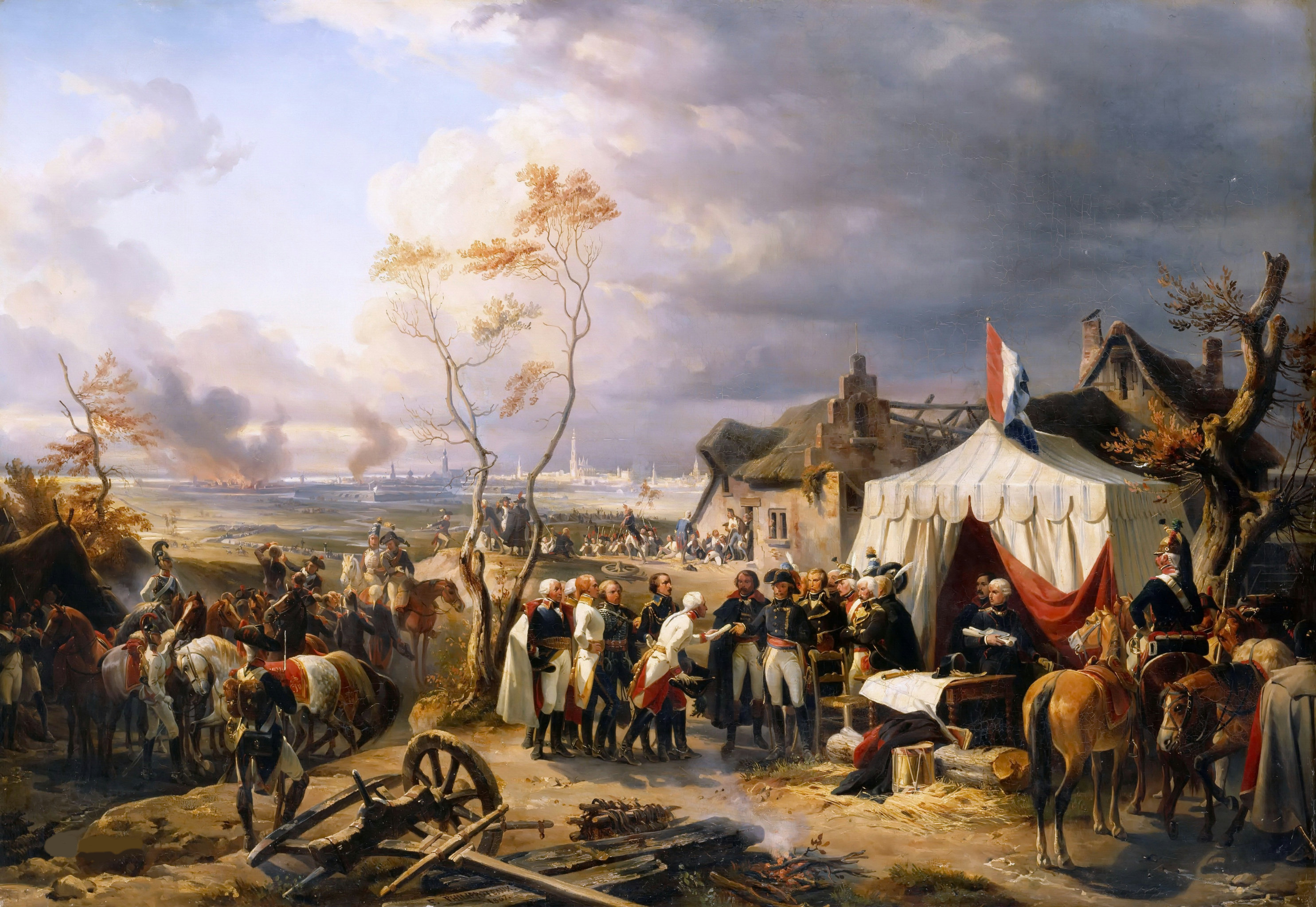
The Capitulation of the Citadel at Antwerp by Henri Félix Emmanuel Philippoteaux

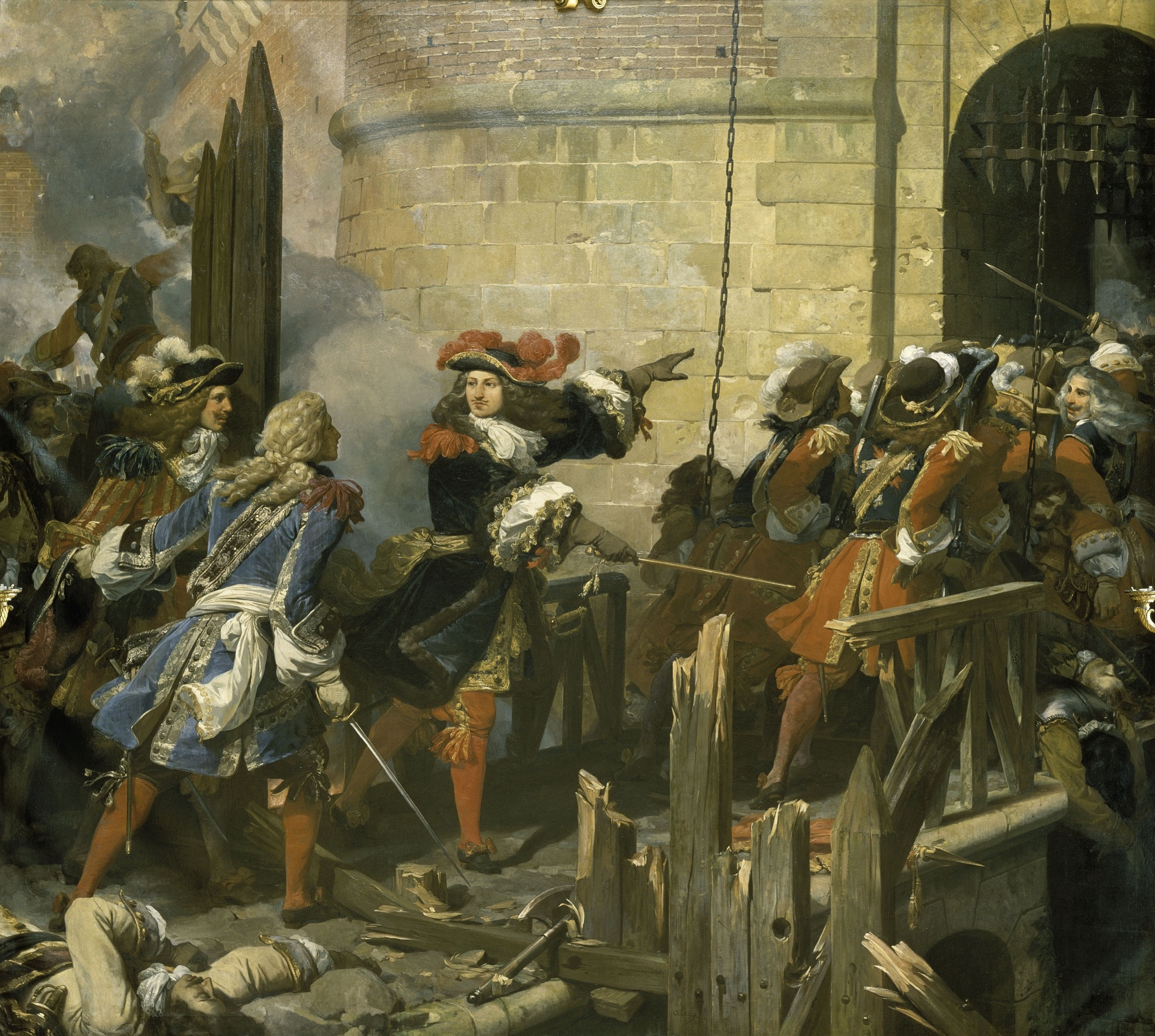
The Storming of Valenciennes by Jean Alaux

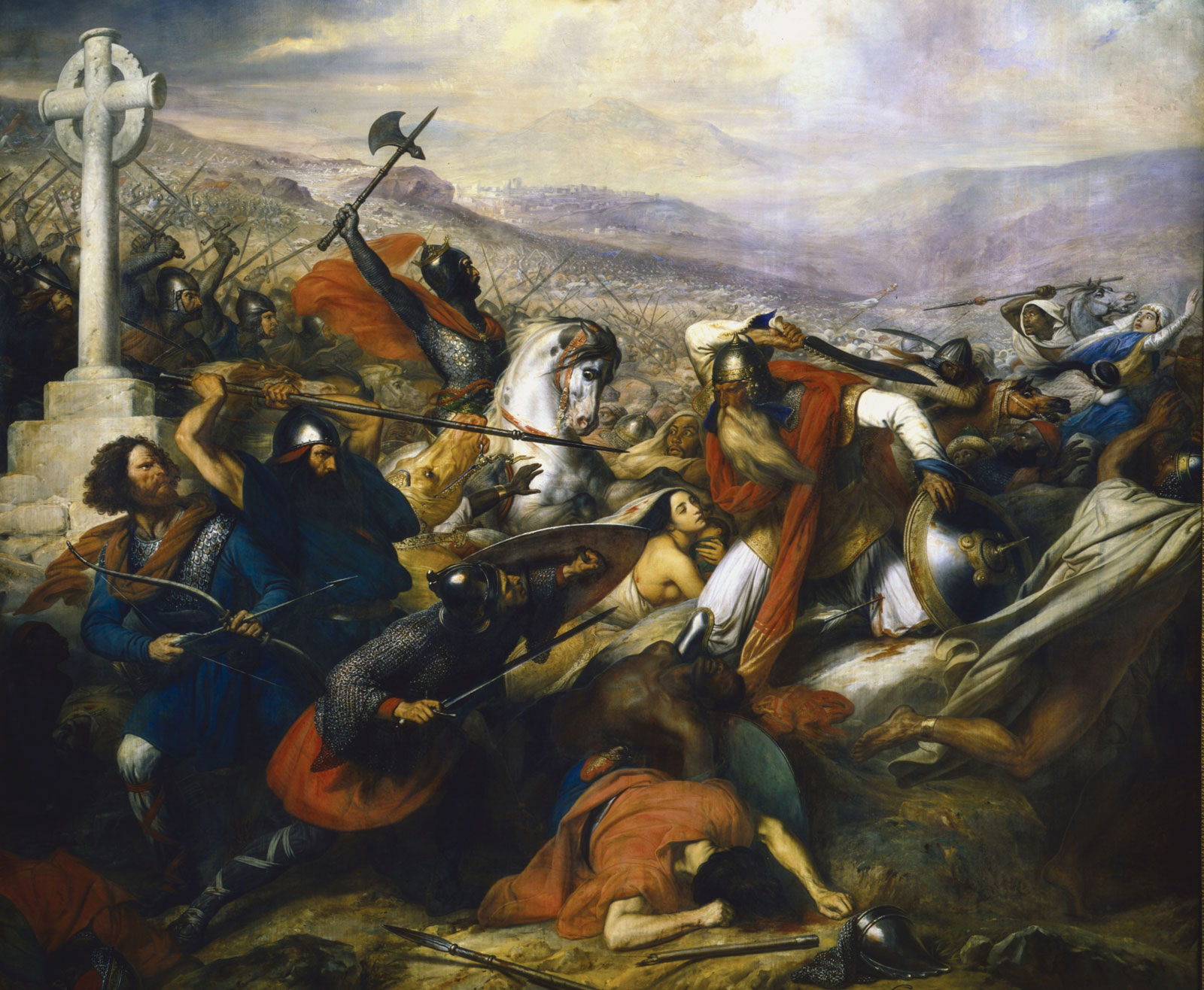
The Battle of Poitiers by Charles de Steuben

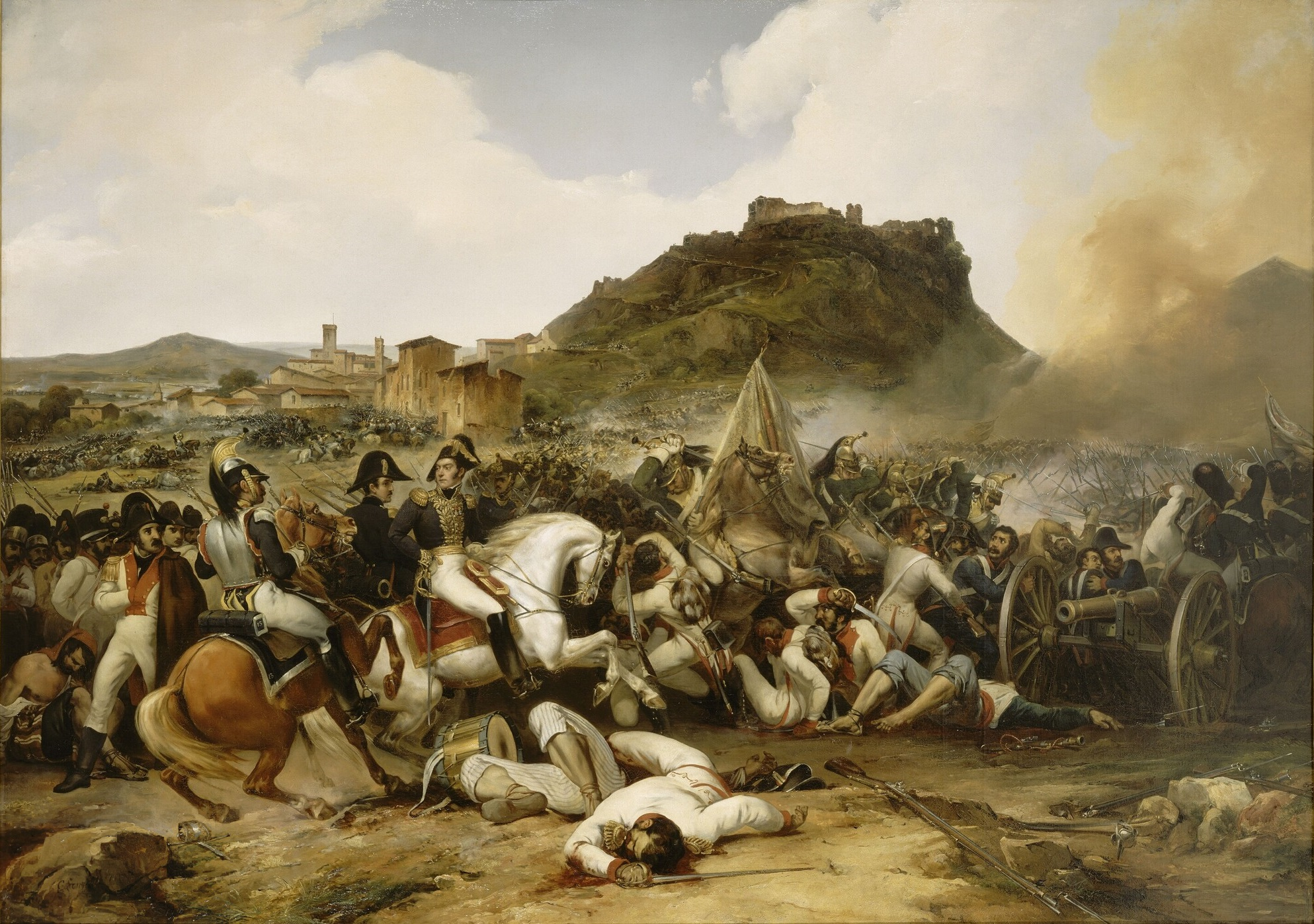
The Battle of Castalla by Jean-Charles Langlois

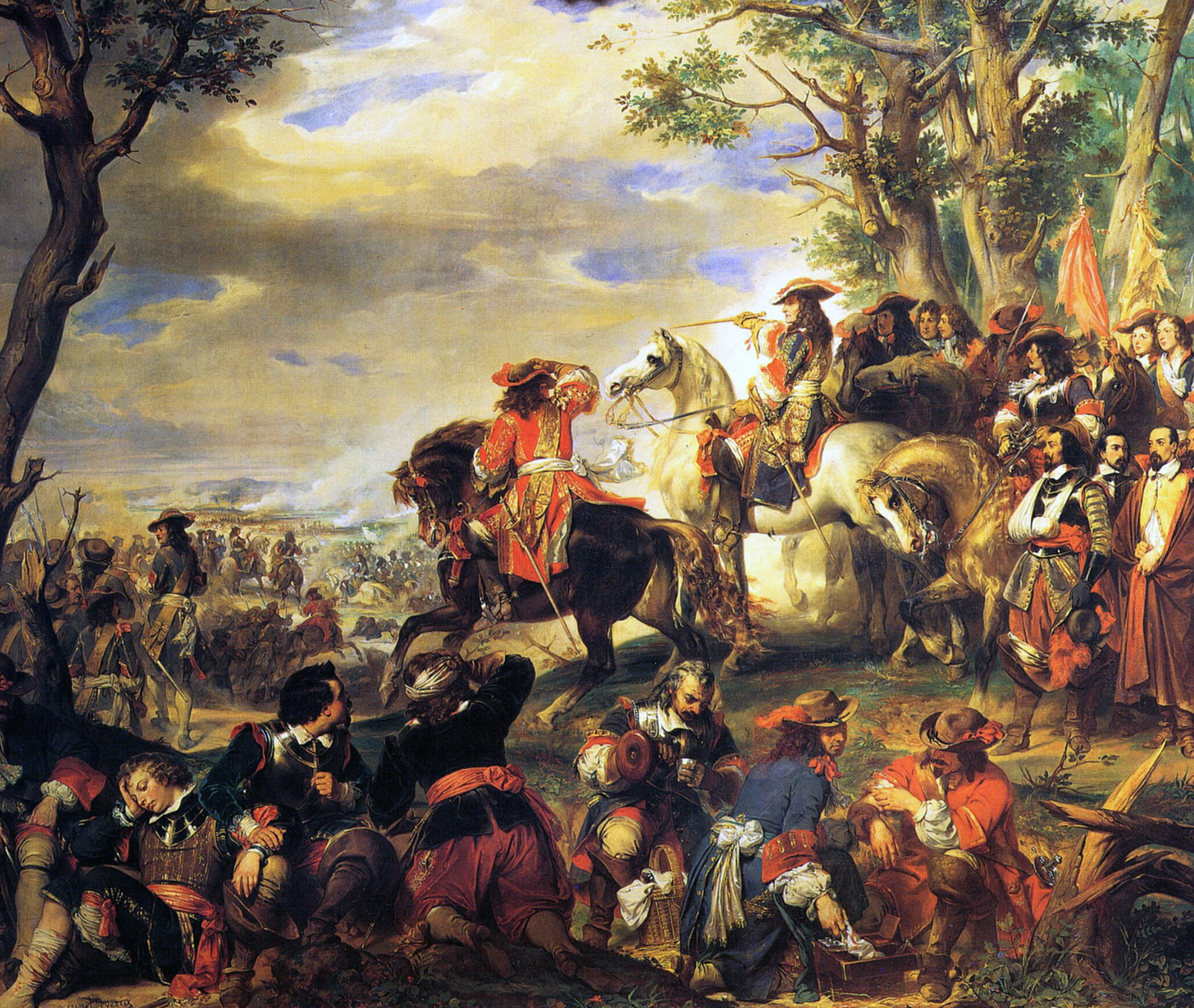
The Battle of Marsaglia by Eugène Devéria

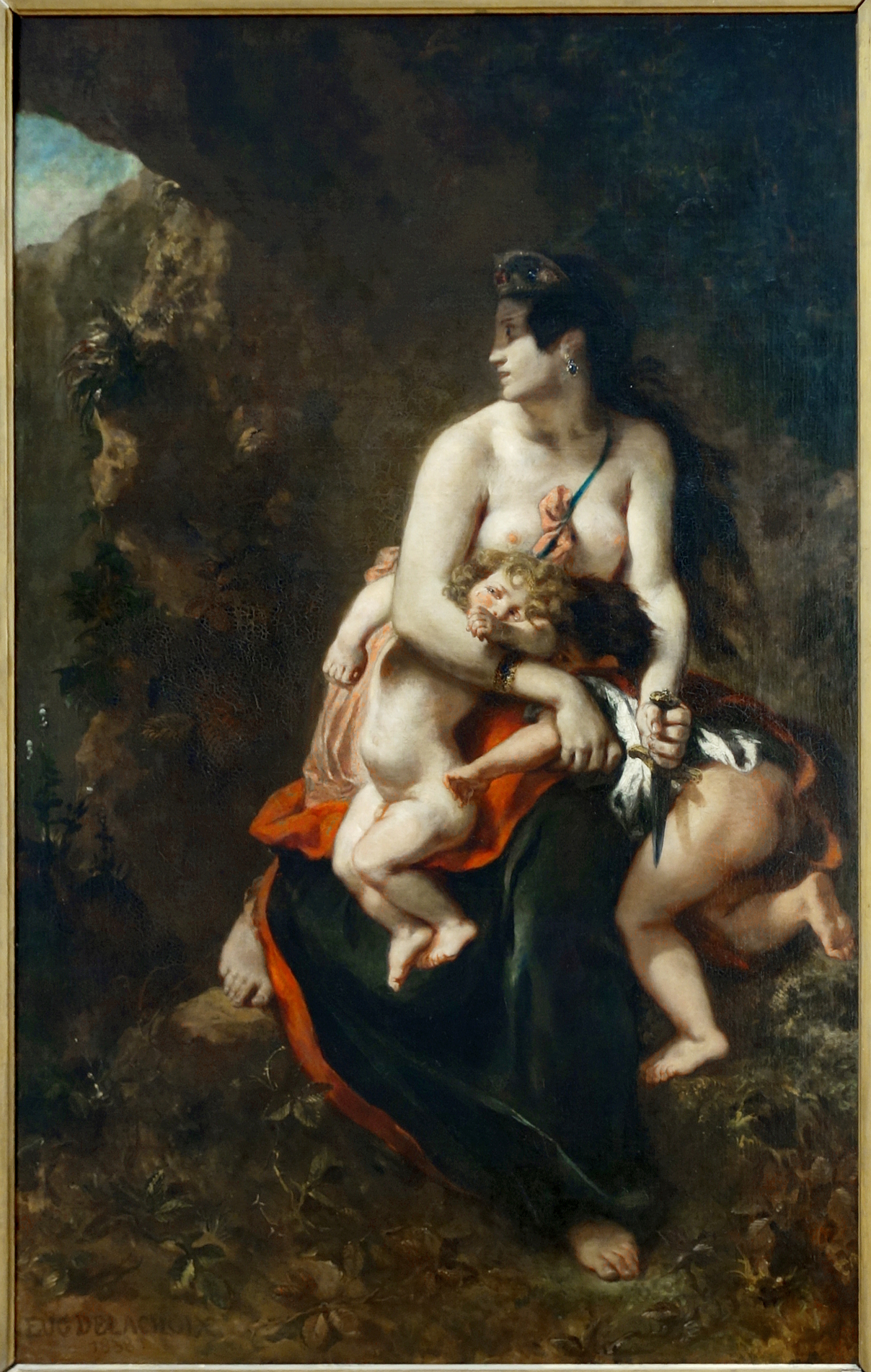
Medea by Eugène Delacroix

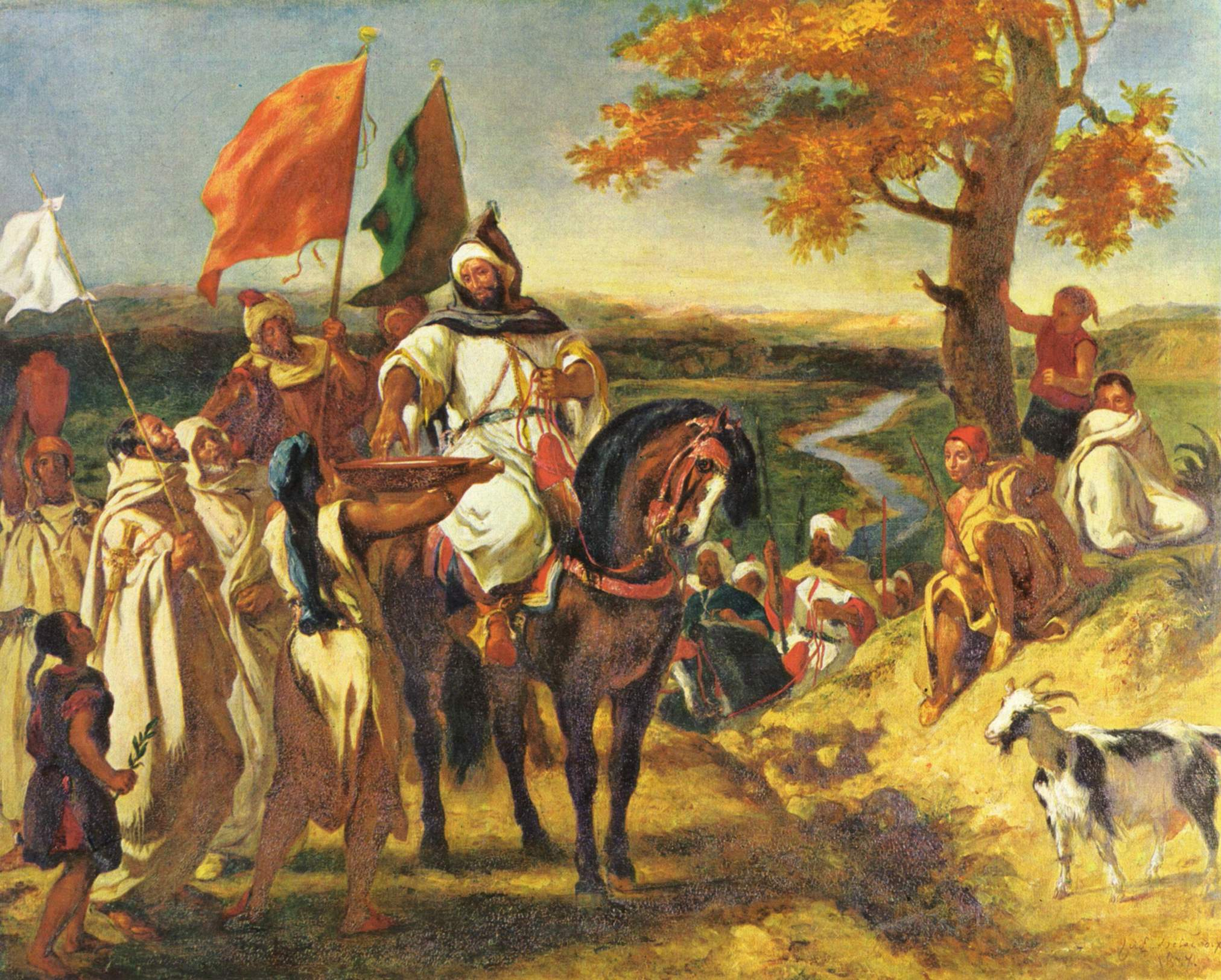
The Kaïd, A Moroccan Chief by Eugène Delacroix

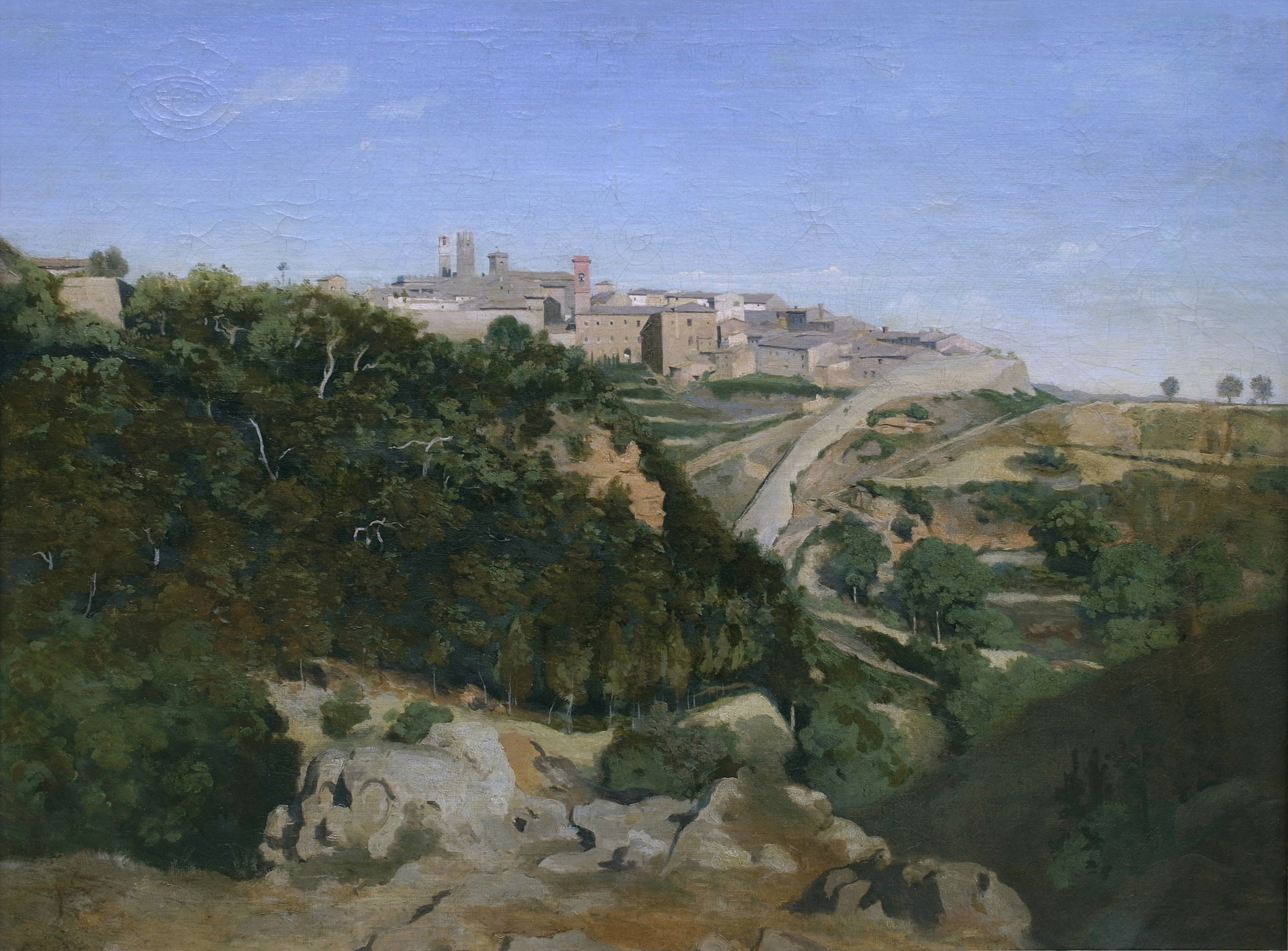
Volterra, the Municipality by Jean-Baptiste-Camille Corot

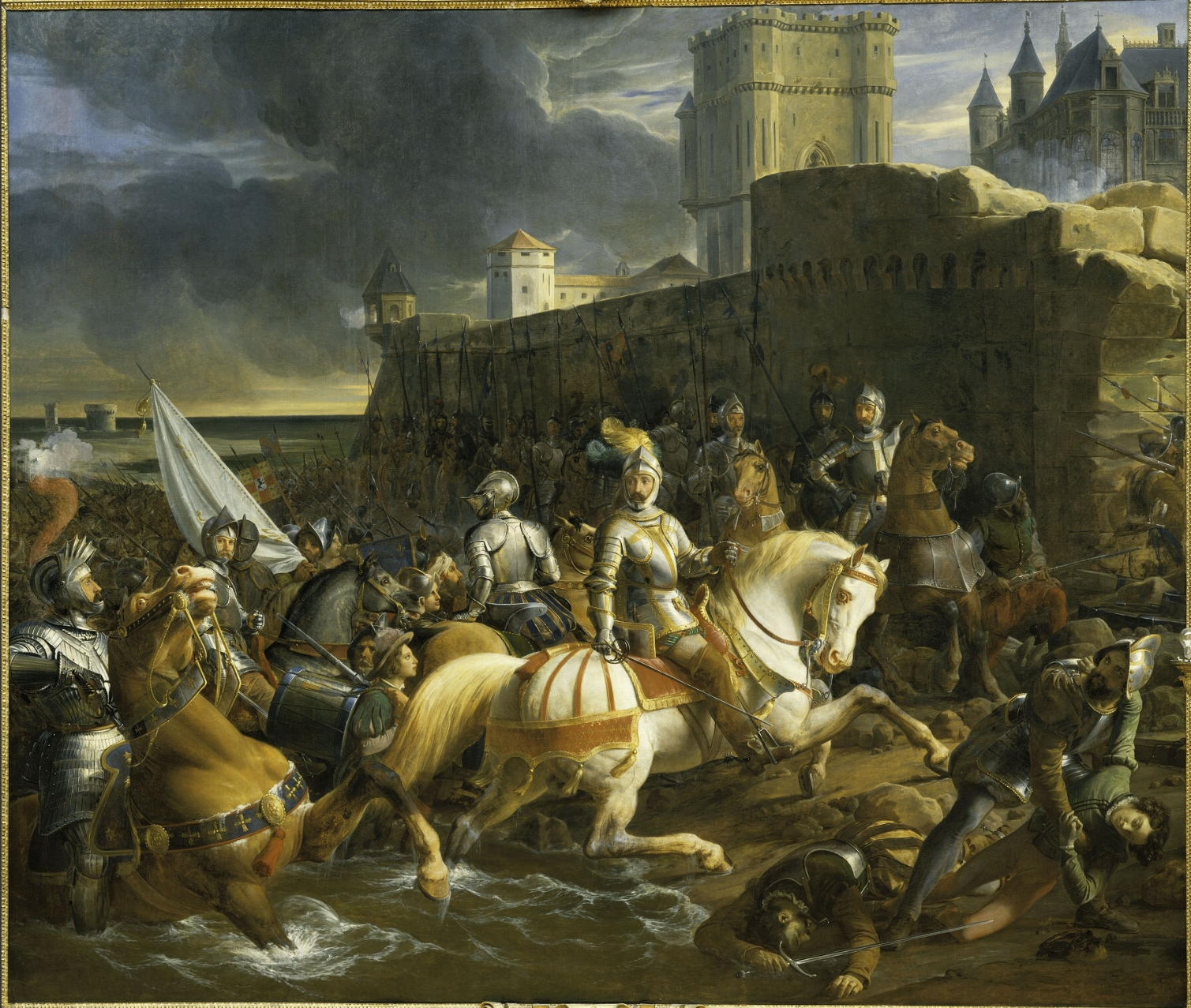
The Siege of Calais by François-Édouard Picot

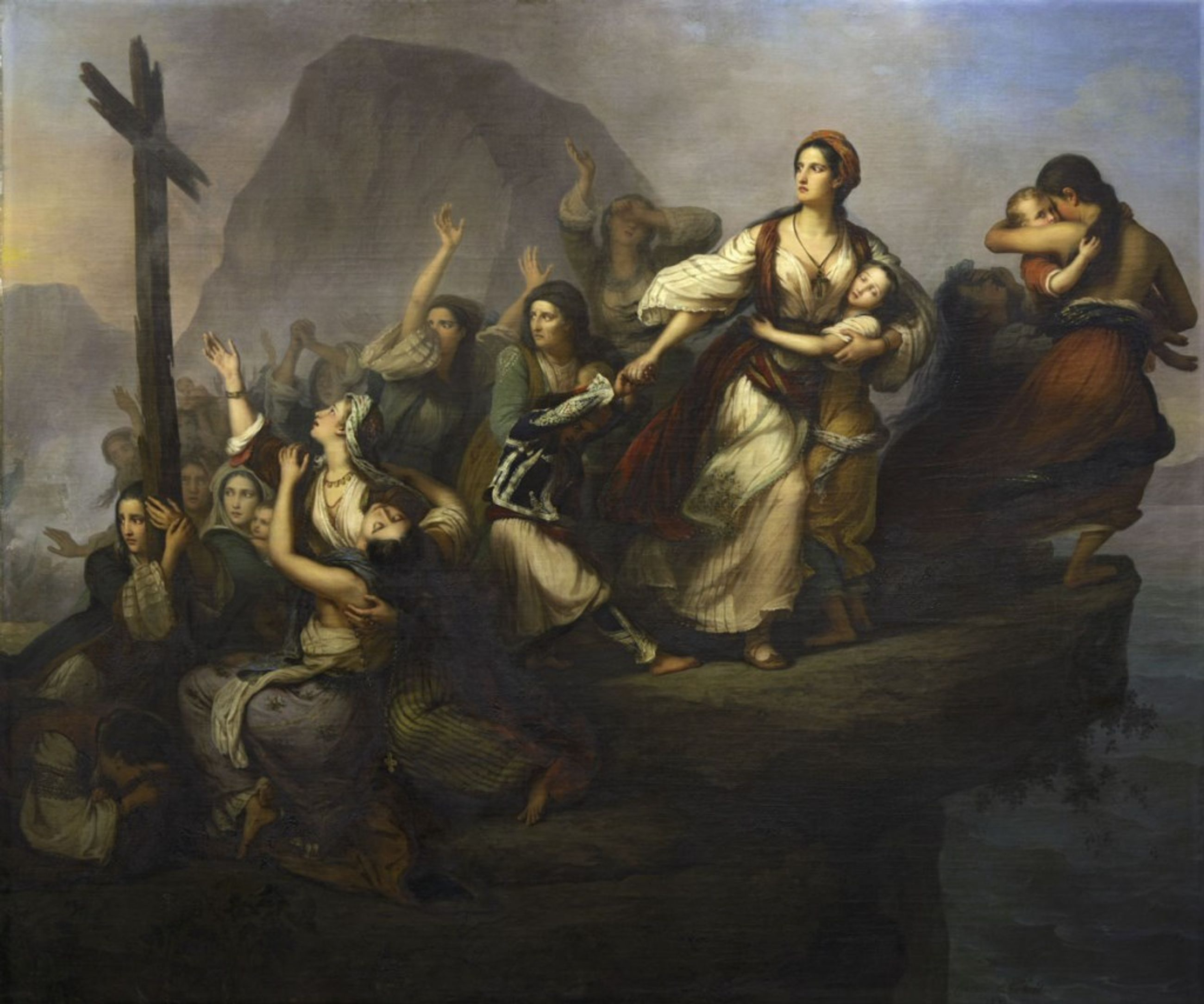
Greek Women of Souli Running to Their Death by Constance Blanchard

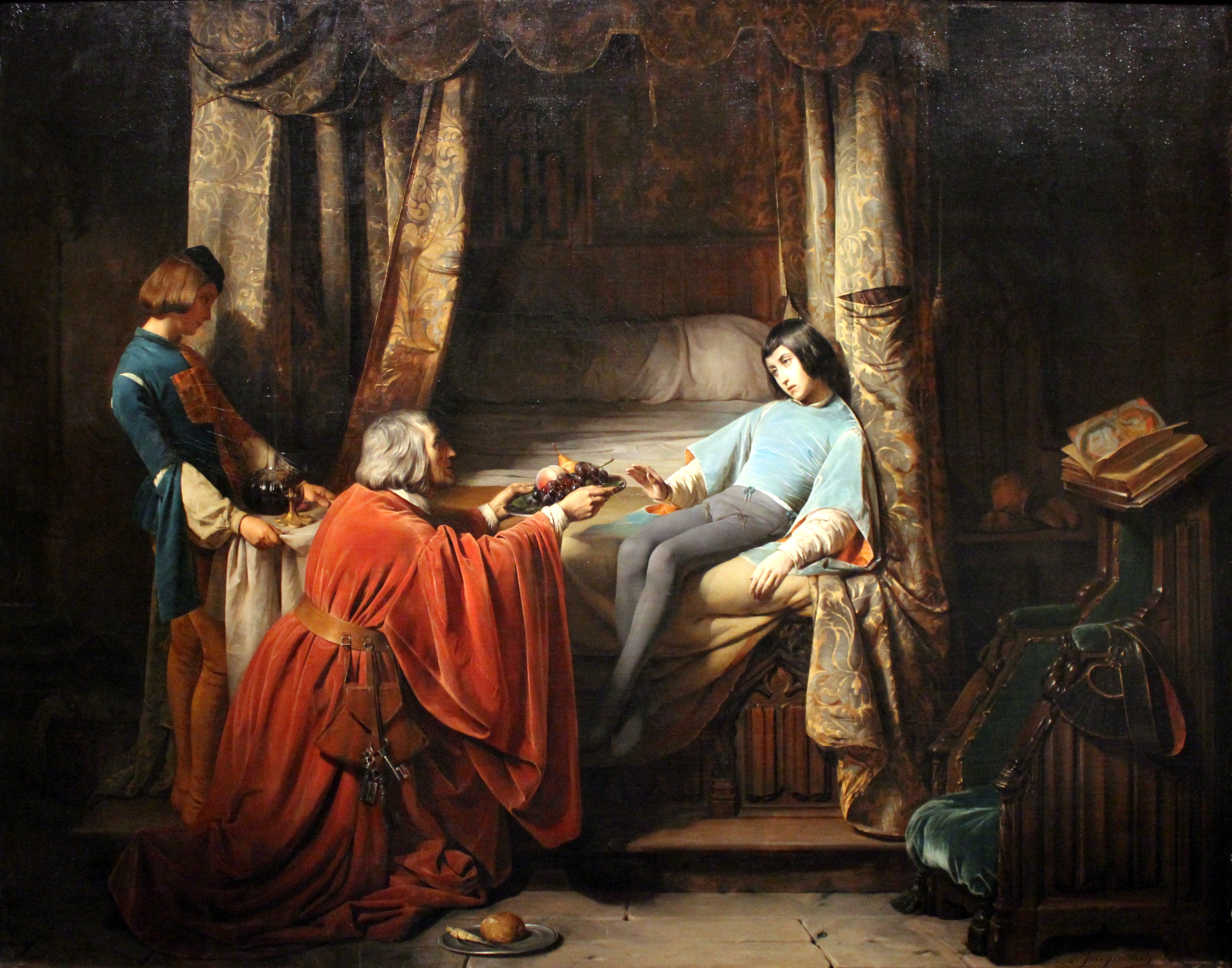
Young Gaston, Known as the Angel of Foix by Claudius Jacquand

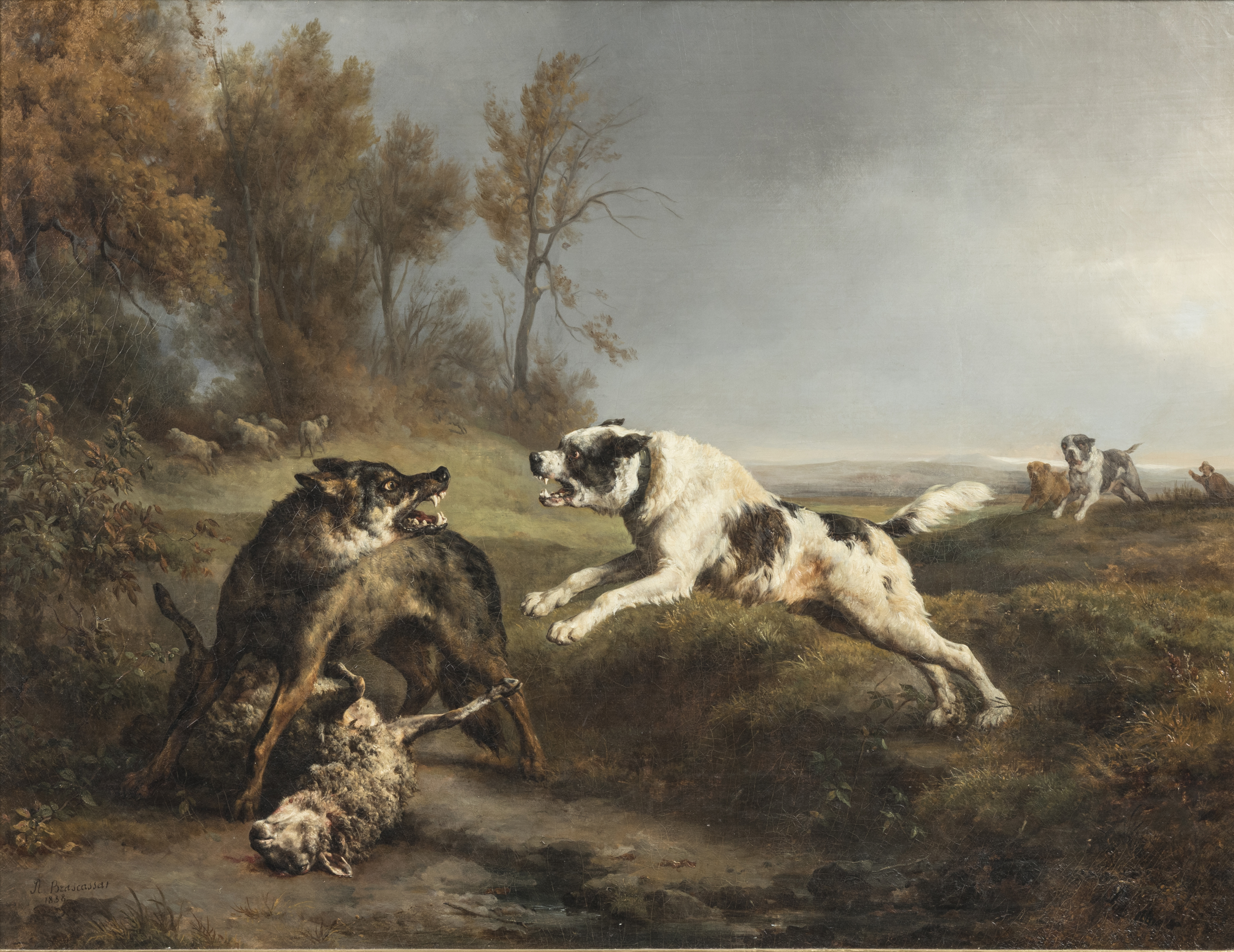
The Wolf by Jacques Raymond Brascassat

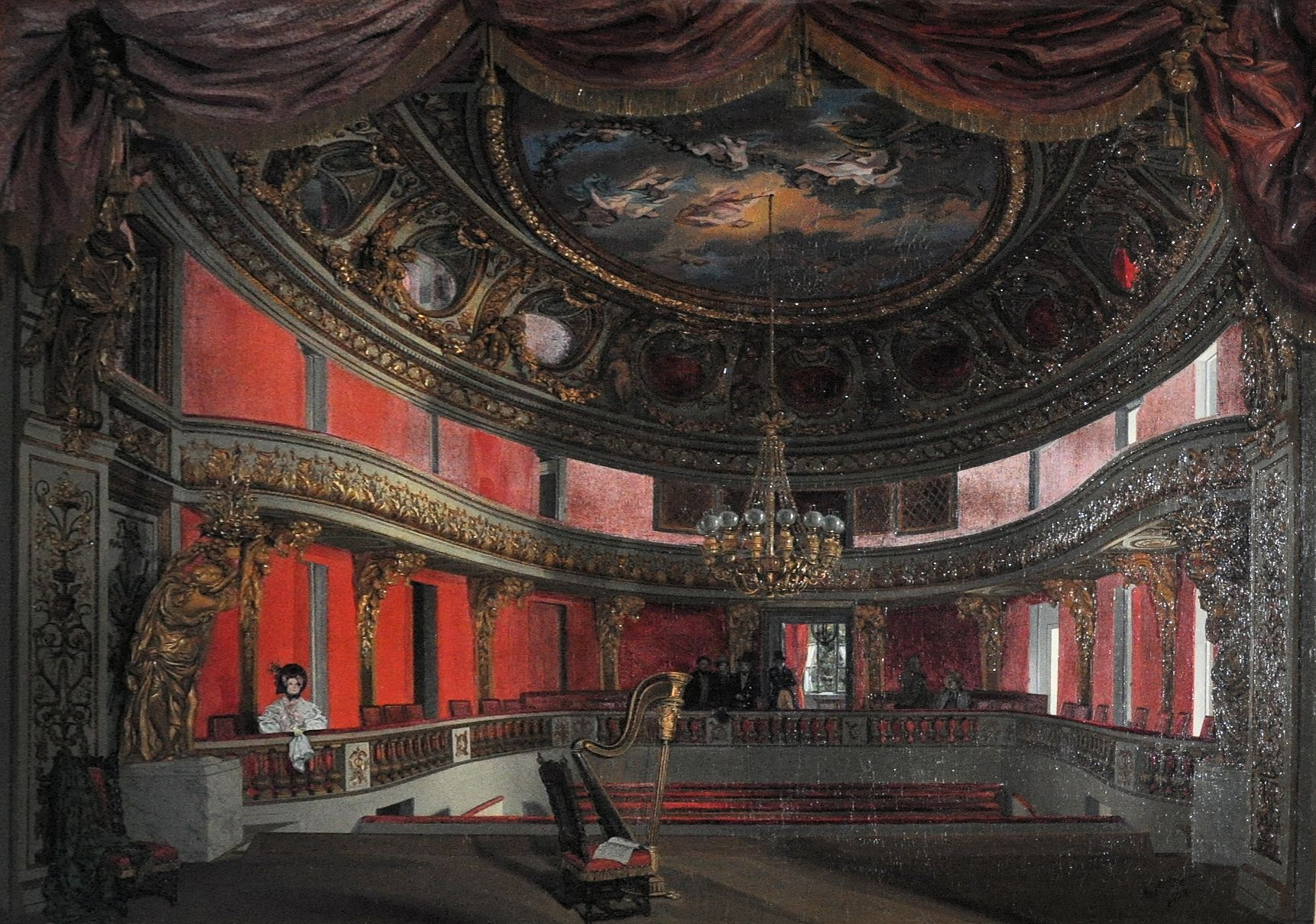
Théâtre de Marie-Antoinette en 1838 by Antoinette Asselineau

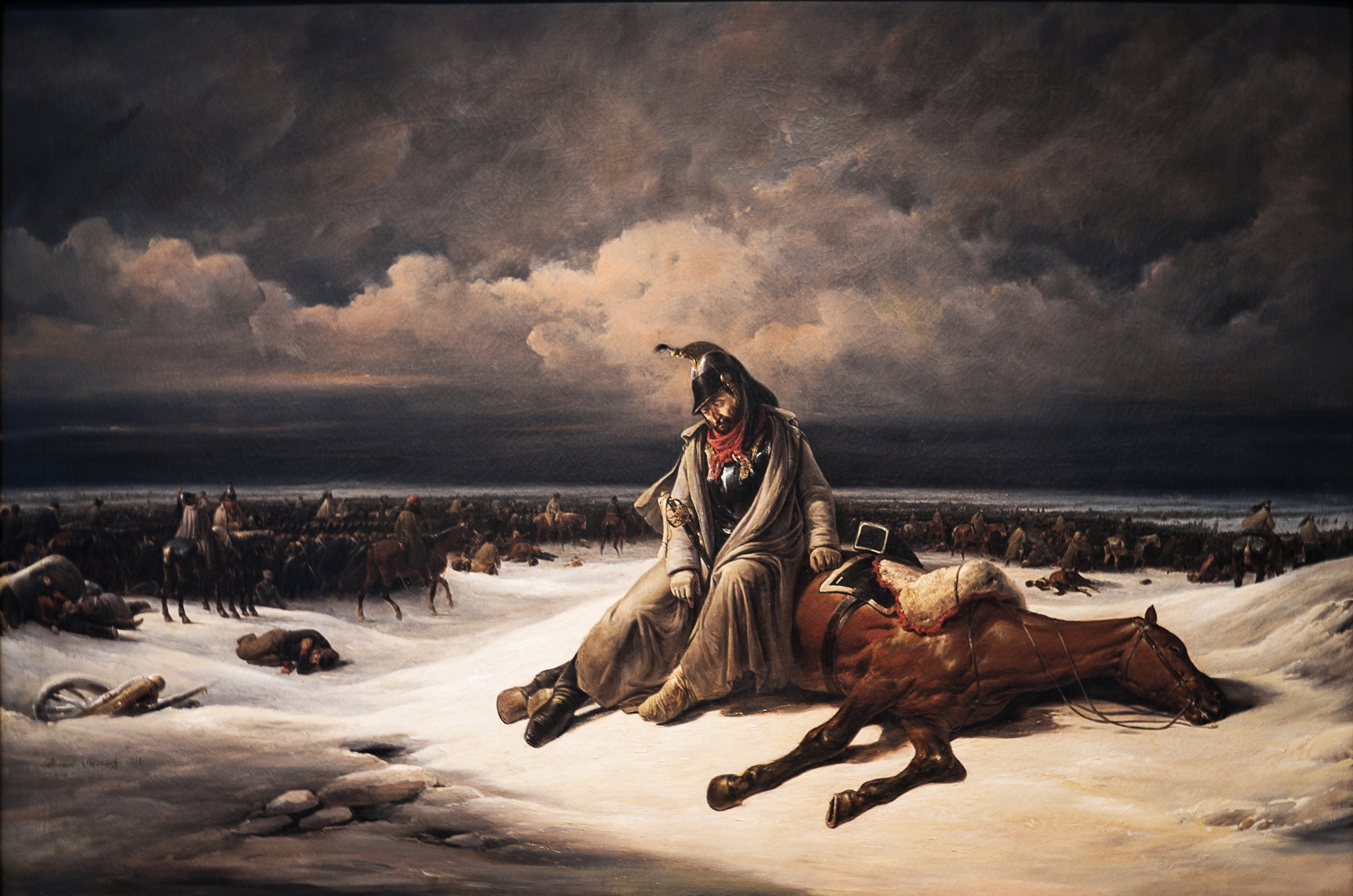
The Retreat from Russia by Bernard-Édouard Swebach

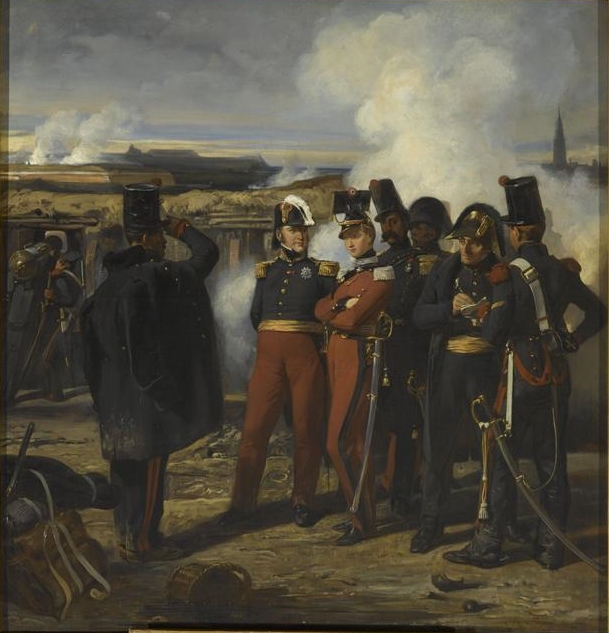
The Duke of Nemours and Marshal Gérard at the Siege of Antwerp by Amédée Faure

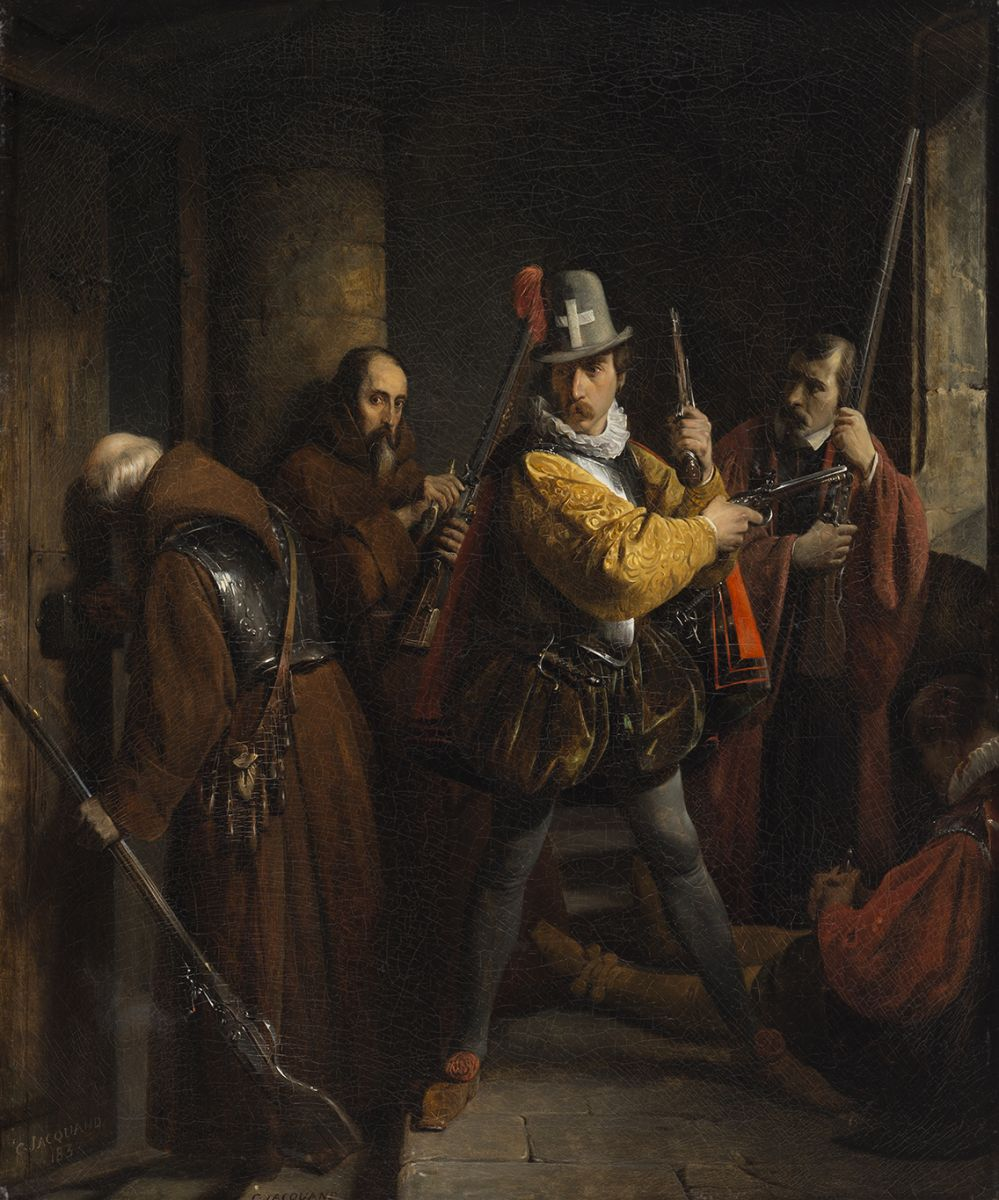
The Night of Saint Bartholomew, 1572 by Claudius Jacquand

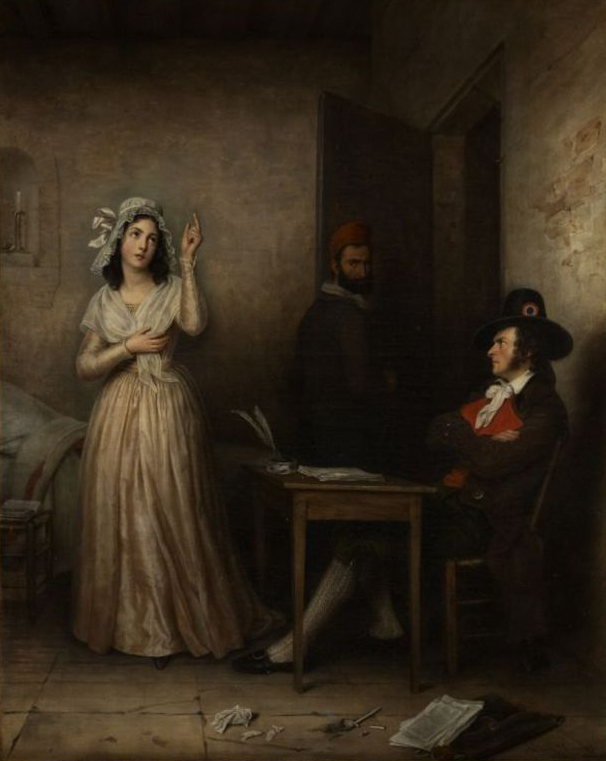
Charlotte Corday in Prison by Melina Thomas

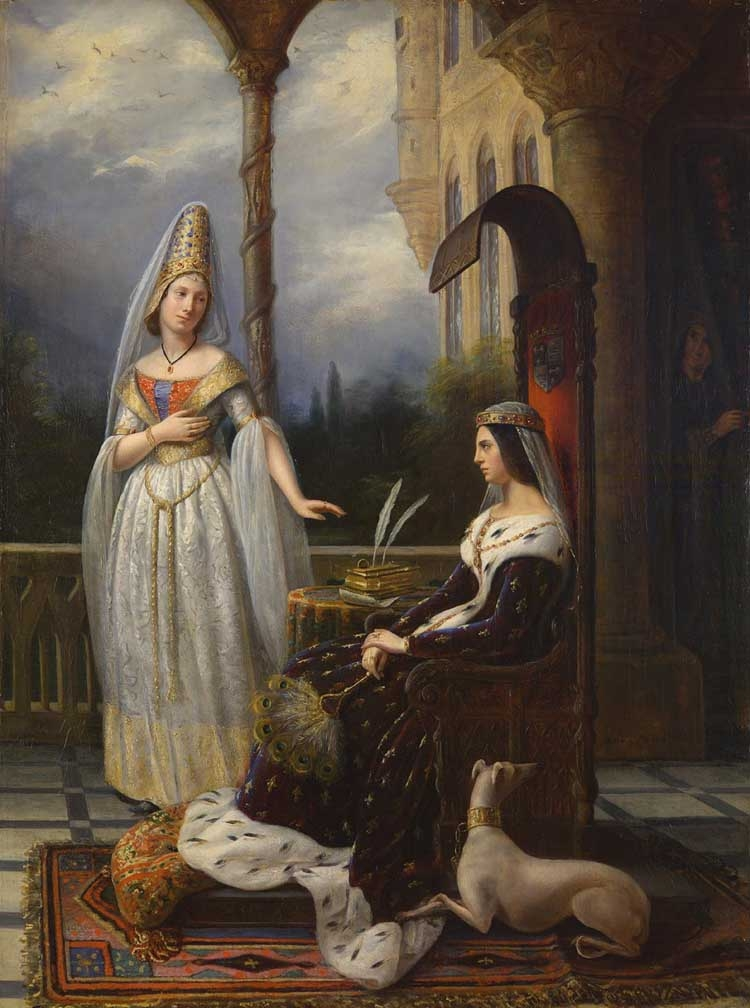
Valentine of Milan and Odette de Champdivers by Anna Rimbaut-Borrel

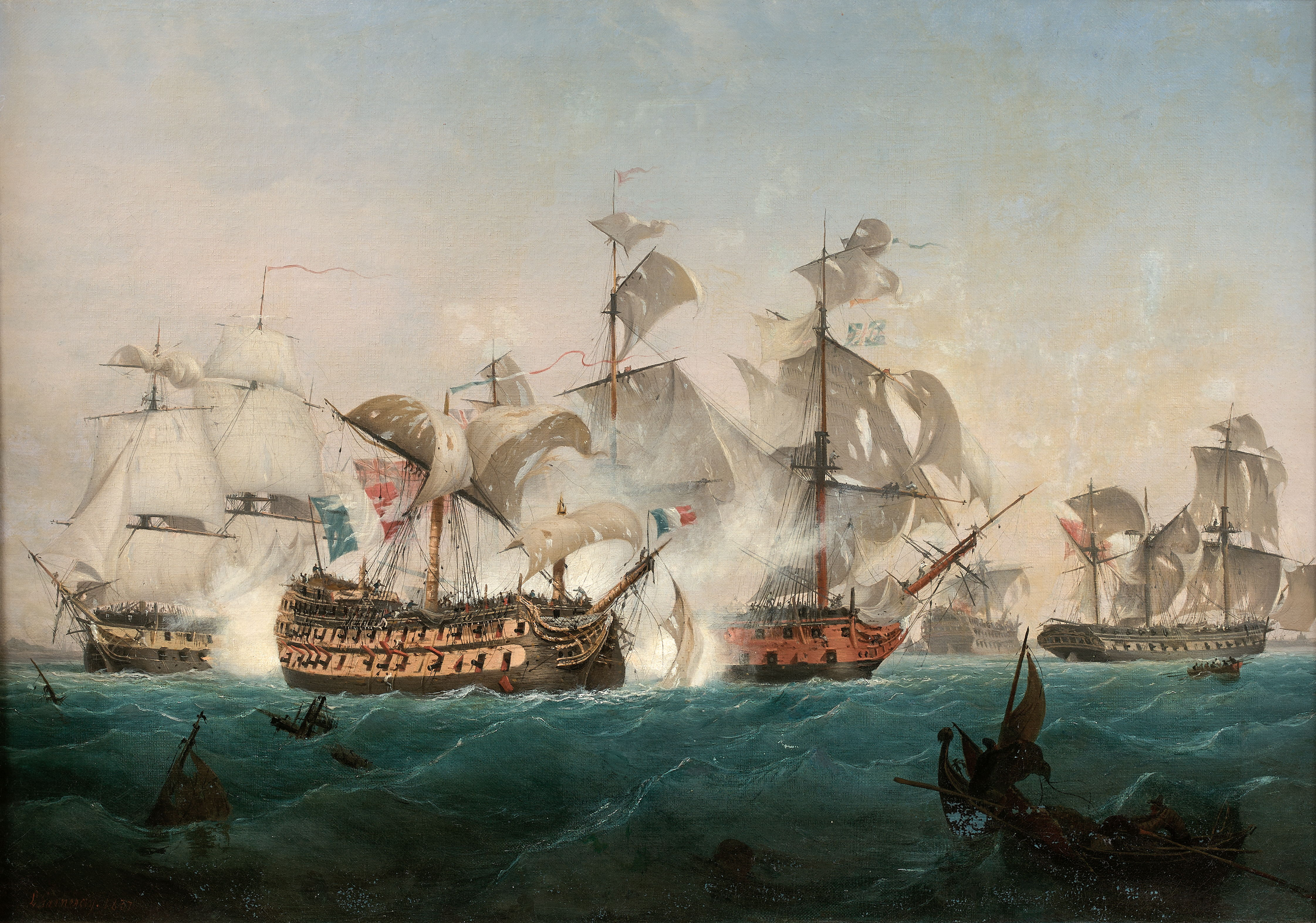
Le vaisseau le Vengeur by Ambroise Louis Garneray

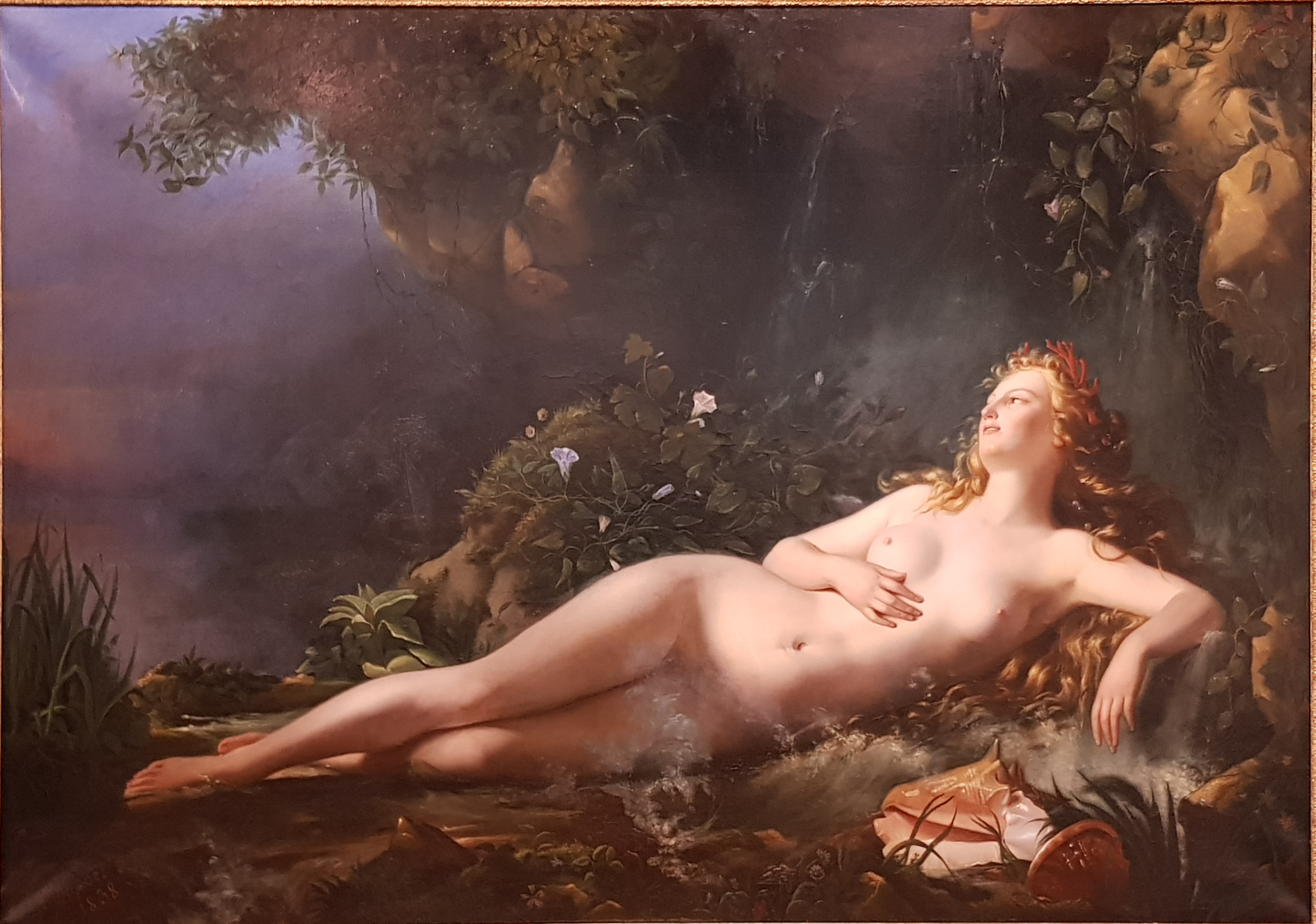
Ondine by Adrienne Duport

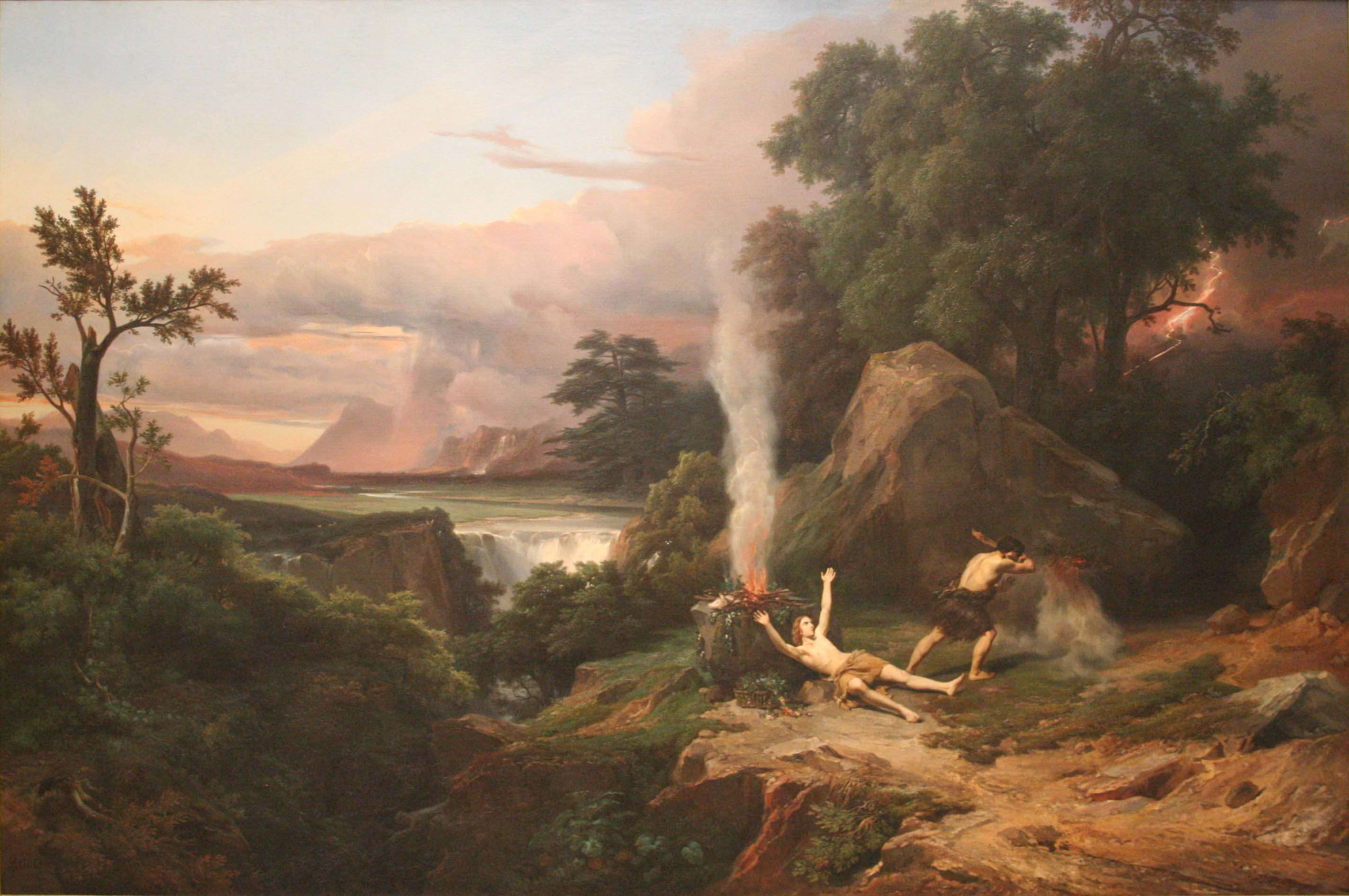
The Death of Abel by Jean-Charles-Joseph Rémond

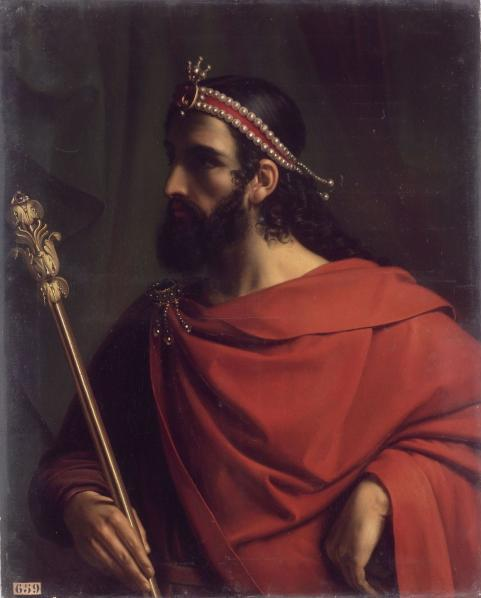
Caribert, King of the Franks by Jean-Joseph Dassy

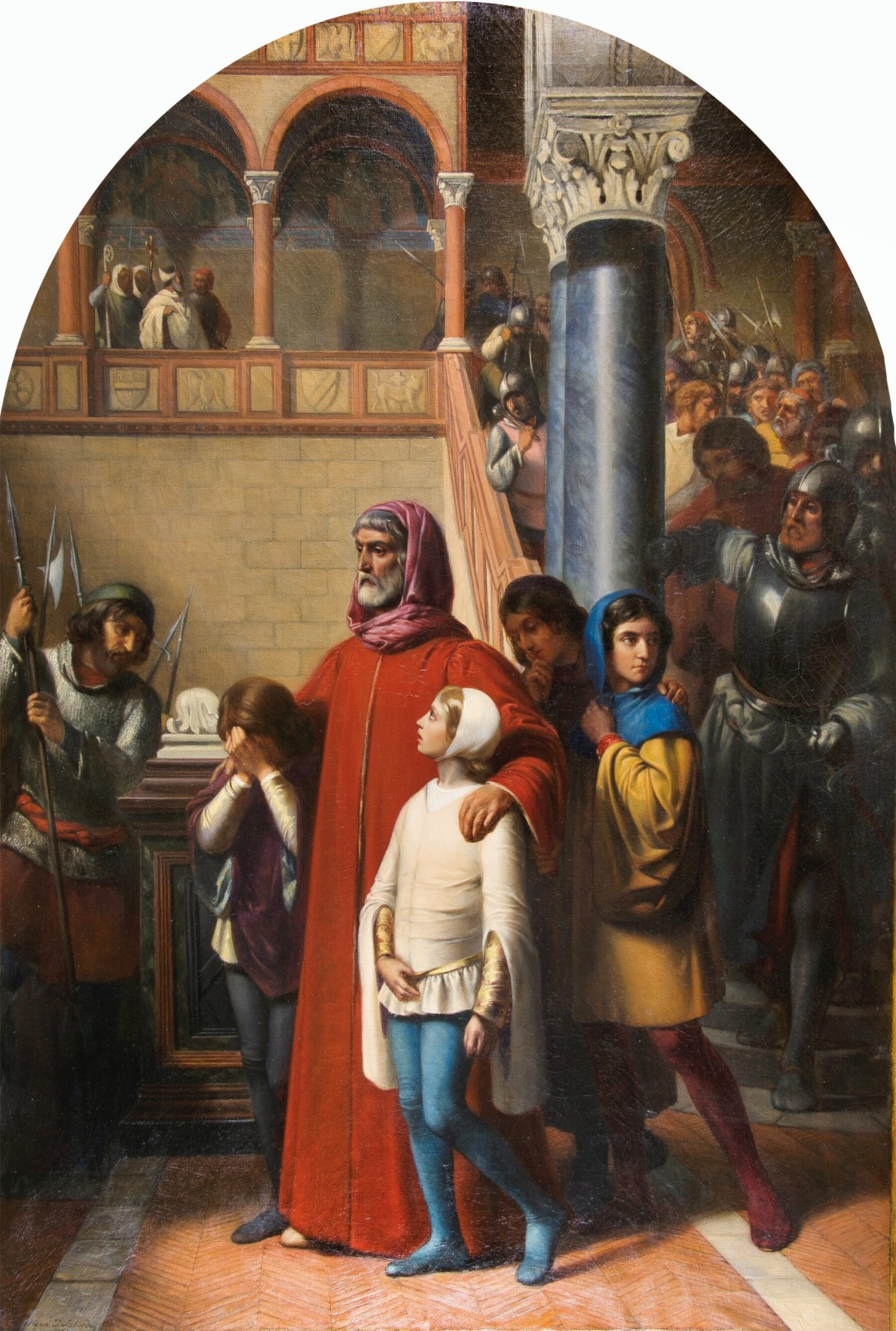
The Arrest of Ugolino by Henri Delaborde

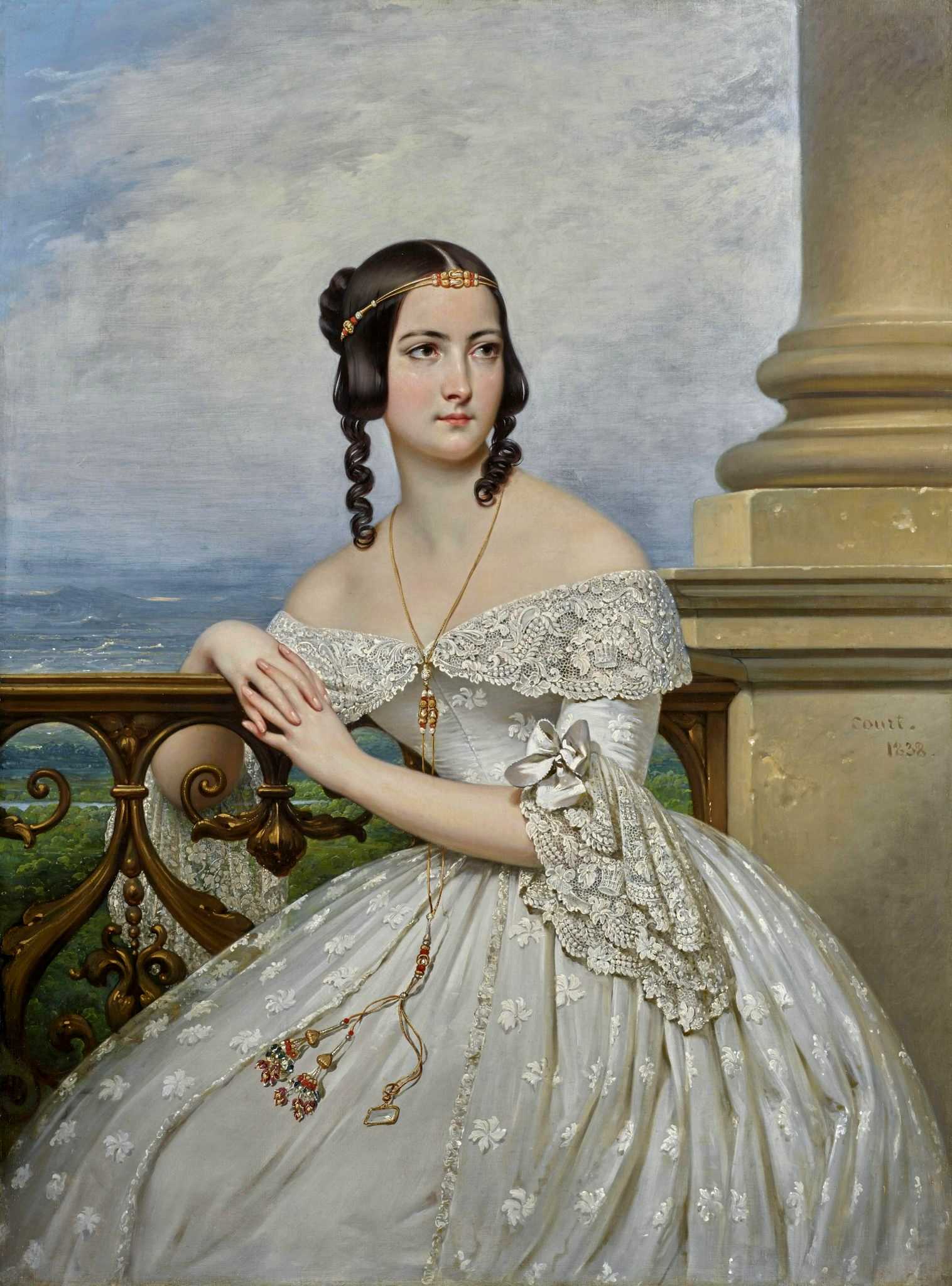
Portrait of Miss White by Joseph-Désiré Court

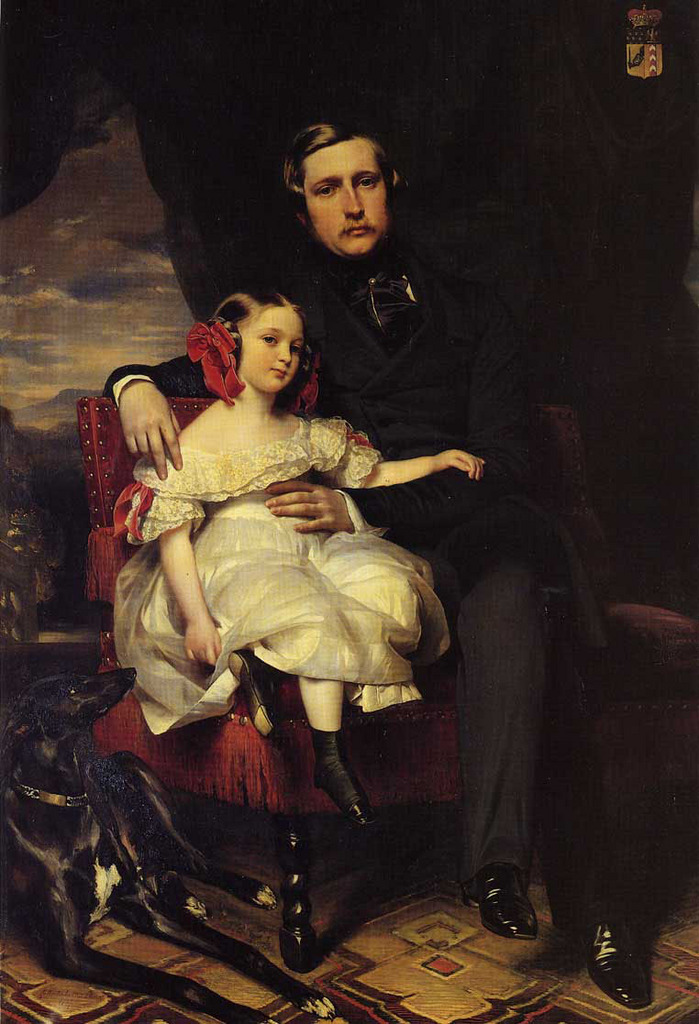
Portrait of the Prince of Wagram and His Daughter Malcy by Franz Xaver Winterhalter

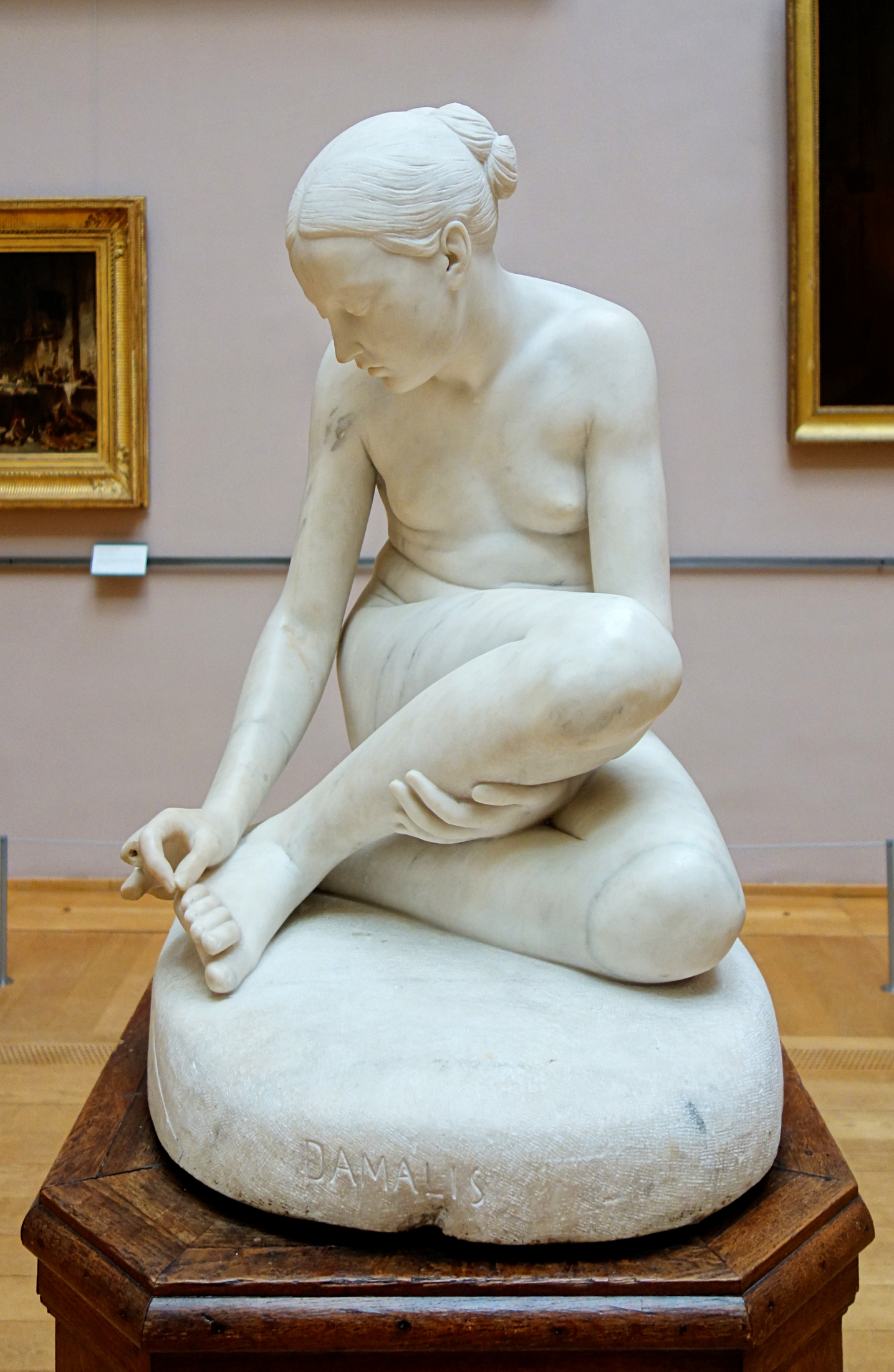
Damaris by Antoine Étex

== See also ==
- Category:Artworks exhibited at the Salon of 1838
- Royal Academy Exhibition of 1838, held at the National Gallery in London

== Bibliography ==
- Allard, Sébastien & Fabre, Côme. Delacroix. Metropolitan Museum of Art, 2018.
- Boime, Albert. Art in an Age of Counterrevolution, 1815-1848. University of Chicago Press, 2004.
- Hornstein, Katie. Picturing War in France, 1792–1856. Yale University Press, 2018.
- Tinterow, Gary, Pantazzi, Michael & Pomarède, Vincent. Corot. Metropolitan Museum of Art, 1996
