= Antoinette Asselineau =

French painter

- Born: May 15, 1811; Hamburg, Germany
- Died: January 1, 1889; Rouen, France
- Occupation: Painter

Antoinette Asselineau (May 15, 1811 – January 1, 1889) was a French painter born in Hamburg, Germany.

== Biography ==
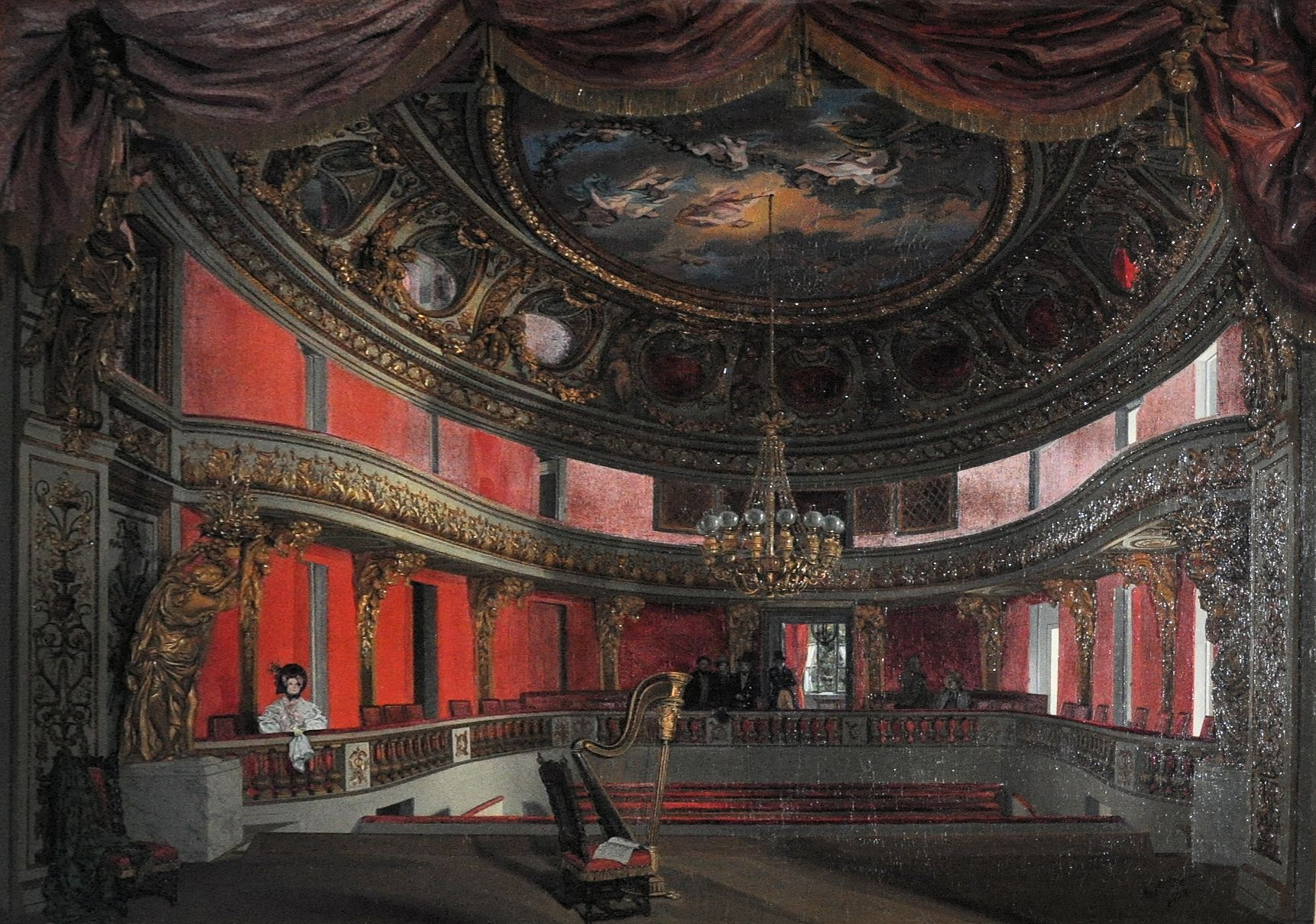
Interior of the Queen's theatre in the Petit Trianon, 1838, Versailles

A portrait and scenic painter, Asselineau was the sister of the painter and lithographer Léon Auguste Asselineau.

== Collections ==
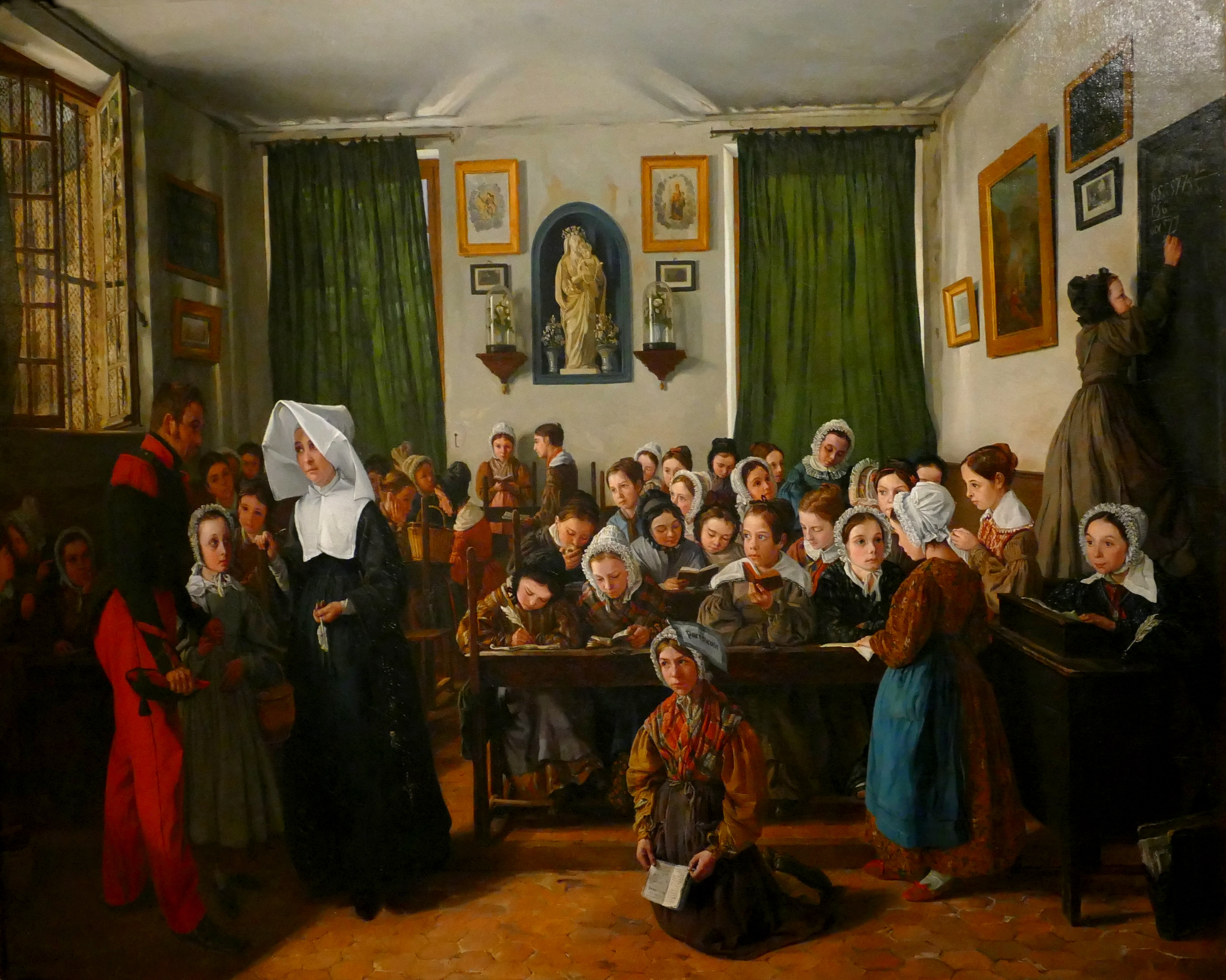
A Christian school at Versailles, 1839, musée national de l'Éducation

- Town hall of Bayon, France, Le roi Louis-Philippe, 1842, oil on canvas
- musée national du château de Fontainebleau
- Rouen, Musée national de l'Éducation
- Versailles, musée national des châteaux de Versailles et de Trianon : L'intérieur du théâtre de la reine au Petit Trianon en 1838, Salon of 1838, oil on canvas.
