= Lazare Bruandet =

French landscape painter

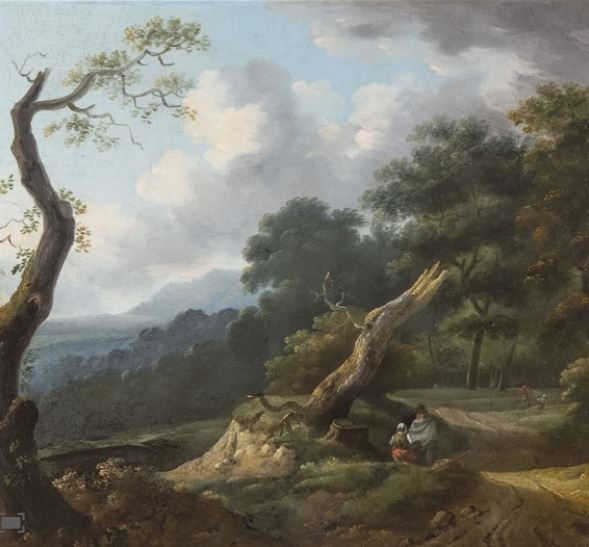
Panoramic Landscape

Lazare Bruandet (3 July 1755 – 26 March 1804) was a French painter and engraver.

== Biography ==
Little is known about his career. He was born in Paris and began as the student of a wash painter named Jean-Philippe Sarrazin (d.1795). His later training, acquired in Germany, inclined him toward traditional, realistic landscapes. Upon returning to France, his style developed by painting outdoors (en plein aire, as it came to be known) in the forests surrounding Paris. He was often accompanied by his fellow landscape painters, Georges Michel and Jacques François Joseph Swebach-Desfontaines, who occasionally created the small figures in his works.

In 1787, after coming home from a hunt, King Louis XVI was asked what sort of game he encountered. His response was: "I only met wild boars and Bruandet". He was, in fact, said to be a difficult, argumentative person, and a staunch supporter of the Revolution.

He was married to Catherine Linger and lived at several Paris addresses, until his final years, which were spent at the Saint-Honoré Cloister; presumably for being penurious. Not long before his death, his uncle is said to have acquired five of his paintings for 500 Francs.
