= The Capitulation of the Citadel at Antwerp =

Painting by Henri Félix Emmanuel Philippoteaux

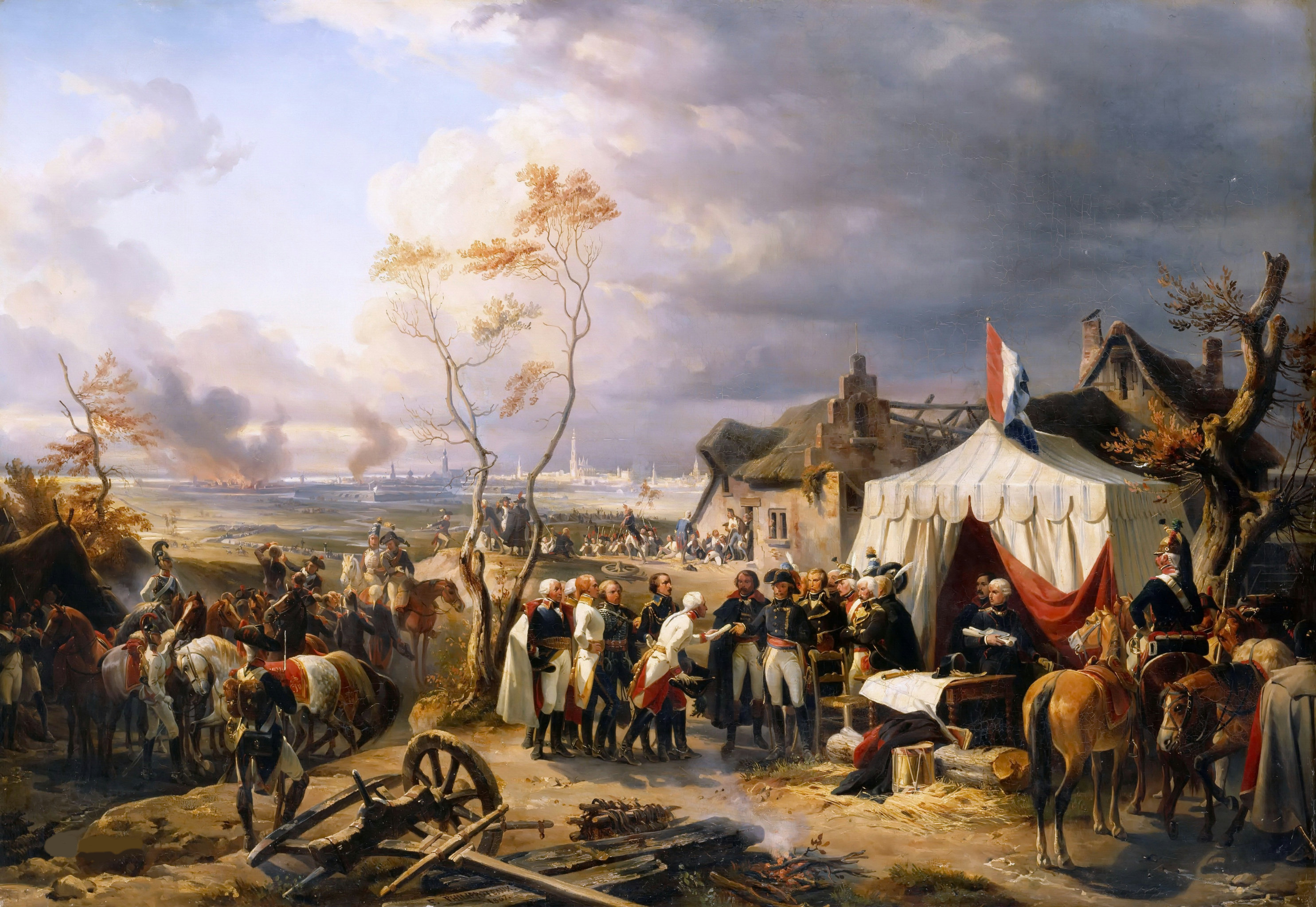
- Artist: Henri Félix Emmanuel Philippoteaux
- Year: 1837
- Type: Oil on canvas, history painting
- Dimensions: 113 cm × 166 cm (44 in × 65 in)
- Location: Palace of Versailles, Versailles

The Capitulation of the Citadel at Antwerp (French: Capitulation de la Cidaelle D'Anvers) is an oil on canvas history painting by the French artist Henri Félix Emmanuel Philippoteaux, from 1837.

== History and description ==
It features a scene from the Siege of Antwerp on 29 November 1792 during the French Revolutionary Wars. In a tent by a farmhouse outside the city of Antwerp, the Austrian commanders are shown surrendering to the veteran French general Alexis Magallon de la Morlière. The Antwerp Citadel was a significant fortification inside the city, which now passed into the control of the French Republic.

The painting was commissioned by Louis Philippe I as part of a widespread programme under the July Monarchy to celebrate historic French victories. The picture was displayed at the Salon of 1838 held at the Louvre in Paris. It is now part of the collection of the Museum of French History at the Palace of Versailles, where it hangs in the Galerie des Batailles.

== Bibliography ==
- Cantarel-Besson, Yveline, Constans, Claire & Foucart, Bruno. Napoléon: images et histoire : peintures du Château de Versailles, 1789–1815. Réunion des musées nationaux, 2001.
- Hornstein, Katie. Picturing War in France, 1792–1856. Yale University Press, 2018.
