= Young Gaston, Known as the Angel of Foix =

Painting by Claudius Jacquand

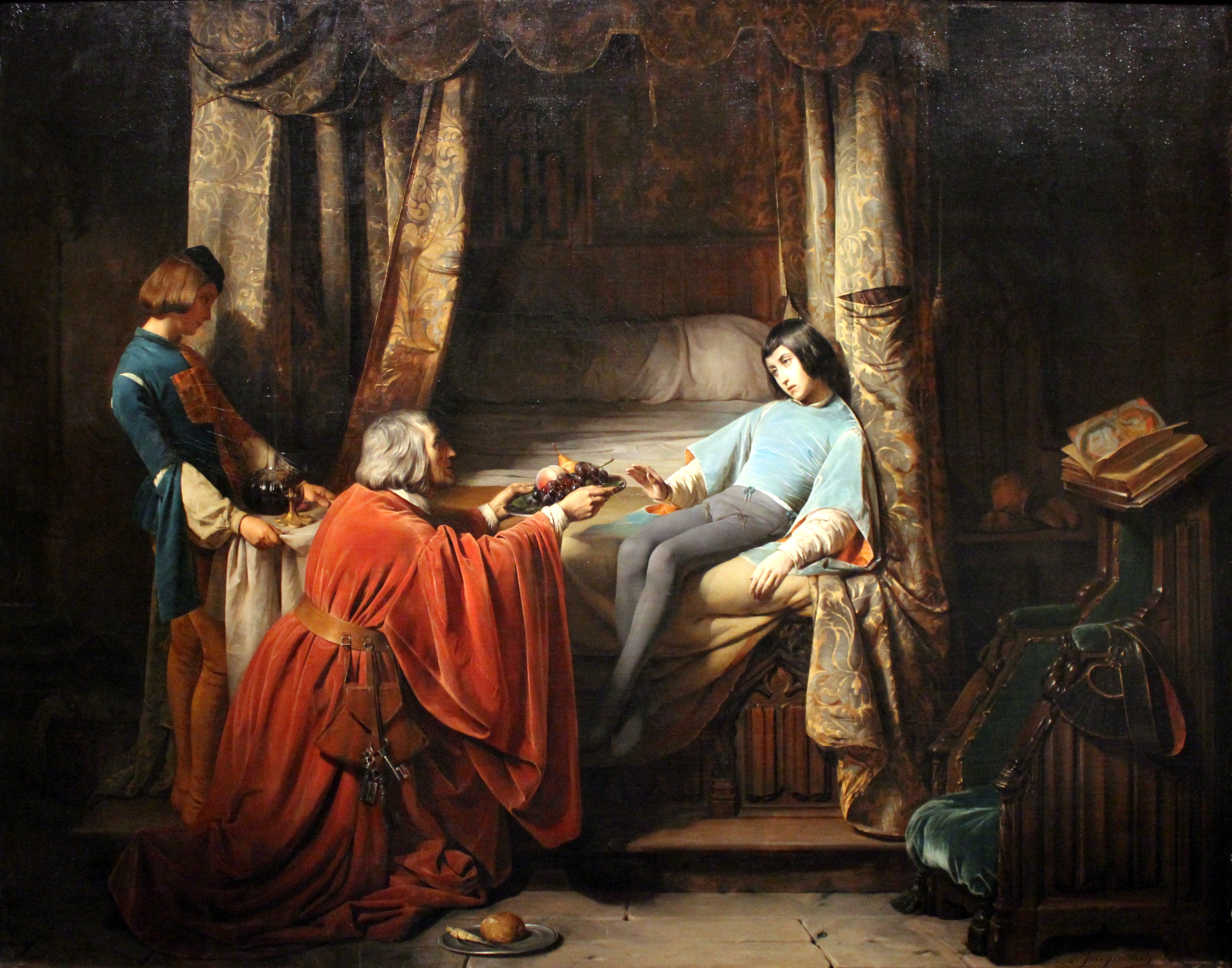
Young Gaston, Known as the Angel of Foix (1838) by Claudius Jacquand

Young Gaston, Known as the Angel of Foix is an 1838 oil on canvas painting by Claudius Jacquand, first exhibited at the Salon of 1838 in Paris, where it was praised by the art critics, then at the 1839 Brussels Salon, where it won a silver-gilt medal. Its owner donated it to the Louvre, where it still hangs, but retained the usufruct.

It shows the drama of Orthez in 1380 as told by Jean Froissart in his Chronicles, in which Gaston III, Count of Foix imprisoned his son Gaston after the latter tried to poison him. The Count later murdered the young Gaston.
