= The Kaïd, A Moroccan Chief =

1837 painting by Eugène Delacroix

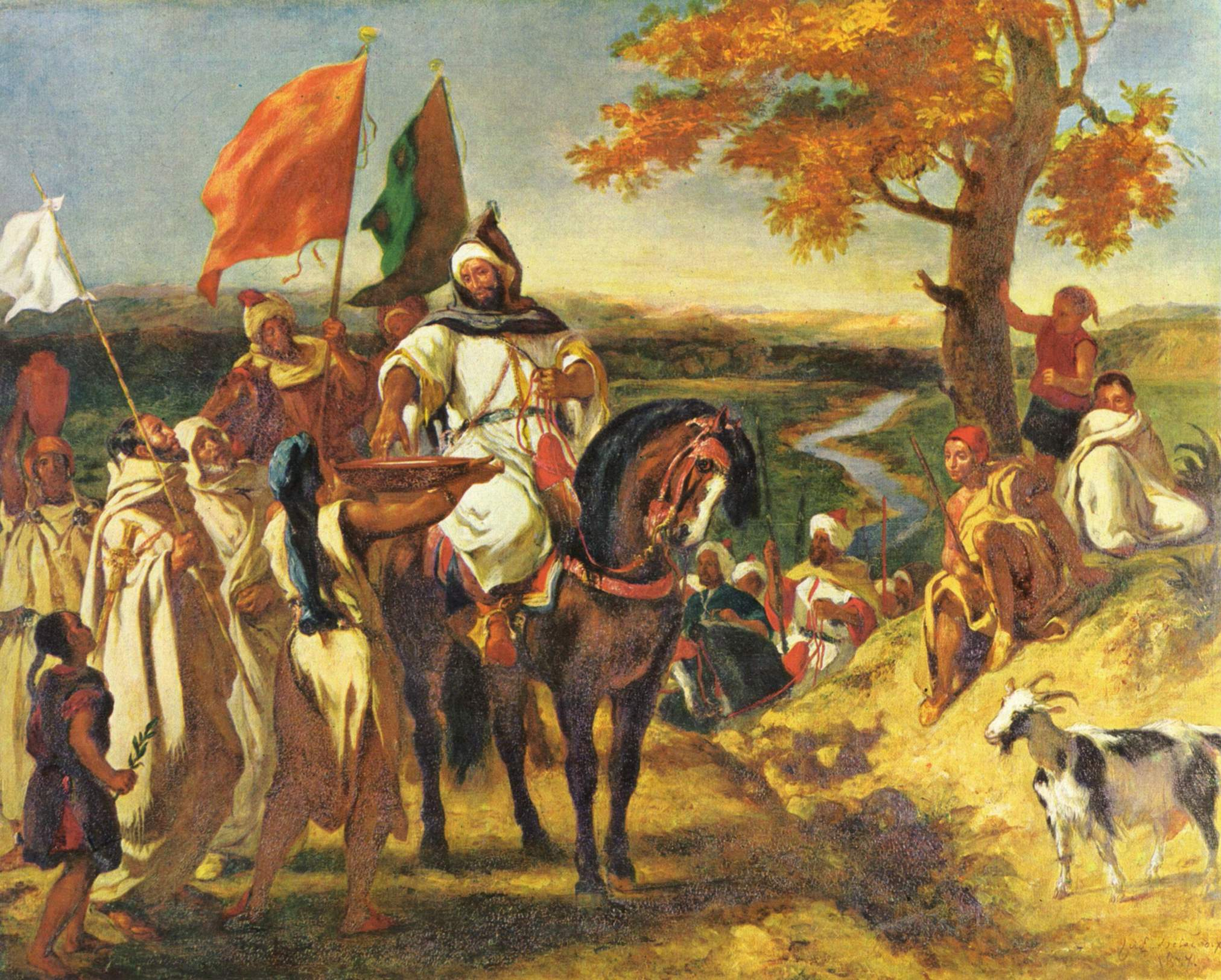
The Kaïd, A Moroccan Chief (1837) by Eugène Delacroix

The Kaïd, A Moroccan Chief is an Orientalist oil-on-canvas painting by the French artist Eugène Delacroix, signed and dated by the painter in 1837, and now in the Musée d'Arts de Nantes It is also known as Offering Milk, Arab Chief Among His Tribe and The Halt, or The Kaïd Accepting the Shepherds' Hospitality

It was inspired by the artist's stop-off in Ksar el-Kebir on 9 April 1832, during which he witnessed a peaceful greeting by a Moroccan chief. The work was exhibited at the Salon of 1838 at the Louvre in Paris and then in Nantes the following year, leading the town's art museum to buy it.
