= Jacques François Joseph Swebach-Desfontaines =

French painter and draughtsman (1769–1823)

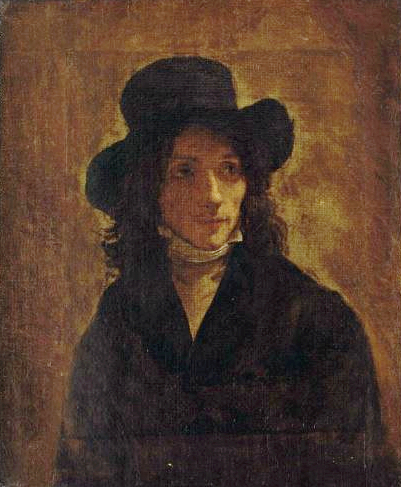
Portrait of Swebach-Desfontaines, by Louis-Léopold Boilly

Jacques François Joseph Swebach-Desfontaines, known as Fontaine (19 March 1769, Metz – 10 December 1823, Paris) was a French painter and designer. He is best known for his genre and battle scenes.

== Biography ==
He first learned painting from his father François Louis Swebach-Desfontaines (1749–1793), a self-taught amateur artist and a Member of the Scientific Society of Metz who illustrated Histoire naturelle : ou, Exposition des morceaux, les mieux choisis pour servir à l'étude de la minéralogie et de la cristallographie. Jacques François then studied with Joseph Duplessis in Paris. In the late 1780s, he frequented the woods near the Château de Fontainebleau, with Lazare Bruandet and Georges Michel, painting landscapes.

During the Revolution, his paintings were of a patriotic nature; notably The Young Darruder and Joseph Agricol Viala, both engraved by Charles-Melchior Descourtis. In 1798, he exhibited six troop and battle scenes at the Salon.

He was a designer and painter for the Manufacture de Sèvres from 1802 to 1813, where he was praised for his speedy execution. His battle scenes with horses were especially popular. He also worked for Dihl and Guérhard porcelain in 1806. That same year, he participated in creating the "Service Encyclopédique"; a table service commissioned by Napoleon to reward his Secretary of State, Hugues Bernard Maret, for managing the wedding arrangements of Stéphanie de Beauharnais and Charles, the future Grand Duke of Baden. It is currently on display at the Louvre Museum.

From 1815 to 1817, he worked in St. Petersburg, directing the Imperial Porcelain Factory, later known as the Lomonosov Porcelain Factory.

He was married to Antoinette-Prudence Pujolle and they had two sons, one of whom, Bernard-Édouard Swebach, was also a painter.

== Selected works ==
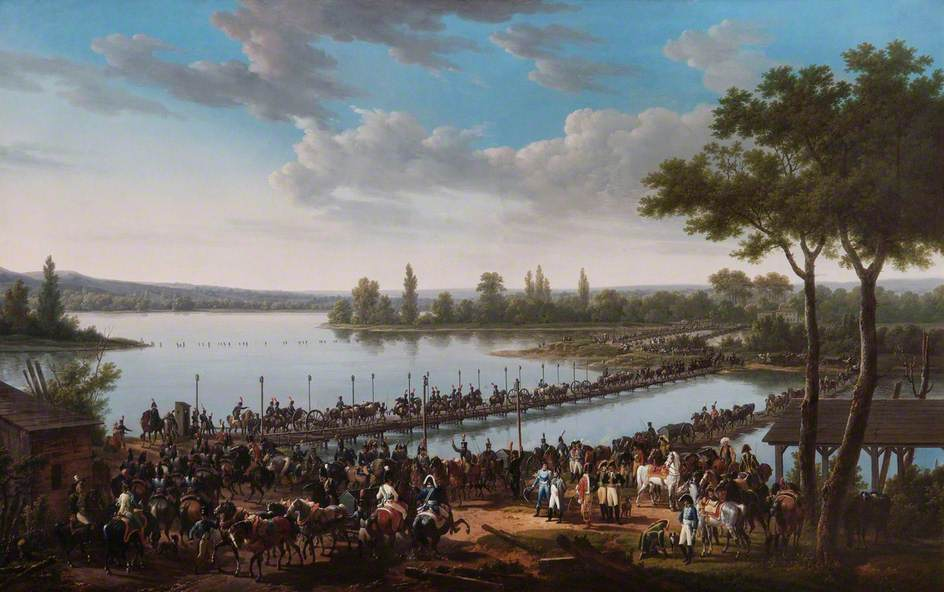
The Passage of the Danube by Napoleon Before the Battle of Wagram, 1810

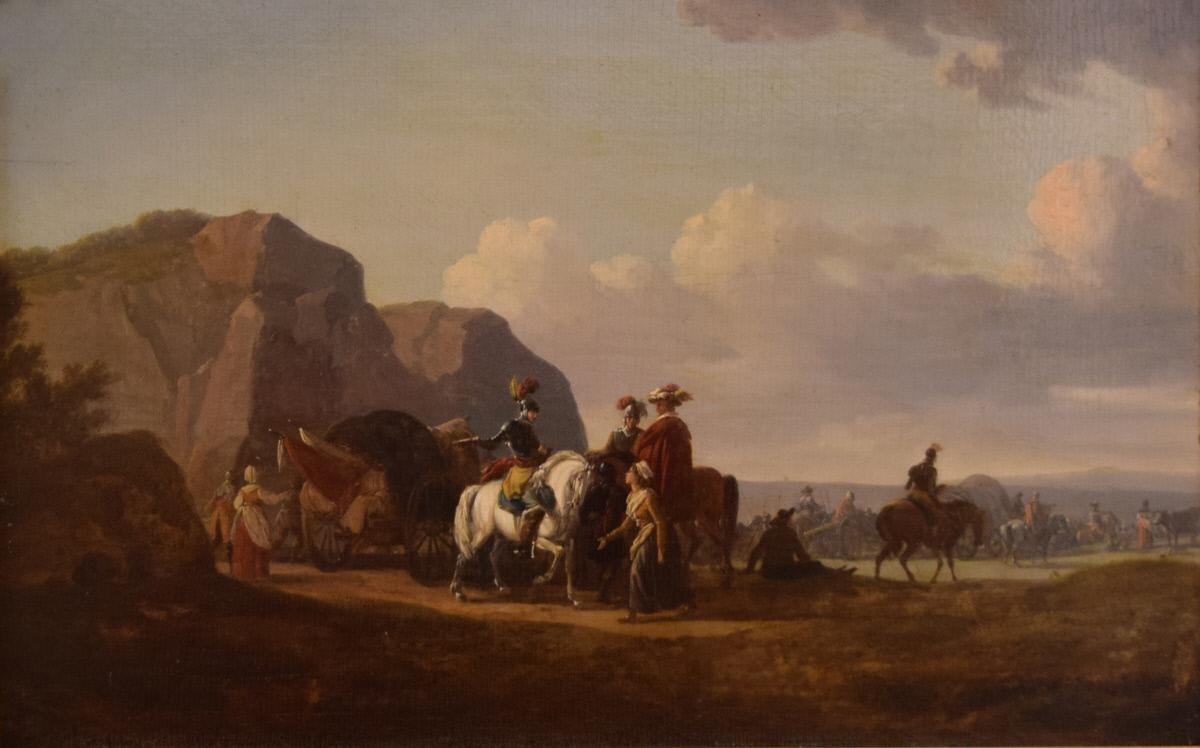
Army on the March

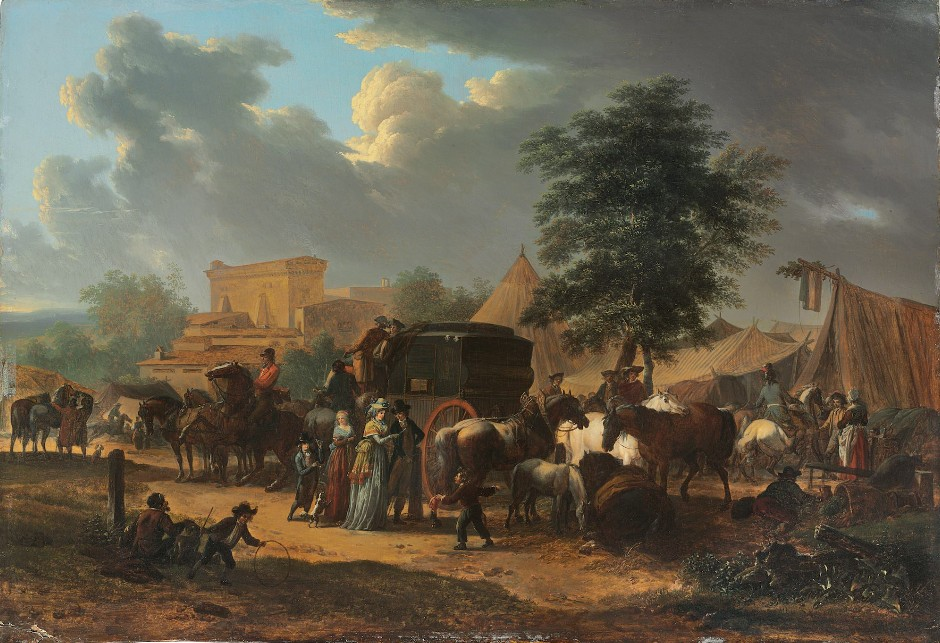
A Horse Market

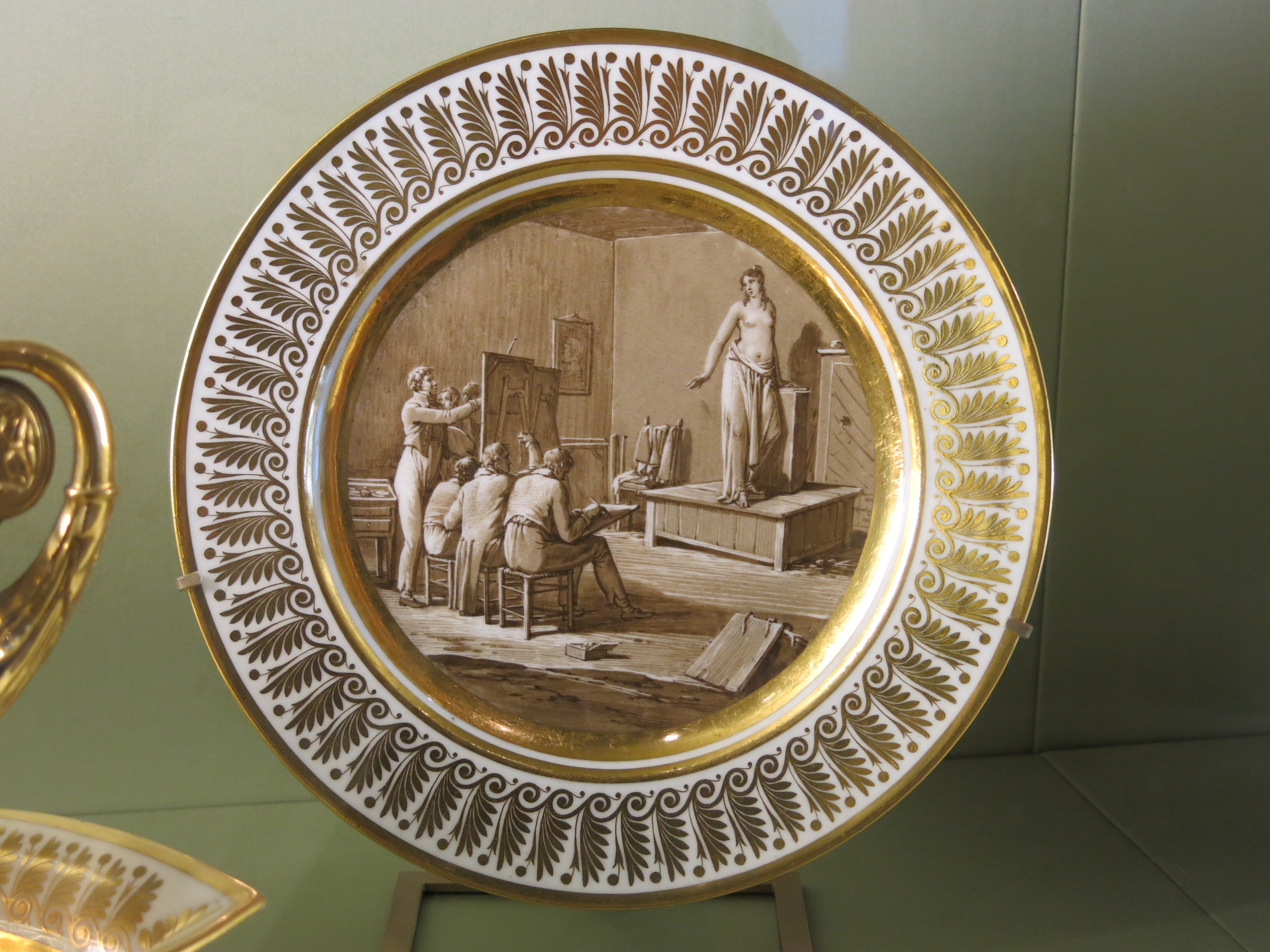
Plate from the Service Encyclopédique

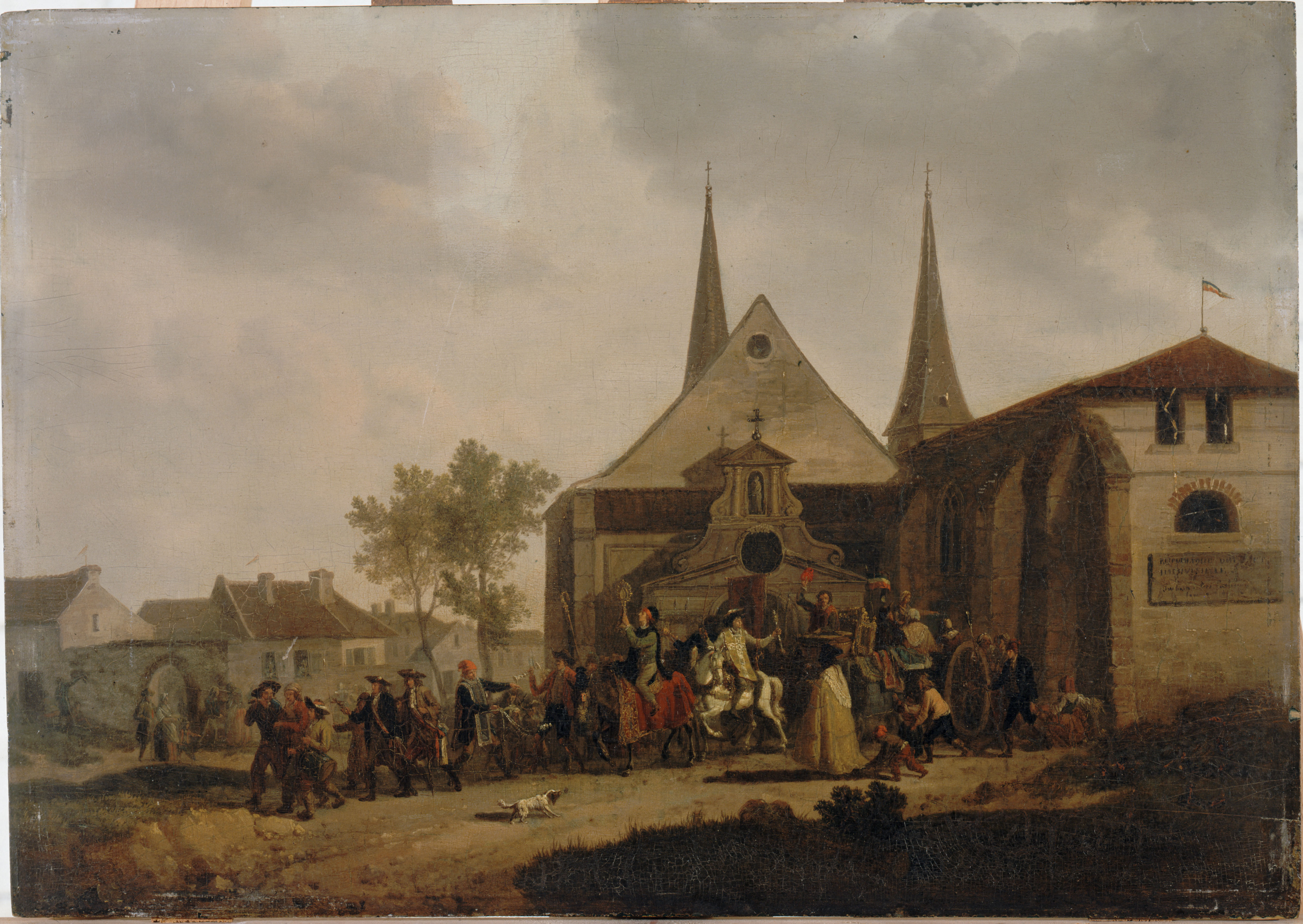
Decommissioning a Church

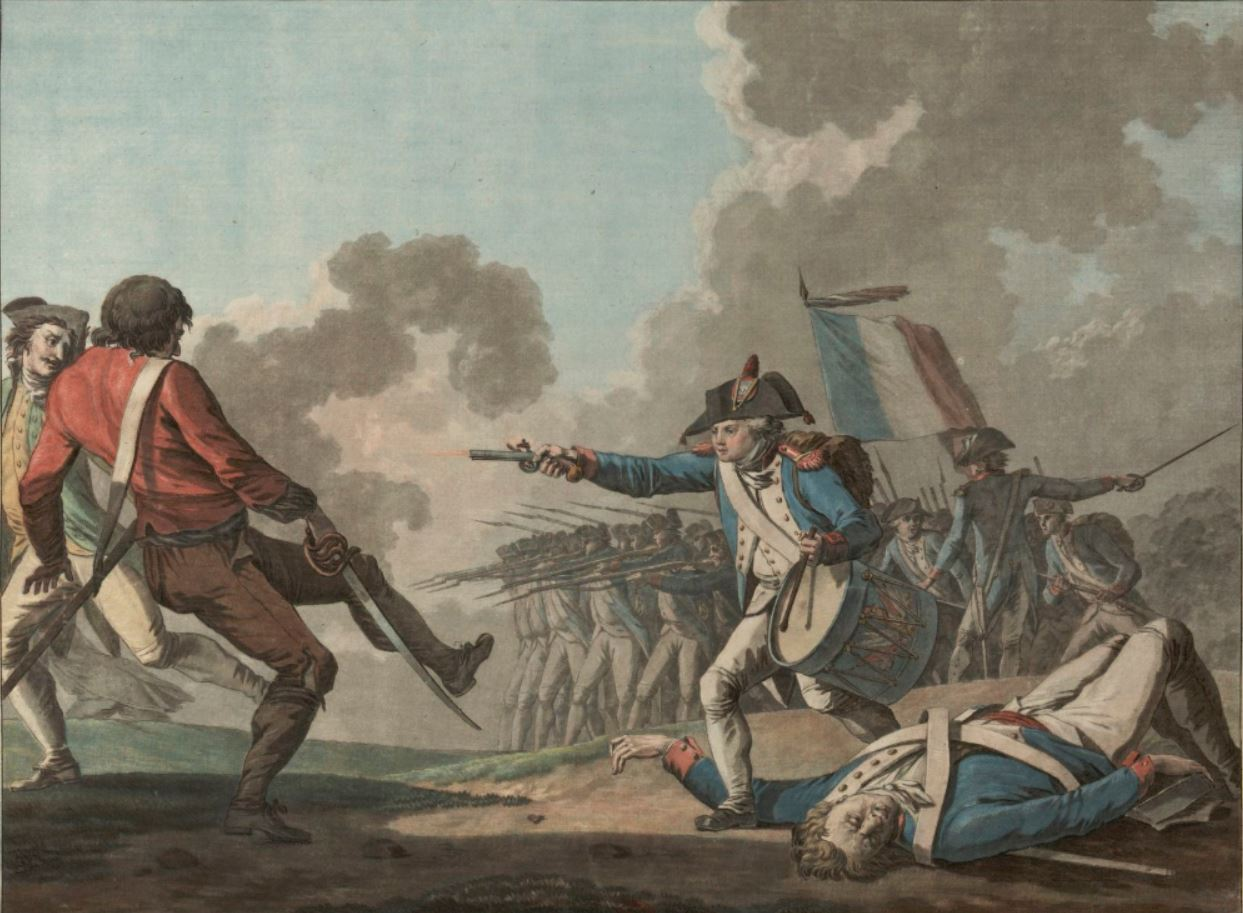
The drummer Darruder, avenging his father who was shot by the Vendéens
