= Van Dyck in London =

Painting by Camille Roqueplan

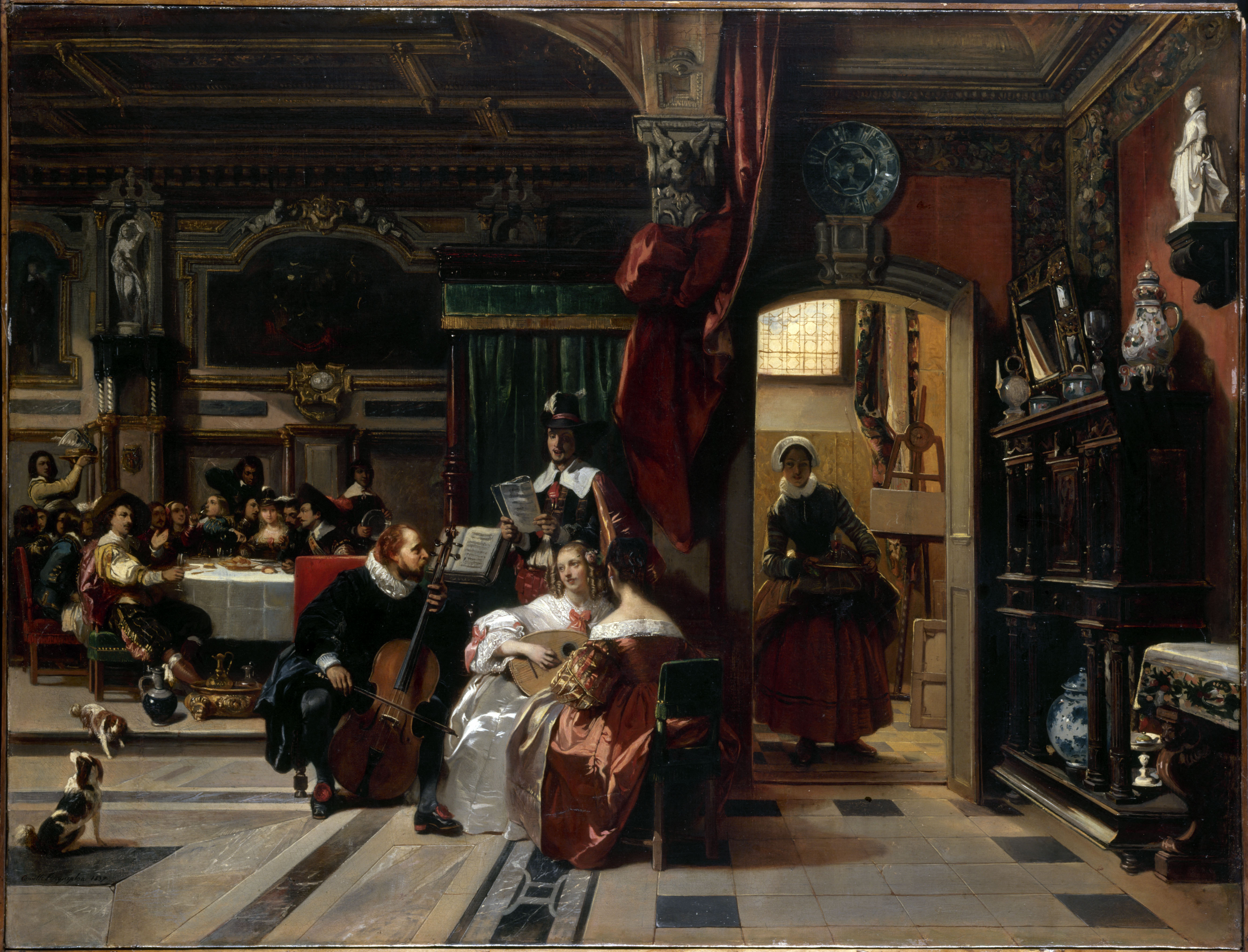
- Artist: Camille Roqueplan
- Year: 1837
- Type: Oil on canvas, history painting
- Dimensions: 89.5 cm × 116.5 cm (35.2 in × 45.9 in)
- Location: Musée des Beaux-Arts de la ville de Paris, Paris

Van Dyck in London (French: Van Dyck à Londres) is an 1837 history painting by the French artist Camille Roqueplan. It depicts the Flemish Baroque artist Anthony van Dyck seated at the dinner table in London with some musicians about to perform. In the background is an easel, implying it is in the artist's studio. Van Dyck enjoyed great success in England, producing a number of portraits and becoming court painter to Charles I.

Roqueplan was part of the Romantic movement that flourished in the first half of the nineteenth century. The previous year he had produced one of his best known works The Lion in Love. His depiction of Van Dyck was exhibited at the Salon of 1838 at the Louvre in Paris. Today its in the collection of the Musée des Beaux-Arts de la ville de Paris, having been acquired in 1902.

== Bibliography ==
- Rosenthal, Leon. Romanticism. Parkstone International, 2014.
- Verbraeken, Paul. Après & d'après Van Dyck: la récupération romantique au XIXe siècle. Blondé Artprinting International, 1999.
