= Bernard-Édouard Swebach =

French painter (1800–1870)

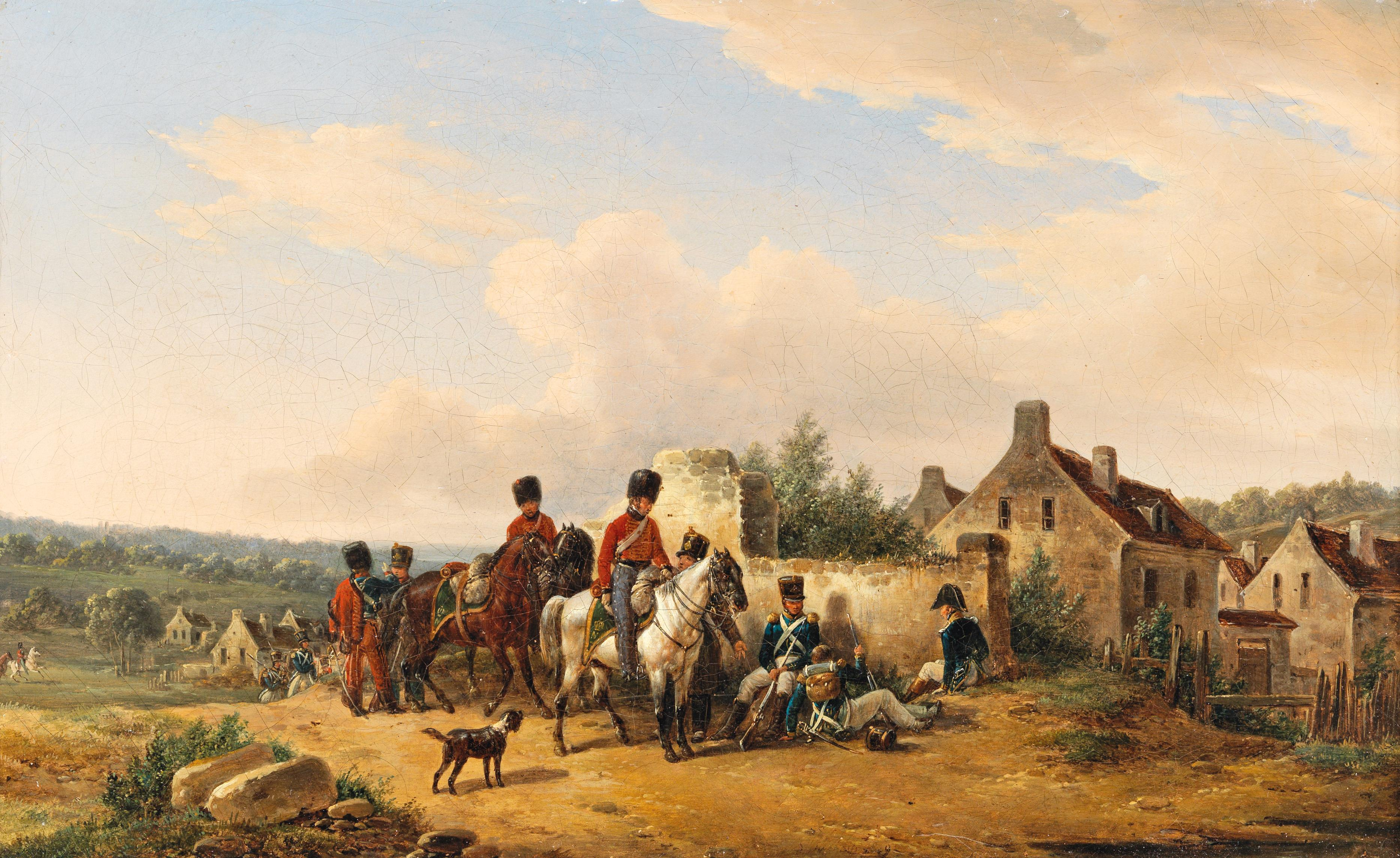
Imperial French Soldiers

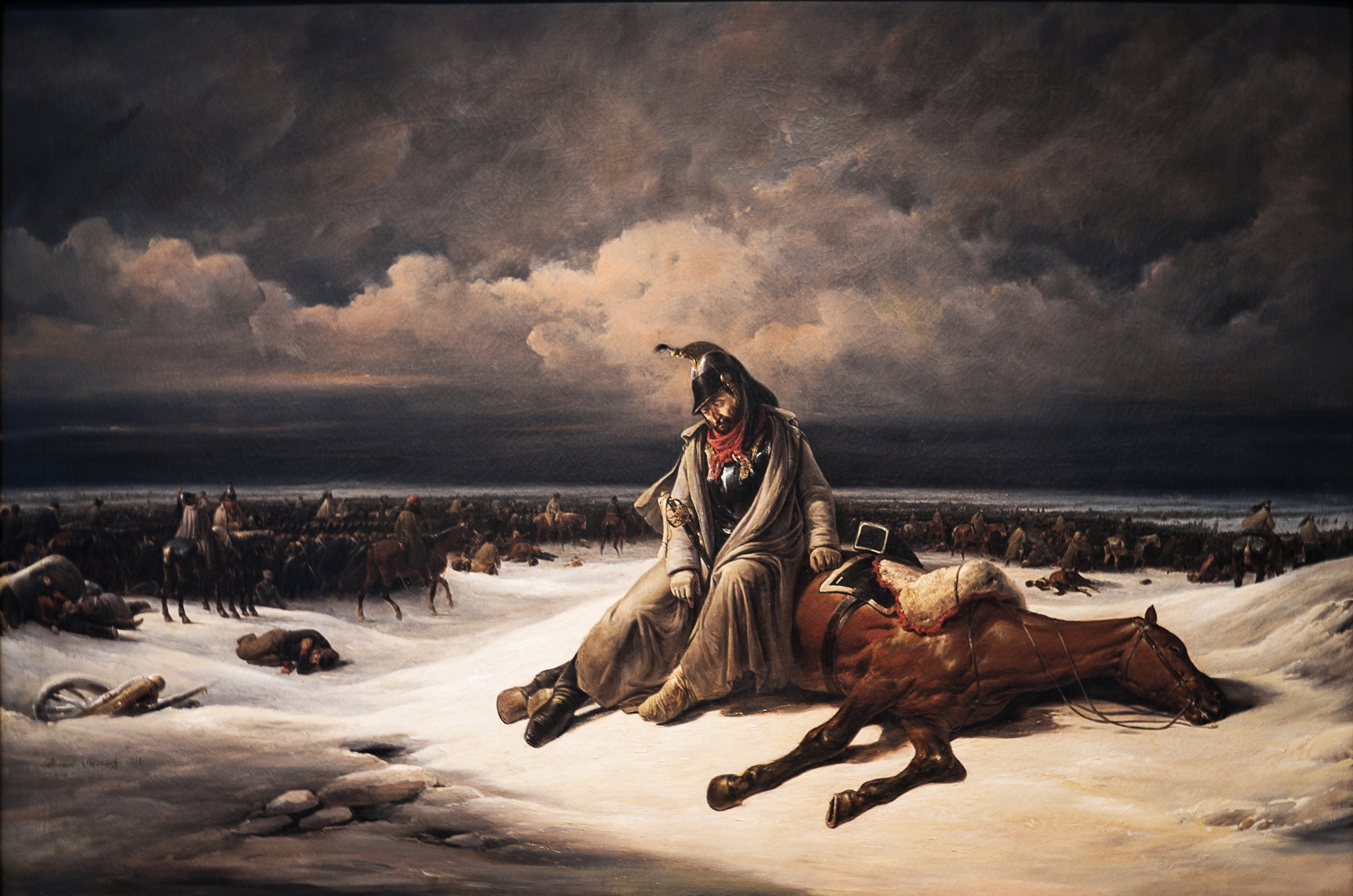
The Retreat from Russia

Bernard-Édouard Swebach (21 August 1800, Paris - 2 March 1870, Versailles) was a French painter and lithographer. He was known for his genre and historical scenes; usually featuring horses.

== Biography ==
His father, Jacques François Joseph Swebach-Desfontaines, was a painter and porcelain designer. From 1814, he trained at the École des Beaux-Arts while assisting in his father's workshop.

Following the abdication of Napoleon, he went with his father to St.Petersburg, where Tsar Alexander I had invited him to direct the Imperial Porcelain Factory.

In 1820, after their return to Paris, they established a joint workshop and produced what they called "four-handed paintings".

He began exhibiting at the Salon under his own name in 1822, with a scene depicting the Hussars using a warehouse for a stable. He was praised for his technical abilities, but criticized for not having a style of his own. After his father died the following year, he slowly developed his own style, based on British Romanticism. After 1838, he devoted himself primarily to lithography. A large collection of his works in that medium are kept at the Carnavalet Museum.

Many of his early and transitional paintings are difficult to attribute accurately, as both he and his father signed their works with "Swebach", or not at all.
