= Henri Victor Roulland =

- Born: 11 October 1751; Saint-Quentin-d'Elle, France
- Died: 6 February 1827 (aged 75); Rennes, France
- Military career
- Allegiance: Kingdom of France; Kingdom of France; French Republic; First French Empire; Kingdom of France
- Service years: 1770–1775, 1791–1816
- Rank: General de brigade
- Conflicts: French Revolutionary Wars; Siege of Landrecies
- Awards: Légion d'Honneur Chevalier 11 December 1803; Officier 14 June 1804

Henri Victor Roulland, or Rouland (11 September or October 1751 – 6 February 1827) was a French Brigadier General of the French Revolution and the French Revolutionary Wars. He led the heroic defense of the fortress of Landrecies during the Siege of Landrecies (1794), but was forced to surrender after a devastating artillery bombardment that lasted three days.

== Private life ==
Roulland was born in Saint-Quentin-d'Elle, the son of Pierre Rouland and Renée Pottier. He married:
1. Marie Anne Françoise Esnüe de Lavallée on 1 October 1796 in Craon, Mayenne; they divorced on 22 August 1798;
2. Jeanne Marie Charlotte Letestu; they had a son, Fleurius Aimé; she died in 1802;
3. Marie Elisabeth Louise Deshays-Piard de Quellenec on 8 August 1803 in Le Palais, Belle-Ile-en-Mer, Morbihan. She survived him by a few months.

== Career ==
Roulland became a private in the Régiment de Normandie on 22 September 1770. He took part in the campaign in Isle de France between 1771 and 1774. After being demobilised on 29 August 1775, he was appointed captain-general for the fermiers generaux des finances (tax farmers) in Alençon in 1776, a post he held until the French Revolution.

On 20 September 1791 he was elected chief of the Orne district battalion by its members, and was confirmed as Chef de brigade by the Représentants en mission Trullard and Berlier on 27 September 1793. The next day he was made General de brigade and commandant of Bergues.

On 26 January 1794 he was appointed commander of the fortress of Landrecies. Here his rank was made permanent on 12 April 1794. He led the defense of the fortress during the Siege of Landrecies (1794) by the Dutch States Army under the Hereditary Prince of Orange. He had to surrender the fortress on 30 April 1794 after heavy bombardment, which reduced the fortress to rubble. He was made a prisoner of war and was eventually transported to Hungary. He was exchanged as prisoner of war on 27 November 1795.

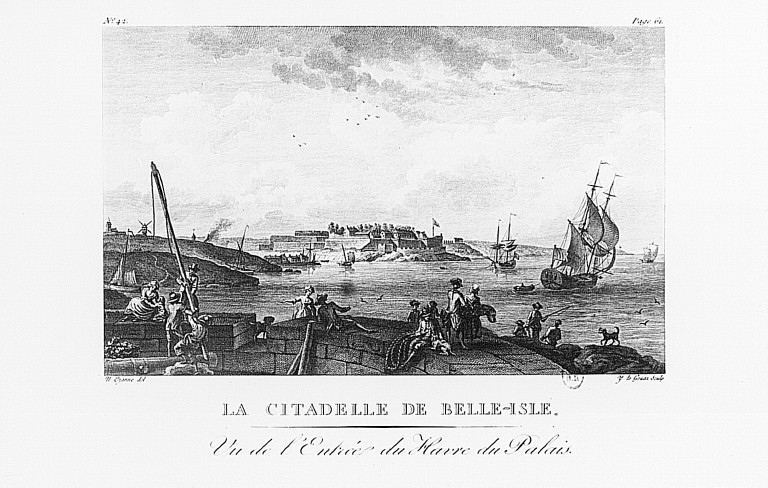
Citadel of Le Palais, Belle-Île-en-Mer, where Roulland commanded the garrison

After his return to France he was appointed commander of the demi-brigade of the Ille-et-Vilaine Département of the Armée des côtes de Brest on 16 December 1795; of the Manche département on 12 October 1797; of the Morbihan département on 1 January 1799; and of the Côtes-du-Nord département on 26 March 1800. In the latter two commands he took part in the third phase of the so-called Chouannerie. He commanded a column that on 5 August 1799 defeated a far smaller force of the rebelling Chouans in and near La Selle-en-Luitré, but failed to capture their leaders. In October 1799 he chased the rebel leader La Nougarède, who had beaten the republican forces at Saint-Aubin-du-Cormier on 5 October 1799, with a column of 4,000 soldiers from Rennes, but La Nougarède outwitted him by dispersing his own guerilla force, and then harassed Roulland's force with pinprick attacks.

He was mustered out for medical reasons in May 1801 and appointed commandant d'armes (commander of the garrison) of Belle-Île-en-Mer on 8 June 1801. Here he spent the rest of his career.

He was made a Chevalier of the Légion d'Honneur on 11 December 1803; promoted to Officier on 14 June 1804. After his retirement on 1 September 1816 he was made a Chevalier of the Ordre Royal et Militaire de Saint-Louis on 20 August 1823.

Roulland died on 6 February 1827 in Rennes.
