= Siege of Landrecies (1794) =

Siege of the War of the First Coalition

Coordinates: 50.1264°N 3.6908°E

- Part of the Low Countries theatre of the War of the First Coalition
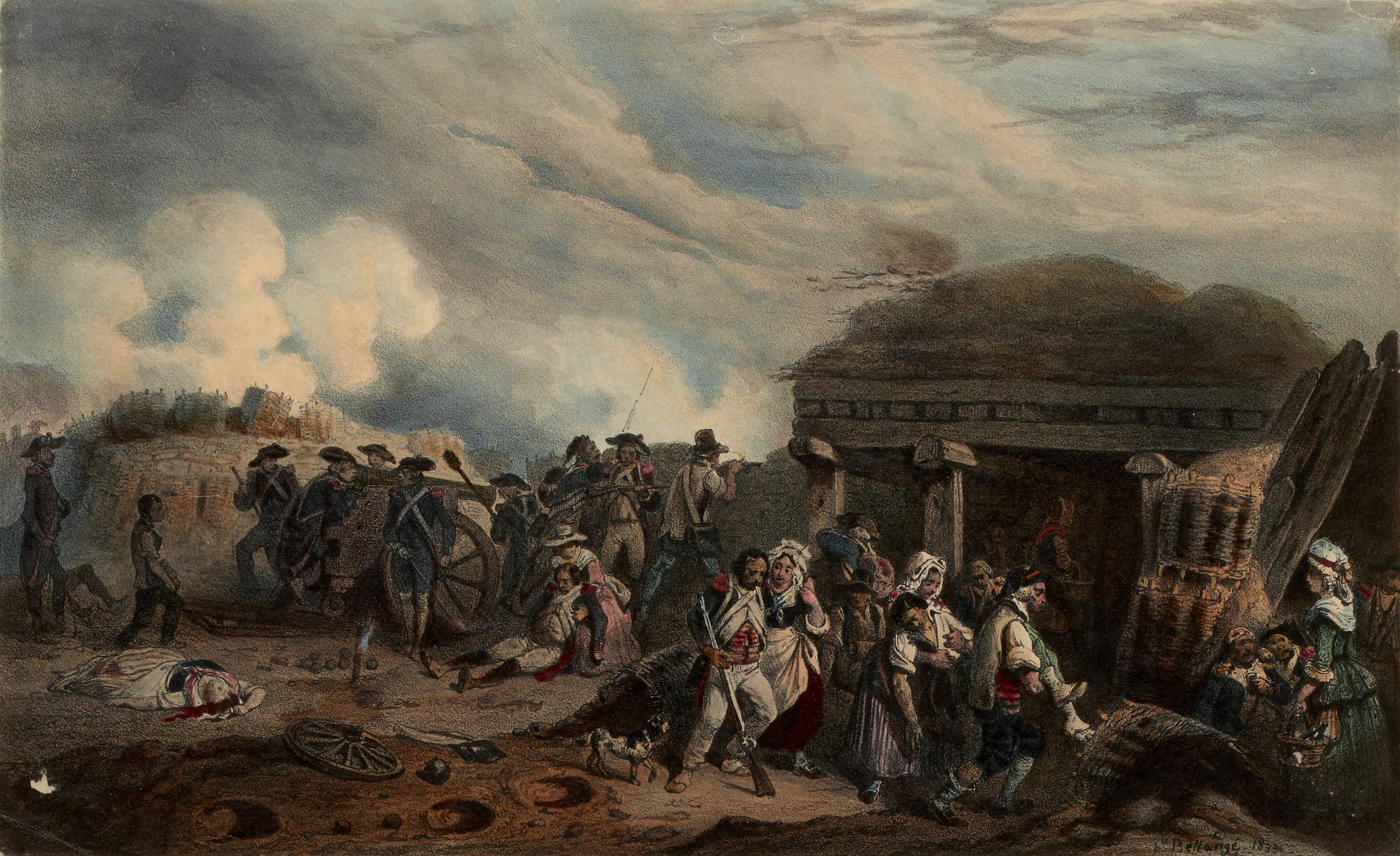
- Defense of Landrecies in April 1794. Engraving by Hippolyte Bellangé, 1833.
| Date | 17–30 April 1794 |
| Location | Landrecies, France |
| Result | Austro-Dutch victory |

Belligerents
| (French First Republic) French Republic | Dutch Republic; Habsburg monarchy |

Commanders and leaders
| (French First Republic) Henri Victor Roulland | (Dutch Republic) Prince of Orange |

Strength
| 7,000 | 20,000 |

Casualties and losses
| 2,000 | 500 |

The siege of Landrecies (17–30 April 1794) was a military operation during the Spring 1794 campaign in the Low Countries theatre of the War of the First Coalition. It was conducted by the veldleger (mobile army) of the Dutch States Army, commanded by the Hereditary Prince of Orange, assisted by auxiliary forces from the Habsburg Austrian army, against the fortress of Landrecies, garrisoned by troops of the French First Republic under general Henri Victor Roulland. The fortress capitulated on 30 April 1794.

== Background ==
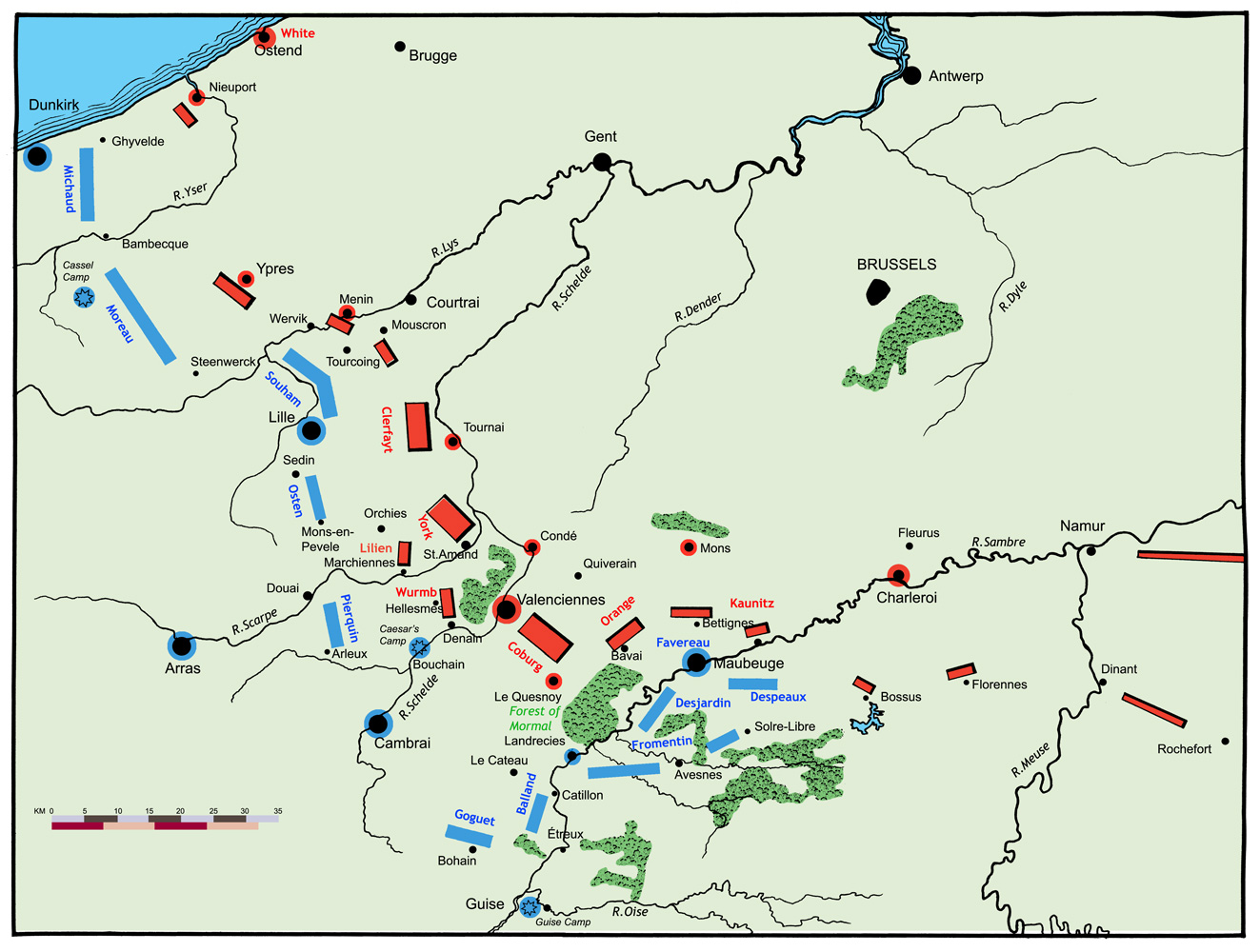
Positions of the armies in early April 1794 First Coalition forces French Republic forces

In the amended plan de campagne that the military leaders of the Coalition agreed upon in The Hague in early April the capture of the fortress of Landrecies was a key objective. The mobile army of the States Army (which had not been active since the Battle of Menin (1793)) was charged with obtaining this objective. Landrecies had long been a contested city between France and the Habsburg Netherlands of which it originally a part. In 1543 the French conquered it and repulsed an attempt by Charles V to retake it, though it was returned to him at the ensuing peace. In 1655 the city was taken by the French after a brief siege and not returned to the Spanish Netherlands at the Treaty of the Pyrenees of 1659. Sébastien Le Prestre de Vauban then gave it a fortress built according to the latest military practice. This made it impregnable in the Franco-Dutch War, and the War of the Spanish Succession when it withstood an attempt by Prince Eugene in 1712 to capture it.

The Coalition armies, under supreme command of the Austrian emperor Francis II were facing the French armies under general Jean-Charles Pichegru. The French started the Spring campaign of 1794 in March but in early April the Coalition forces in Flanders were ready to start their offensive. Emperor Francis reviewed the troops of the combined British–Austrian–Dutch army on 16 April 1794 near Cateau-Cambrésis. The next day, 17 April, the Allies attacked on a very broad front. The Dutch mobile army reached the glacis of the fortress of Cambrai that evening. The columns of the Prince of Hessen-Darmstadt and Major-General Van der Duyn captured Catillon-sur-Sambre, near Landrecies that evening.

== The siege ==
The Dutch mobile army (about 16,000 strong) was reinforced with Austrian infantry and auxiliaries under command of Major-General Count Baillet de Latour and Austrian artillery under Major-General Johann Kollowrat (about 4,000). On 18 April 1794 this corps left its camp near Cambrai and marched on Landrecies. On 19 April the force made preparations and on 20 April the corps opened a three-pronged attack on the fortress. Two columns marched via Fontaine-au-Bois and the Forêt de Mormal toward the Sambre river, where they took the villages of Hapegarde, Etoguis and the reinforced camp of Preux-au-Bois, within range of the artillery of the fortress. The Swiss Guards of the brigade of De Gumoëns and the brigade of Hesse-Darmstadt distinguished themselves in this fight. The middle column overran the redoubts and demi-lunes of the outer fortress. The garrison of the fortress was forced to withdraw within its walls. The Dutch losses were 23 officers and 358 other ranks.

The mobile army immediately started to invest the fortress. Work was begun on a line of field works that ran in front of the fortress, with its endpoints on the Sambre river, cutting the fortress off from overland access. Two batteries were placed on the main approaches to the town, and work on a second, countervailing, system of trenches was prepared. The Hereditary Prince made the chateau of Bousies his headquarters, and the Austrian auxiliaries (Hungarians, Serbs and Croats), destined to do the spadework for the entrenchments, built a camp in the forest of Mormal. After 20 April the preparations for the intended bombardment progressed slowly as the mobile army had to provide troops for the operations of the other Coalition forces that were needed to deflect French attempts at relief of the fortress (8,000 men on 22 April alone). Those attempts at relief were defeated by the Coalition in the Battles of Villers-en-Cauchies and Beaumont-en-Cambresis. Sorties by the garrison also hindered the preparations.

On 26 April the stadtholder, William V, the father of the Hereditary Prince, and Captain-General of the States Army, paid a visit to the camp of the besiegers. During this visit the son ordered a demonstration of the artillery, though not all guns were yet in place. The stadtholder was so impressed that he decided to stay for the rest of the bombardment, to do a bit of "siege-seeing".

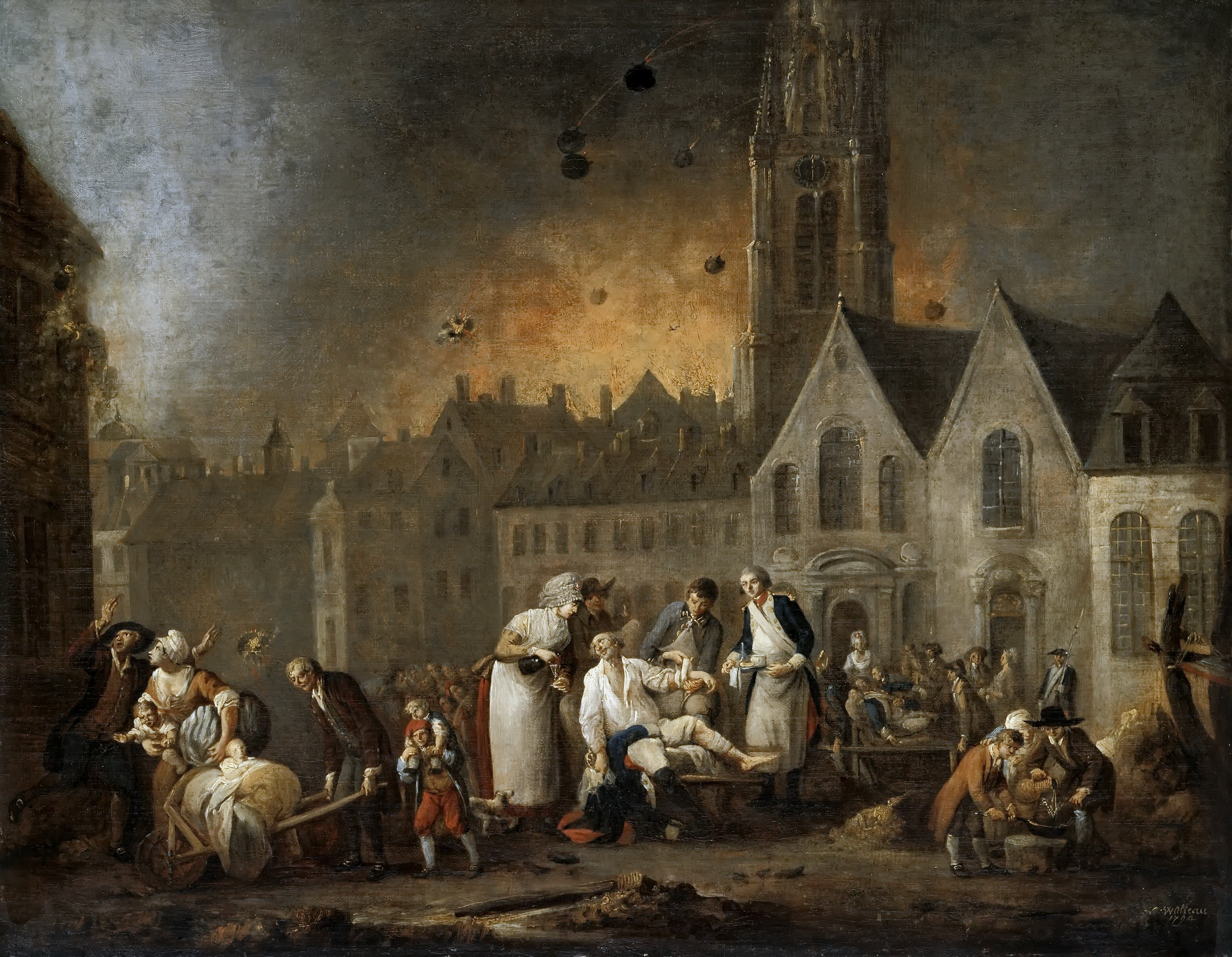
Scene by Louis Joseph Watteau from the siege of Lille in 1792, which resembles what Landrecies must have looked like.

The gun emplacements were finished on 28 April. Eleven batteries with a total of 48 guns (varying from 3-pdrs to 24-pdrs) and 18 siege mortars (varying from 30 to 60 pounds caliber) were in place. These guns would fire about 14,000 projectiles during the three days of the bombardment, that started on 28 April. The devastation of the fortress and town was immense. Hardly a house remained undamaged. The front of the attack was leveled. Around 2,000 people (both soldiers and civilians) were killed (one mortar bomb killed a woman and her eight children at one stroke). But the civilians took part in the defense, organised as artilleurs-bourgeois (burgher artillerists) and stood shoulder to shoulder with the battalions of the Meuse and Moselle that formed the garrison. Their wives nursed the wounded and succoured the dying. The city would later collectively receive the Légion d'Honneur for its bravery.

Despite the severe losses the garrison commander, general Roulland, at first refused repeated demands to surrender, possibly because the French launched a desperate last attempt to relieve the fortress on 27 April, but this again came to nothing. However, the bombardment did not miss its influence on the morale of the troops. On 29 April an order for a sortie was refused and Roulland convened a council of war of the soldiers, as was sometimes done in the French revolutionary army. This council asked him to consider a surrender. The pressure of the council steadily increased and on 30 April Roulland gave in: he asked for a ceasefire. This was immediately granted, and followed by protracted negotiations about a capitulation on terms. The negotiations were conducted by the Dutch quarter-master-general Bentinck and the Austrian major-general Mack on the Coalition side, and general Roulland on the French side. They led to the capitulation with honor of the French garrison on 30 April. The garrison had been reduced to 5,000 men. They became prisoners-of-war in the Dutch Republic. The fortress was taken over by Swiss and Dutch Guard regiments.

== Aftermath ==
The next day Emperor Francis and the stadtholder reviewed the defeated French troops filing by. The Hereditary Prince handed the keys of the city to the Emperor at this occasion.

After the fall of Landrecies the Austrians did nothing for eleven days, as if they had forgotten why the fortress had been taken in the first place. Only on 12 May did operations of the combined Austro-Dutch forces resume near Le Cateau-Cambrésis. A chance to cut off Pichegru was missed, however, because of hesitation by the Emperor. This did not bode well for the remainder of the campaign. Indeed, the tide eventually turned in favor of the French after the Battle of Fleurus (26 June 1794), and they retook Landrecies on 17 July 1794 after a brief siege.

The Hereditary Prince apparently had made a good impression on the Emperor. When general Kaunitz disappointed him by his hesitant conduct, the Emperor replaced him by the Hereditary Prince in May 1794, giving the Prince command of all Dutch and Austrian forces near the Sambre.
