= Bérigny =

- Commune
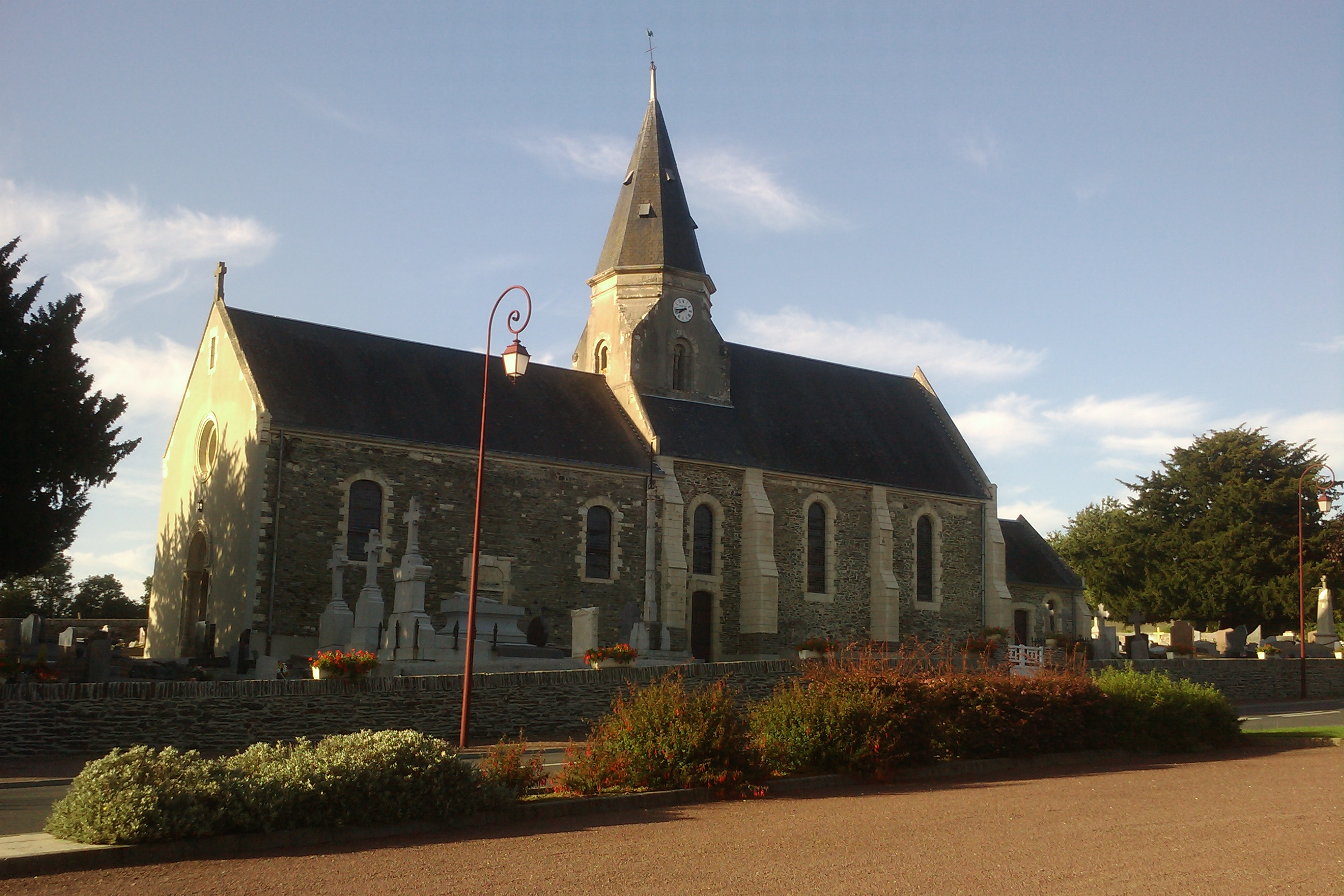
- The church in Bérigny
- Location of Bérigny
- Location within France Location within Normandy
- Coordinates: 49°08′37″N 0°56′23″W
- Country: France
- Region: Normandy
- Department: Manche
- Arrondissement: Saint-Lô
- Canton: Pont-Hébert
- Intercommunality: Saint-Lô Agglo

Government
  - Mayor (2020–2026): Denis Lecluze
- Area^{1}: 12.15 km^{2} (4.69 sq mi)
- Elevation: 130 m (430 ft)
- Highest elevation: 159 m (522 ft)
- Lowest elevation: 73 m (240 ft)
- Population (2023): 442
  - Density: 36.4/km^{2} (94.2/sq mi)
- Time zone: UTC+01:00 (CET)
  - Summer (DST): UTC+02:00 (CEST)
- INSEE/Postal code: 50046 /50810
- ^{1} French Land Register data, which excludes lakes, ponds, glaciers > 1 km^{2} (0.386 sq mi or 247 acres) and river estuaries.

Bérigny is a commune in the Manche department in the Normandy region in northwestern France.

== Population ==
Historical population
Year	Pop.	±% p.a.
1968	372	—
1975	314	−2.39%
1982	340	+1.14%
1990	359	+0.68%
1999	367	+0.25%
2007	364	−0.10%
2012	404	+2.11%
2017	425	+1.02%
2023	442	+0.66%
Source: INSEE

== See also ==
- Communes of the Manche department
