= Dutch States Army =

Army of the Dutch Republic (1575–1795)

- Staatse leger
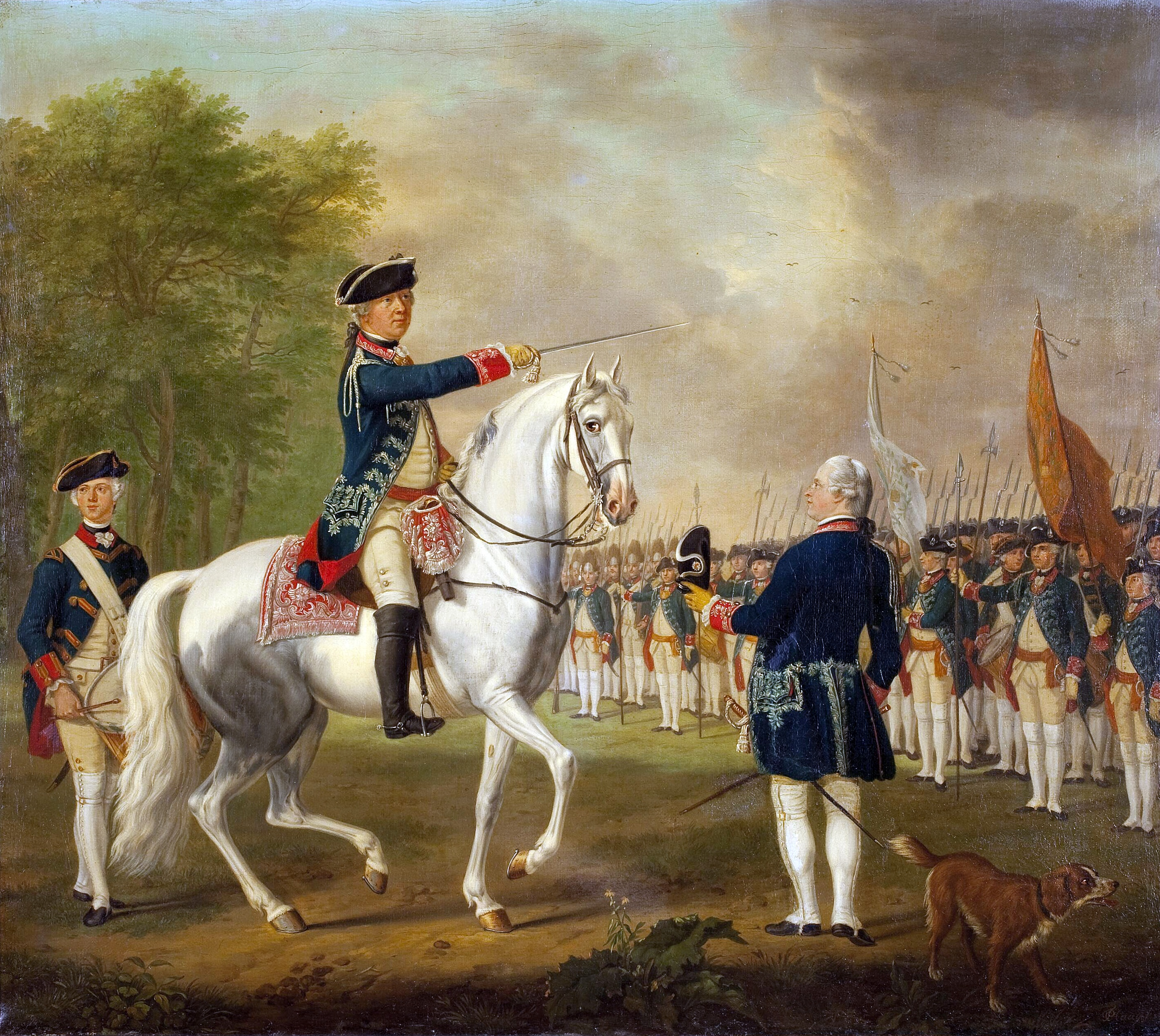
- 1778 painting of the States Army's Dutch Guards exercising in the Hague
- Country: Dutch Republic
- Type: Army
- Role: Ground warfare
- Engagements: List of engagements: Eighty Years' War; War of the Jülich Succession; Thirty Years' War; Dano-Swedish War; Second Anglo-Dutch War; Franco-Dutch War; Nine Years' War; War of the Spanish Succession; War of the Austrian Succession; War of the First Coalition

The Dutch States Army (Dutch: Staatse leger) was the army of the Dutch Republic. It was usually called this, because it was formally the army of the States-General of the Netherlands, the sovereign power of that federal republic. This army was brought to such a size and state of readiness that it was able to hold its own against the armies of the major European powers of the extended 17th century, Habsburg Spain and the France of Louis XIV, despite the fact that these powers possessed far larger military resources than the Republic. It played a major role in the Eighty Years' War (opposite the Spanish Army of Flanders) and in the wars of the Grand Alliance with France after 1672.

== Precursors ==
Despite the fact that the standard work by Ten Raa and De Bas about the States Army in its title proudly proclaims that the foundation of the army was laid in the first year of the Dutch war of independence, 1568, modern historians put the start date later, between 1576 (the year in which the States-General joined the Dutch Revolt against Philip II of Spain, and started raising its own troops) and 1588 (the year in which the northern Netherlands became a republic after the departure of the Earl of Leicester), though there is no definite agreement on an exact date. However, the army did not spring wholly formed from the brow of Mars; there were predecessors. The roots of the army are to be found in the armies raised by the rulers of the Habsburg Netherlands, Philip and his father, Charles V in their wars with France before 1559. These were mercenary armies recruited on the "market" of "Landsknechte" and followed the organisation and military customs of that type of mercenary.

William the Silent, prince of Orange, who would become the leader of the Dutch Revolt, had received his military education in the service of Charles V (he raised his own landsknecht regiment in 1552) and he followed the Habsburg example when he himself organised his invasion of the Netherlands in 1568. His experiences with the German mercenaries he raised were not encouraging: they had a predilection for mutiny before a battle and his invasion was easily defeated by the better-trained and disciplined forces of the duke of Alba. After his short excursion to France, to fight on the Huguenot side in 1569–1571, he apparently came away with a favorable impression of French military organisation and tactics, which prompted him to implement a number of reforms when he started raising mercenary troops on behalf of the rebellious States of Holland after 1572. These reforms included taking away the right of self-government of the mercenary bands and their corporate form of military justice; these organisational aspects were henceforth modeled on the French example. Orange also shrank the size of the companies to about 150 men, and introduced the French model of commissioned and non-commissioned officers to replace the Landsknecht organisation. He finally changed the proportion of firearms to polearms decidedly in favor of the former in the newly raised companies.

Except for the preponderance of firearms, these reforms remained in place throughout the history of the mercenary troops, first of the States of Holland, and later of the States-General (though they are often ascribed to Orange's son Maurice of Nassau). In the interim between 1576 and 1588, however, the preponderance of the forces fighting for the States-General, either in its own pay, or in the pay of foreign allies, like the duke of Anjou and the Earl of Leicester, did not follow this organisational model These forces can, however, not be seen as predecessors of the States Army. That army only took shape after the Union of Utrecht was formed in 1579 and the influence of the States of Brabant and the States of Flanders in the States-General was eliminated due to the territorial gains of the duke of Parma who conquered their territories. The core of that new army were the troops raised by Holland on the model introduced after 1572.

== Financing ==
=== Raising funds ===
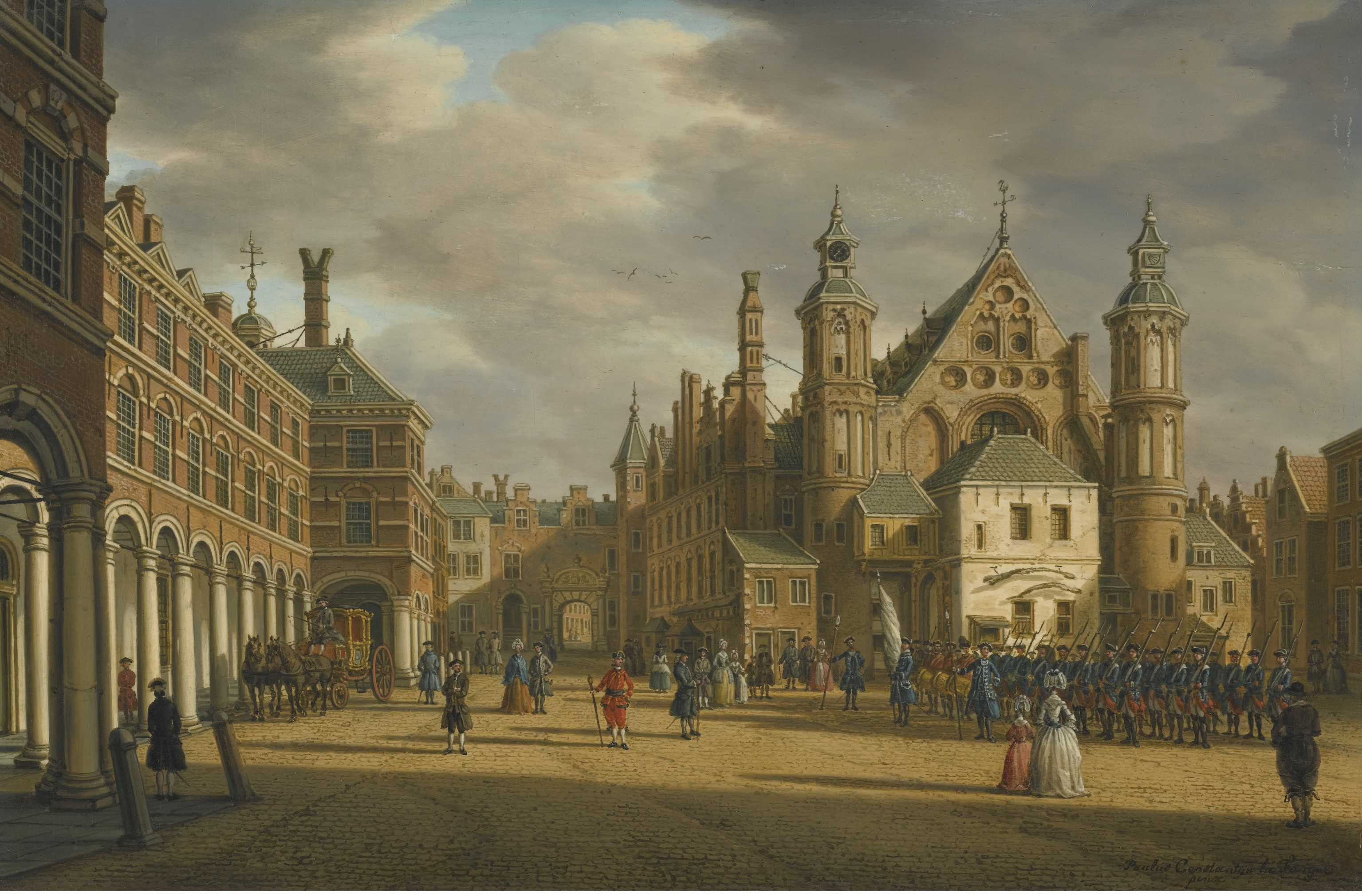
A military parade at the Binnenhof in the 1760s

Although the financing of a military force is usually seen as "derivative", in the case of the States Army it played an important formative role, and also influenced the peculiarities of the organisation. Though 16th-century armies were usually preponderantly mercenary, there often were elements of feudal levies and of volunteers. These were lacking in the States Army (the civic militia or Schutterij was not part of the army). Apparently it never occurred to the authorities in the Republic to organize a volunteer or conscript army; mercenaries were the only feasible option. This had already been the case under the Habsburg rulers, when the States of the several provinces were asked to pay for the raising of the Habsburg armies, and played a role in their financial administration, like mustering. The authorities of the rebel provinces continued where they had left off in this respect. They were, however, content to limit their role to financial administration and the raising of the necessary money via the financing of a fiscal-military state (see the financial history of the Dutch Republic). The latter already formed a considerable burden on the public finances of the provinces in the time of Charles V, and contributed to the formation of early-modern institutions for the management of the public debt, in which the Dutch had a pioneering role.

These financial institutions helped the Dutch Republic to "punch above its weight" in military matters. Without the international "open market" for professional soldiers, the Republic, with its population of about 1.5 million in the 17th century, would simply have lacked the manpower base to compete with countries like Spain (10 million inhabitants at the time) and France (20 million).

=== Strength ===
By the end of 1579, the belligerents were at a stalemate, as neither Parma nor Orange had sufficient troops and materiel to field an army capable of conducting a major offensive. Having withdrawn his Spanish and Italian troops as required by the Union of Arras, Parma had replaced his foreign personnel with German or 'native' (Low Countries) soldiers for a total of 93 infantry companies, 57 of which were necessary for garrisoning strategic points. The remaining 36 companies (c. 5,400–7,200 men) were available for attack. The combined forces of the rebel States-General were twice as large on paper, with Orange's war budget of December 1579 listing 96 defensive companies on garrison duty plus 101 companies available for field action. But in practice he could field far fewer, as the provinces were customarily hesitant to agree to deploy their troops beyond their own borders. In part, this was because irregular payment for out-of-province soldiers was a known systemic problem, which could cause mutiny when unpaid soldiers could not feed themselves and resorted to force against civilians, desertion, or defection to the enemy. Examples include 'trouble' caused by Edward Norreys's four English companies stationed in the frontier city of Tournai, because the States of Flanders had failed to pay their wages, and the key border outpost of Bouchain fell to Parma's troops in September 1580 in part because the Union of Utrecht had 'too much to do' within its own borders to send any money.

The States Army was backed in defense by the Schutterij citizen militia who also acted a semi-trained reserve from which additional recruits could be drawn. In 1629 the republic had 50,000 militia mobilized to back its 70,000 regular soldiers.

The following table gives the strengths of the Dutch States Army, the Army of Flanders and the French army at pivotal years in their respective conflicts.

Year	States Army	Army of Flanders	French Army
1588	20,500	63,455	50,000
1607	62,000	49,765	10,000
1621	55,000	62,600	
1635	70,000	63,258	200,000
1648	60,000	65,458	
1650	30,000		
1667	53,000		134,000
1672	90,000		280,000
1680	40,000		165,000
1689	102,000		420,000
1700	45,000		140,000
1701	74,000		
1712	119,000		380,000
1727	50,000		
1736	40,000		
1741	65,000		
1744	80,000		
1745	96,000		
1748	127,000		
1753	38,000		
1792	44,000		
1793	60,000		

Chart showing the size of the Dutch Army in comparison to the French Army, the part of the French Army that could reasonably be deployed into the Netherlands, and the strength together with the coalition forces that the Dutch could combine with. THe latter allowed the achievement of local parity and sometimes even superiority with the French Army that allowed commanders such as Marlborough to achieve victories. (> 1.0 = Coalition advantage, ≈ 1.0 = Numerical parity, < 1.0 = French local superiority)

Comparative Army Strengths, Deployable French Strength, Coalition Strength, and Parity Ratio,,,,,,
Year	States Army	Army of Flanders	French Army	French Deployable (~40%)	Coalition Strength (Dutch+English+Austrian)	Parity Ratio (Coalition to French Deployable)
1588	20,500	63,455	50,000	20,000	20,500	1.03
1607	62,000	49,765	10,000	4,000	62,000	15.50
1621	55,000	62,600	35,000	14,000	55,000	3.93
1635	70,000	63,258	200,000	80,000	70,000	0.88
1648	60,000	65,458	250,000	100,000	60,000	0.60
1650	30,000	—	100,000	40,000	30,000	0.75
1667	53,000	—	134,000	54,000	53,000	0.98
1672	90,000	—	280,000	112,000	120,000	1.07
1680	40,000	—	165,000	66,000	40,000	0.61
1689	102,000	—	420,000	168,000	150,000	0.89
1700	45,000	—	140,000	56,000	100,000	1.79
1701	74,000	—	220,000	88,000	140,000	1.59
1712	119,000	—	380,000	152,000	200,000	1.32
1727	50,000	—	160,000	64,000	90,000	1.41
1736	40,000	—	160,000	64,000	85,000	1.33
1741	65,000	—	200,000	80,000	110,000	1.38
1744	80,000	—	280,000	112,000	130,000	1.16
1745	96,000	—	300,000	120,000	140,000	1.17
1748	127,000	—	350,000	140,000	160,000	1.14
1753	38,000	—	150,000	60,000	70,000	1.17
1792	44,000	—	150,000	60,000	80,000	1.33
1793	60,000	—	750,000	300,000	300,000	1.00

=== Reforms after 1588 ===
Mercenary armies leveled the playing field. But they were expensive to maintain. For instance, the cost of fielding the States Army before 1609 (the year of the Twelve Years' Truce) was about 600,000 guilders annually. In the period between 1621 and 1629 (when the Republic was on the defensive against Spain) the cost rose to between 800,000 and 1 million guilders annually. After 1629 (when the Republic went on the offensive and increased the size of the army) the cost rose again to between 1.5 and 2 million guilders annually, with a peak of 3 million in 1632 (when Frederick Henry made his sweep of fortresses in the Meuse valley). These costs contributed to the heavy burden the Dutch tax payer had to bear: Holland alone contributed 9.3 million guilders in 1630; 11 million in 1634; 12.3 million in 1635; and in 1640 10.2 million to the war budget. These sums exceeded the ordinary revenues of the province. The difference had to be borrowed from investors. In 1634 the Southern Quarter of the province alone already owed 44.4 million guilders. Still, the Republic, and especially the province of Holland, generated so many savings that needed profitable investment opportunities, that the Dutch capital market had little trouble in generating the necessary public loans. The credit of the States was excellent, because the system of public finance, with its revenue streams dedicated to the service of the public debt (unique at the time in Europe, though England would copy it after 1689) attracted the confidence of investors. (See Economic history of the Netherlands (1500–1815)). This system of mobilization of financial resources made the Republic one of the first fiscal-military states.

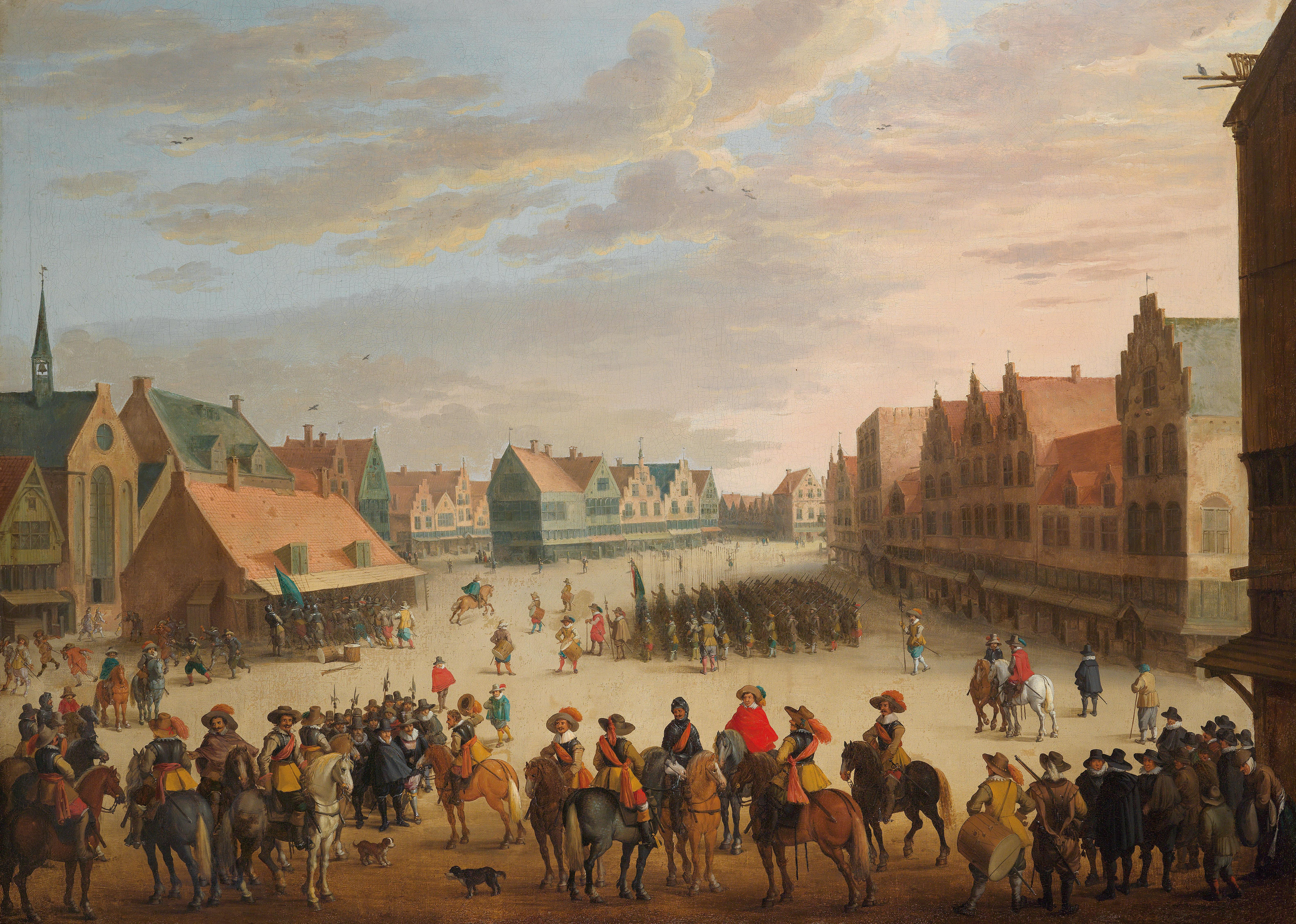
Prince Maurice of Orange dismissing mercenaries in Neude Square in Utrecht on 31 July 1618.

After 1588 the financing of the war expenditures of the Republic was put on a new organizational footing. In the Union-of-Utrecht treaty defense of the Union was indicated as one of the main functions of the federal republic. Though every participating province retained certain prerogatives (like reserving the supreme command of its forces for its own stadtholder), in practice they agreed to pool their resources and pay a fixed quota of the cost of the army establishment. This establishment was enumerated in the so-called Staat van Oorlog (probably best translated as "statement of war") that "repartitioned" the cost of regiments and companies to the several provinces. This statement was drawn up periodically by the Council of State (not to be confused with the present-day Dutch Council of State, though it was a predecessor of the latter), an advisory organ of the States-General that was charged with a number of military-administrative functions. It is often mistaken for the annual "war budget" of the Republic, but this function was actually performed by the "General Petition," also drawn up by the Council of State on the basis of the Staat van Oorlog, and presented to the States of the individual provinces after being approved by the States-General. The provinces ideally remitted their contributions to the paymasters of the army, but in practice especially the inland provinces were tardy in this respect, which often forced Holland (already burdened with paying a share of 58%) to advance even these payments.

Though the allocation of a regiment to a certain province did not imply that that unit was a private army of that province, there were often close ties between such a unit and the paying province, especially as far as the appointment of commissioned officers was concerned. Though such appointments were usually made by the captain-general of the army (except when there was no such functionary, as during the First Stadtholderless Period), the States of the provinces usually presented him with a list of three nominees to choose from. In other respects (garrisoning of fortresses, provisioning of troops, even movement of troops) there often were tensions between the provinces and the central army command over the "repartitioned" units.

The provinces were keen to ensure that their money was well spent. From Habsburg times they therefore had claimed a role in combating the fraud that was endemic in the mercenary-army system. Every province therefore had the right to muster the troops that it paid for (and if these were garrisoned together with the troops that were paid for by other provinces, those other troops also, because otherwise the fraudulent interchange of troops would be too difficult to prevent).

Another consequence of the desire to ensure that money was well-spent in military matters was the institution of field deputies. These functionaries were delegated by the States of the provinces to be near the High Command during campaigns, where they were empowered to make urgent political decisions on behalf of the States-General. Unfortunately, these deputies often interfered with operational decisions and were generally considered more of a hindrance than a boon by the top commanders. The Duke of Marlborough was especially caustic about them, when he commanded the States Army during the War of Spanish Succession, but a deputy like Sicco van Goslinga sometimes rendered useful services during that campaign.

Though in principle all troops were allocated to a particular province, in later years the States-General was sometimes forced to raise troops that individual provinces refused to pay for. These "unrepartitioned" troops had to be paid for from the limited revenues of the States-General itself, mostly the taxes it raised in the Generality Lands. As these troops became a severe burden to the "Generality," they were generally the first to be let go at the periodic army reductions, and generally not well cared for.

== Organisation ==
=== Top command ===
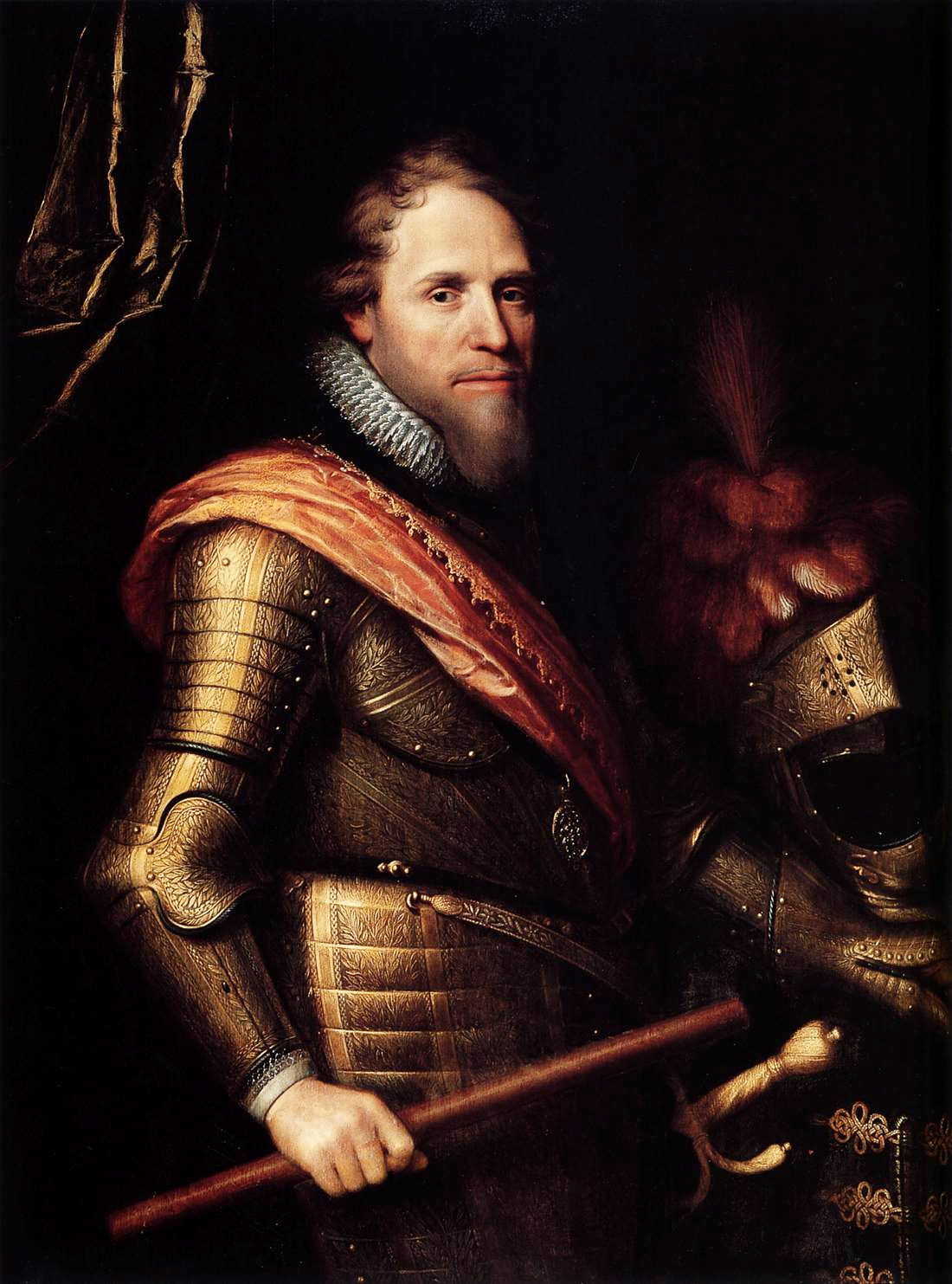
Maurice of Nassau

From the days of the Habsburg rulers the States Army inherited the structure of its top command. The commander-in-chief of the provincial military forces had traditionally been the royal stadtholder, who acted as the Captain-General. He had a deputy (in Habsburg days known as the maréchal de l'ost) who received the title of Field-Marshal. This arrangement was taken over by the Republic, even though the provincial forces were now merged into a unified federal force. As most provinces selected the same person (a member of the House of Orange-Nassau after 1586) as their stadtholder this did not lead to a divided command in practice, even though a potential conflict was present, because the province of Friesland always had a different stadtholder (and captain-general), until William IV received the appointment in all provinces in 1747.

The first two stadtholders who nominally shared the captaincy-general, Maurice and William Louis, shared the responsibilities amicably on an equal footing. Maurice's successor, Frederick Henry, was the first to be appointed as Captain-General (and Admiral) of the Union in 1625, in which capacity he outranked his Frisian colleagues. The Frisian stadtholder William Frederick did not even receive a separate command during Frederick Henry's lifetime.

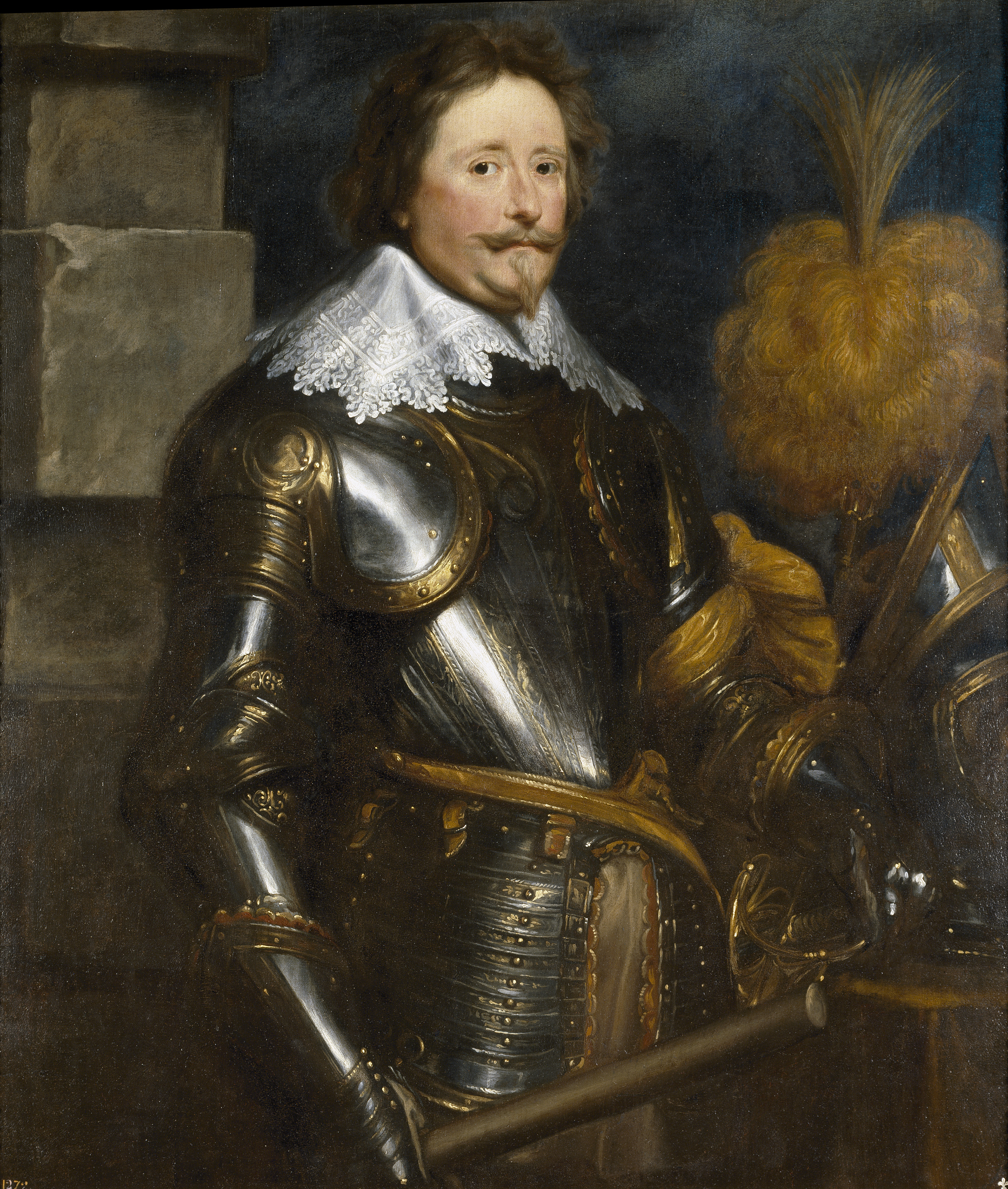
Frederick Henry

Things became awkward during the periods when a number of provinces refused to appoint a stadtholder (Friesland always had a stadtholder during these periods). During the First Stadtholderless Period the function of captain-general of the union was simply left vacant until the end, in 1672, when William III was appointed, at a moment when he was not yet a stadtholder. In this period the supreme command of the army was first entrusted to the Field-Marshal who was in office at the death of William II in 1650, Johan Wolfert van Brederode. But after his death in 1655 even this function was left vacant, because it was politically awkward for the States of Holland to appoint either of the candidates for the function, the Frisian stadtholder William Frederick, or John Maurice, Prince of Nassau-Siegen. Henceforth the States Army usually had two Field-Marshals, and after 1689 for a short time even three (when Henry Casimir II, Prince of Nassau-Dietz was appointed to the function; he resigned, however, when he did not receive the appointment of first Field-Marshal after the death of Waldeck in 1692).

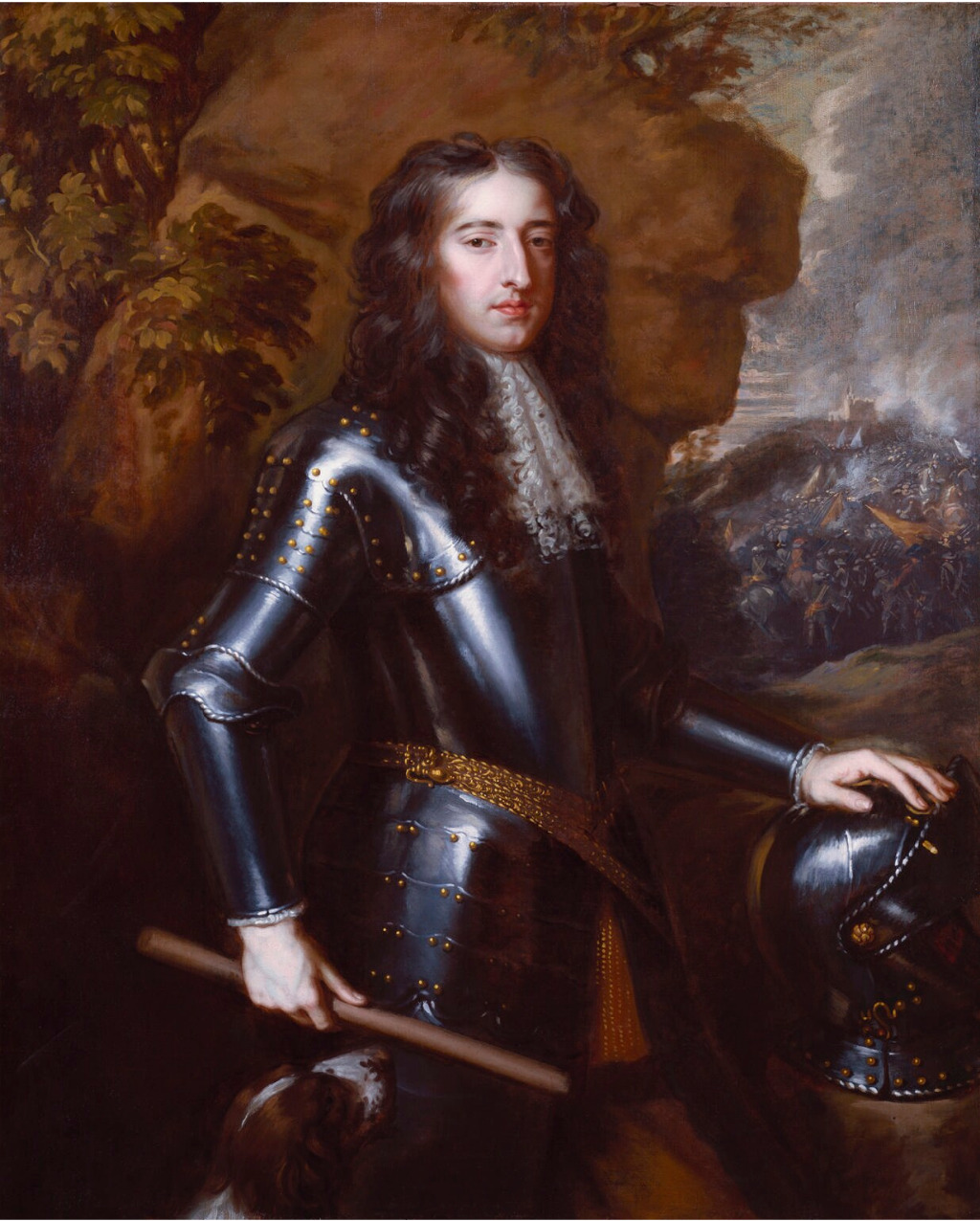
William III of Orange

After the death of William III and the beginning of the Second Stadtholderless Period the States-General appointed the Duke of Marlborough as Captain-General of the States Army (though they pointedly gave him the title of lieutenant-captain-general to avoid hurting sensibilities in Orangist circles). After the British government dismissed the Duke of Marlborough and concluded a separate armistice with France, in 1712, Prince Eugene of Savoy was appointed lieutenant-captain-general of the Union for the remainder of the War of the Spanish Succession. The function again remained vacant afterward, until the appointment of William IV, Prince of Orange to stadtholder of all the provinces. After his early death Duke Louis Ernest of Brunswick-Lüneburg held the position during the minority of William V. In this entire period the position of Field-Marshal was occupied by a succession of sometimes foreign generals of the States Army, of proven competence, like the already mentioned Waldeck, Nassau-Ouwerkerk, and the Earl of Athlone. The Duke of Brunswick was field-marshal before and after his tenure of the captaincy-general.

Below the top command there were a few top positions in the first years of the existence of the army that differed from the later organisation, though they later evolved into the more familiar positions, like the generaal van de vivres (quarter-master general), and the master-general of the artillery, and the general of the cavalry. The other field officers already had their modern titles.

=== Organisational structure ===
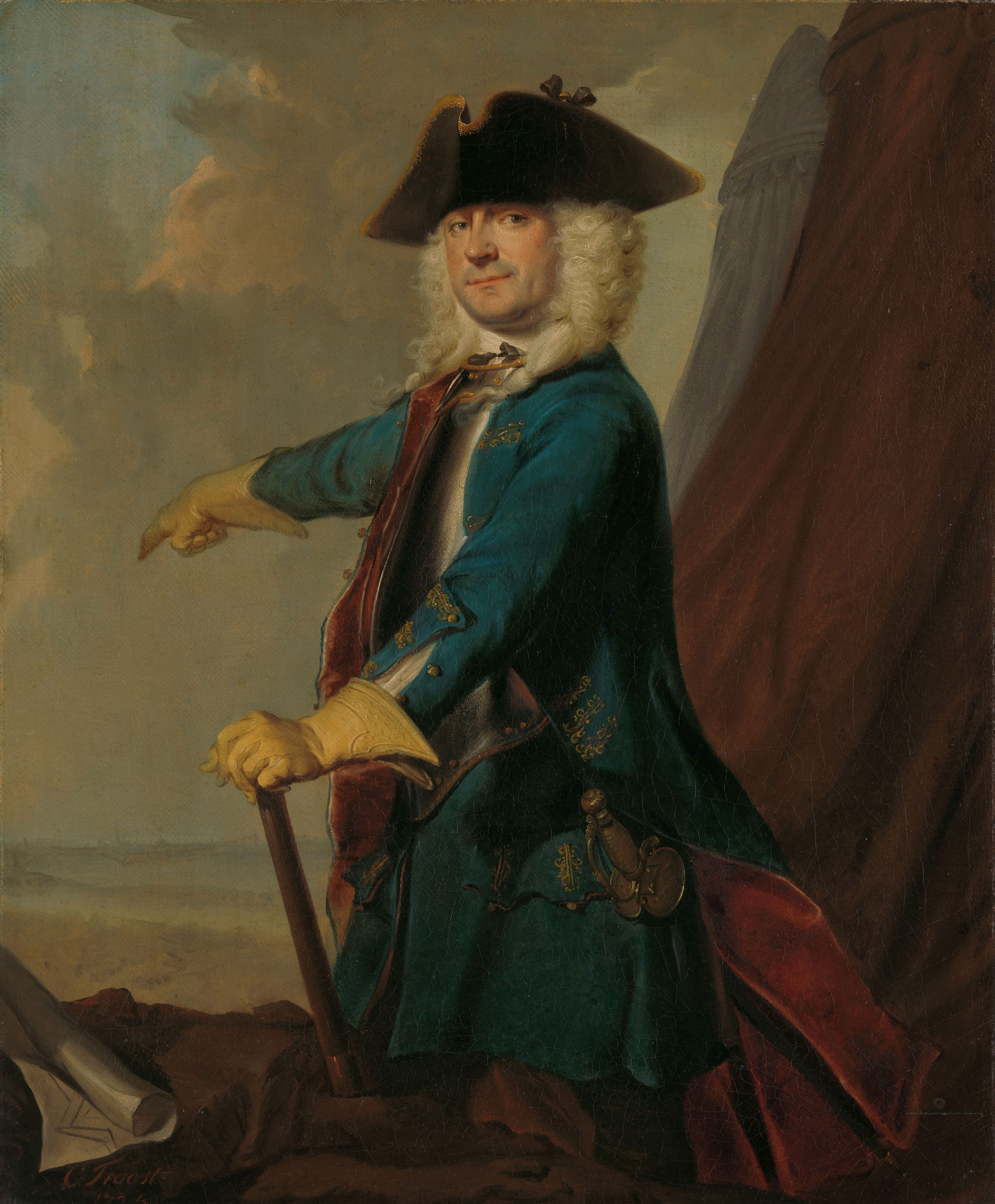
A Dutch officer in 1725, by Cornelis Troost

The basic unit of the States Army was the company of foot (called a vendel) or of horse (called a vaan). This was commanded by a Captain (Ritmeester in a cavalry company), who was assisted by a Lieutenant and an Ensign (infantry) or Cornet (cavalry) as commissioned officers. The infantry company was generally divided in four sections, called esquadres or corporaalschappen, under command of a corporal assisted by a lanspassaat (lance corporal). These functions and titles differed from the usual Landsknecht-organisation. They were introduced by William the Silent in his reforms after 1572. In this organisation the weifels of the Landsknecht organisation were replaced by two Sergeants, who were in charge of drilling the troops in fighting techniques.

Other non-commissioned officers at the company level were a quarter-master, two drummers, a clerk and a surgeon. A cavalry company had beside the three commissioned officers a quarter-master, two trumpeters, a clerk and a blacksmith. The size of the infantry company varied: at different times it had 200, 113 or 89 men. Larger companies often had their own Provost Marshal. The size of the cavalry companies also varied, between 80 and 150 horse.

The companies were often formed as part of regiments when the troops were first raised. But these regiments did not play an important organisational role. Instead, the companies were combined into "battalions" as fighting formations, in contradistinction to the Tercio of the Spanish Army of Flanders. The battalion was smaller than a tercio, but had a proportionally larger complement of firearms and used different tactics as a consequence of the tactical reforms of Maurice.

=== Recruitment ===
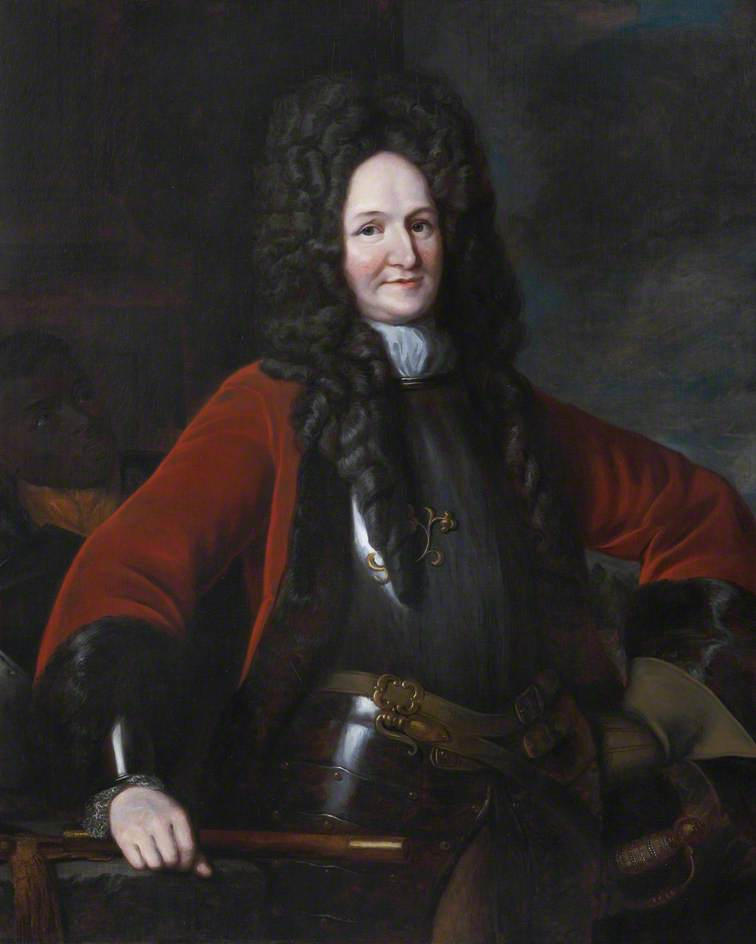
Hugh Mackay (general) was an important Scottish general in the Dutch army who served with the Scots Brigade

As in other mercenary armies of the day the raising of new troops was usually contracted out to military entrepreneurs. The States-General usually concluded a so-called Capitulatie with such a businessman, setting out the details, like the number of troops to be raised, the pay rates to be offered, the muster place, and the so-called Artikelbrief (the Articles of War governing the conduct of the troops). The entrepreneur usually took a commission himself as Colonel of the "regiment" to be raised (although the term "regiment is used loosely here, as it did not yet connote a military formation of a fixed size). Subsequently the colonel sent out recruiters to the areas where the recruiting was to take place. These advertised the opportunity to enroll by having drummers attract attention in public places. The recruiters then signed up the new recruits (sometimes offering a signing bonus, though this was risky, because many who received this absconded before entering service). The recruits were then marched off to the agreed place of first muster. During this transport they were housed and fed for the account of the company captains, who received a fixed loopgeld (literally: "marching money") for the infantry or the equivalent Anrittgelt for the cavalry.

The new recruits were concentrated at the muster place, where they were registered by the muster commissioner, a functionary of the States-General. The registration encompassed the noting down of a number of particulars about the individual recruits in the muster roll, so as to give a possibility of checking identities at future musters. After the muster the recruits swore to obey the articles of war. They then received their weapons (and in later years also their uniforms) for which they had to reimburse their captains by a deduction of their wages.

Only after this first muster the first installment of the wages was made available to the captain, who was responsible for disbursement to the men. In other words, though the States-General would have preferred direct payment to the men (and often decreed that this should take place) in practice the payment always took place through the intermediary of the captain. This may be explained by the fact that the captain also was a small businessman, who "owned" the company as a profit-making concern, but who ran large financial risks. To protect his financial interests he therefore had to make sure that the money streams to his company passed through his hands, if only because he often advanced the irregularly paid monthly wages on a daily basis in the form of "loans" to his men. This was a necessity, because the wages were often in arrears. They were supposed to be paid with a periodicity of 42 days (the so-called heremaand), but often payment was deferred and the captain had to advance the money, thereby extending credit to his paymasters. At first this financial risk made the possession of capital an informal prerequisite for becoming a captain, but later the provision of capital was taken over by so-called solliciteurs-militair ("military solicitors"), private Through this expedient the men received some pay regularly, which appreciably reduced the frequency of mutinies, certainly in comparison with the Army of Flanders.

Because the manpower potential of the Republic's territory was so limited, the States-General had to look beyond Dutch borders for a large part of the recruits. Fortunately, in those days foreign authorities did often not object to recruitment efforts within their territories (at least before the beginning of the Thirty Years' War when recruitment possibilities in Germany became more limited). The Republic therefore was able to obtain large numbers of recruits from Scotland, England, the Holy Roman Empire, France, and later also the Protestant Swiss Cantons (with whom special treaties were made for this purpose). Other than the Army of Flanders the Dutch States Army kept these foreign contingents separate in their own regiments. This had the advantage that in case of threatened mutiny one contingent could be checked by the others. The army leadership also often exploited the rivalry between these "Nations" to extract extra efforts, for instance by organizing "races" between contingents of sappers of different nationality for the first trench to reach the ditch of a besieged fortress, as happened during the Siege of Breda (1637). The downside of this policy was that sometimes epic brawls erupted between the contingents.

This recruitment policy implied that usually half of the States Army consisted of foreign troops, and in times of expansion of the army even more. The army had a Scots Brigade during its entire existence. The English regiments were paid off after they refused to swear allegiance just before the start of the Second Anglo-Dutch War in 1663. The French regiments disappeared during the wars with France at the end of the century, but were replaced with Swiss regiments for the remainder of the existence of the army. Though it is often maintained that the Republic only recruited Protestants in reality this was not a condition of employment. It was true that only Protestant chaplains had access to the army, but Catholics were allowed to enroll, and some did.

Besides this regular method of direct recruitment, the Republic occasionally used extraordinary methods. In times of emergency the army could be augmented by mobilizing the civic militias (as happened during the emergencies of 1629 and 1672), or more usefully (as the civic militia had a limited military value) by mobilizing the so-called waardgelders. These were troops hired on temporary contracts (in contradistinction with regular troops, who were hired for the duration) to perform guard duties in garrisoned cities when the regular troops were away on campaign during the summer months. But in time of emergency they sometimes were sent to the mobile army.

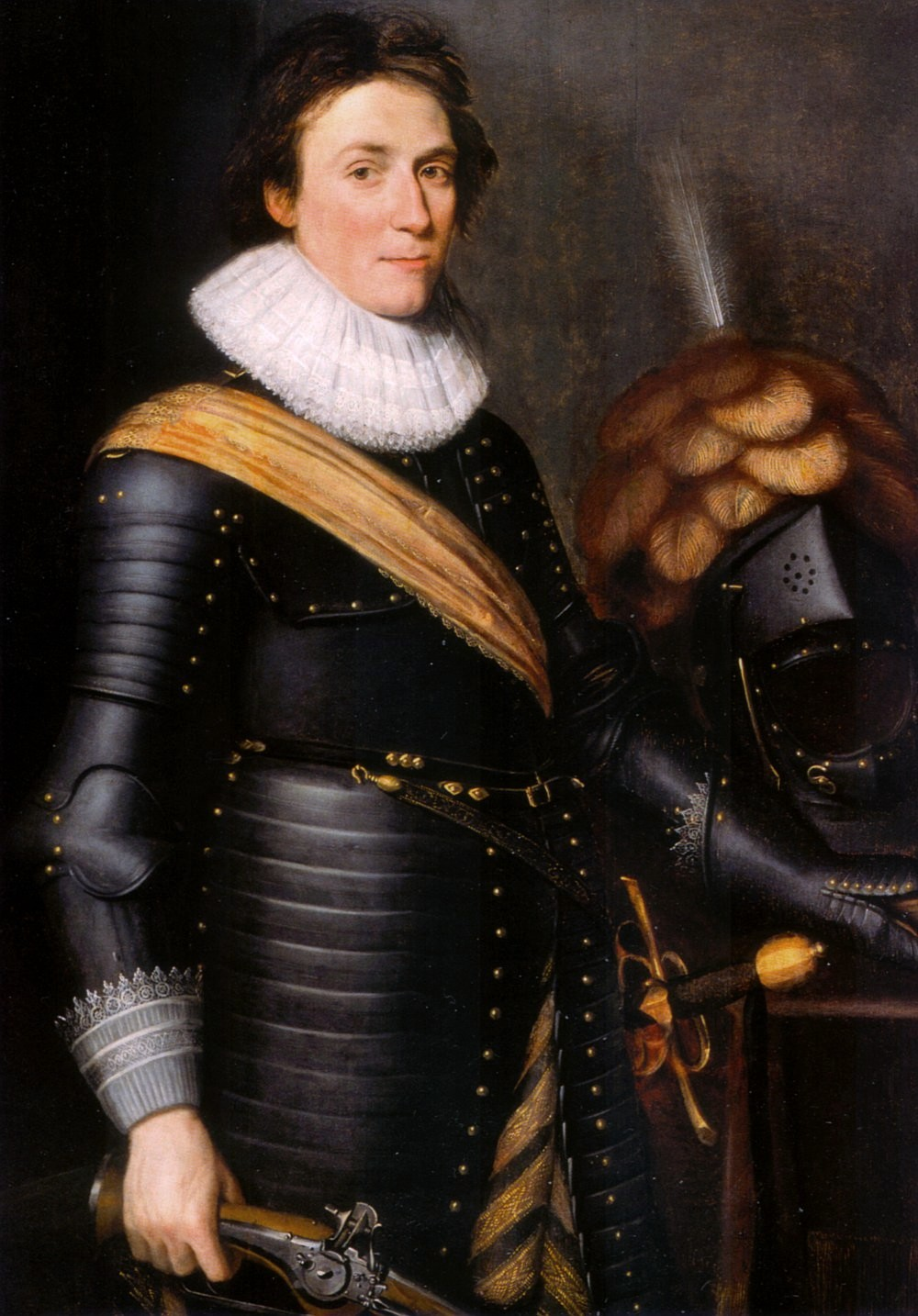
Portret of Christian the Younger of Brunswick. His army was hired by the Dutch in 1622 and together with Ernst von Mansfeld he succeeded in lifting the Siege of Bergen op Zoom (1622)

The Republic usually used military entrepreneurs only on the level of regiments, not entire armies, if only to keep control of the drilling of the soldiers and the high command of the troops. Still, there were a few instances in which entire armies were hired "off the shelf" so to speak. The best-known example is the engagement of the troops of Ernst von Mansfeld in the early 1620s, but the augmentation of the army in 1688 with Prussian troops to replace the invasion forces that the Republic sent to England to bring about the Glorious Revolution in that country may count as another (as also the employment of Danish troops in the Battle of the Boyne, though technically these were in the employ of William III as king of England).

Most curious was the employment on a temporary basis of a tercio of Spanish mutineers, who provisionally entered the service of the States-General in 1602–1604, pending the resolution of their dispute with the government in Brussels. The mutineers formally remained in Spanish service as a coherent military formation, and they did not consider themselves "defectors," but they arrived at a convenient arrangement with the Dutch during which they defended themselves against attempts by the Spanish high command to return them to obedience by force, at the same time preventing the capture of a few Dutch fortresses by the Spaniards.

Finally, in this context a form of more regular "re-recruitment" should be mentioned that in practice had some quantitative importance: the ransoming of prisoners of war. Though in the first stages of the Eighty Years' War both parties had mercilessly executed prisoners of war (a practice that continued for a long time in the war on sea), this practice was soon recognized as a waste of money, as prisoners were often ready and able to offer large sums of money to regain their freedom. The practice of ransoming had long been customary in medieval wars and there was no reason to forgo its pecuniary advantages in this conflict. Informal ransoming was soon formalized in a so-called Cartel between the high commands of the two belligerents, first in 1599, and more definitely in 1602. This cartel was a formal treaty that enumerated the rates of exchange for different grades of prisoners and other conditions of treatment (and compensation for housing and feeding). The advantage for the commanders of both armies was that the losses due to the taking of prisoners could be replenished relatively cheaply and speedily. The cartel with Spain remained in force for the remainder of the war. Similar cartels were concluded in later wars.

=== Fraud and mustering ===
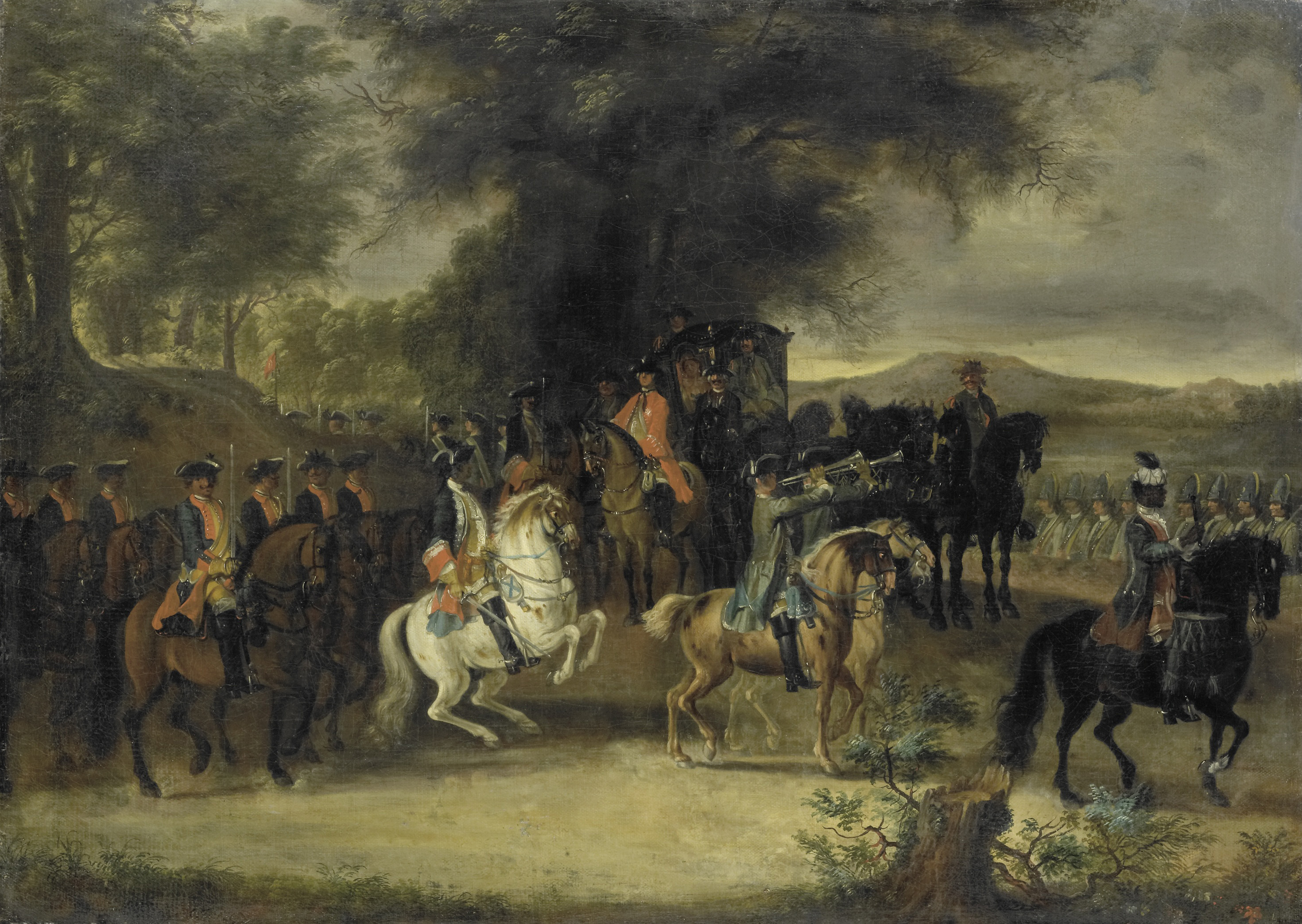
Inspection of a cavalry regiment, 1742.

As in other early-modern mercenary armies muster fraud was endemic in the States Army. This was due to the difficult position of the captains as entrepreneurs. They were paid according to the effective strength of their companies as established at the regular musters that the provinces held for the units on their repartitie. That effective strength was usually far below the nominal strength of the company due to processes of attrition, like losses due to sickness, desertion, battle casualties, including prisoners of war and missing, and "poaching" by other captains of personnel. There was little the captains could do to prevent this natural attrition process, yet they were held responsible for replenishing the ranks, generally without compensation for the extra costs. These could be substantial as the captains had to organize their own regular recruitment drives. On the other hand, the captains had little incentive to keep their units at fighting strength, because they (and their men) had little intention of actually fighting, if they could help it, so they did not see a personal advantage in keeping their units at optimum readiness. This dilemma understandably motivated them to make it appear to the muster commissioners that their units were up to strength.

The methods of fraud were well-known, due to extensive use, and received specific names in the military business. One trick was to include so-called passe-volants (the French term for this practice; in English they were called "faggots"): civilians that passed themselves of as soldiers during the muster in exchange for a small bribe. A variant of this was to "borrow" soldiers from other units for the duration of the muster, or even to poach soldiers permanently from other units. The latter subterfuge of course represented fraud on the part of the soldier also, and seemingly increased the rate of desertion at the other unit; it was called "debauchery."

To combat this fraud the authorities at first resorted to deterrence (severe punishments were threatened, though seldom imposed) and frequent inspection in the form of musters (that in principle were conducted in the same way as the original muster) to combat these abuses. But frequent musters had their own downside. In principle after every muster the troops should be paid their arrears, which was not always possible; failure to pay would present a risk of mutiny. Furthermore, the reduction of the effective strength and payments after a muster could lead to further reduction of the effective strength, because captains then often dismissed their best-paid soldiers to remain ahead in the financial game.

A better approach seemed to be to offer carrots instead of sticks. In the first place captains were given some leeway by allowing them a certain percentage of missing troops, without consequences for their payment. Also, in some cases the nominal strength of companies was lowered intentionally, at the same time keeping the amount of payments constant, thereby giving the troops a pay rise in the bargain. But the best approach would be to have the government take over the entrepreneurial risks of the captain. However, this did only happen in the Republic in the reforms of William III after 1672.

== Tactical reforms of the late 16th century ==
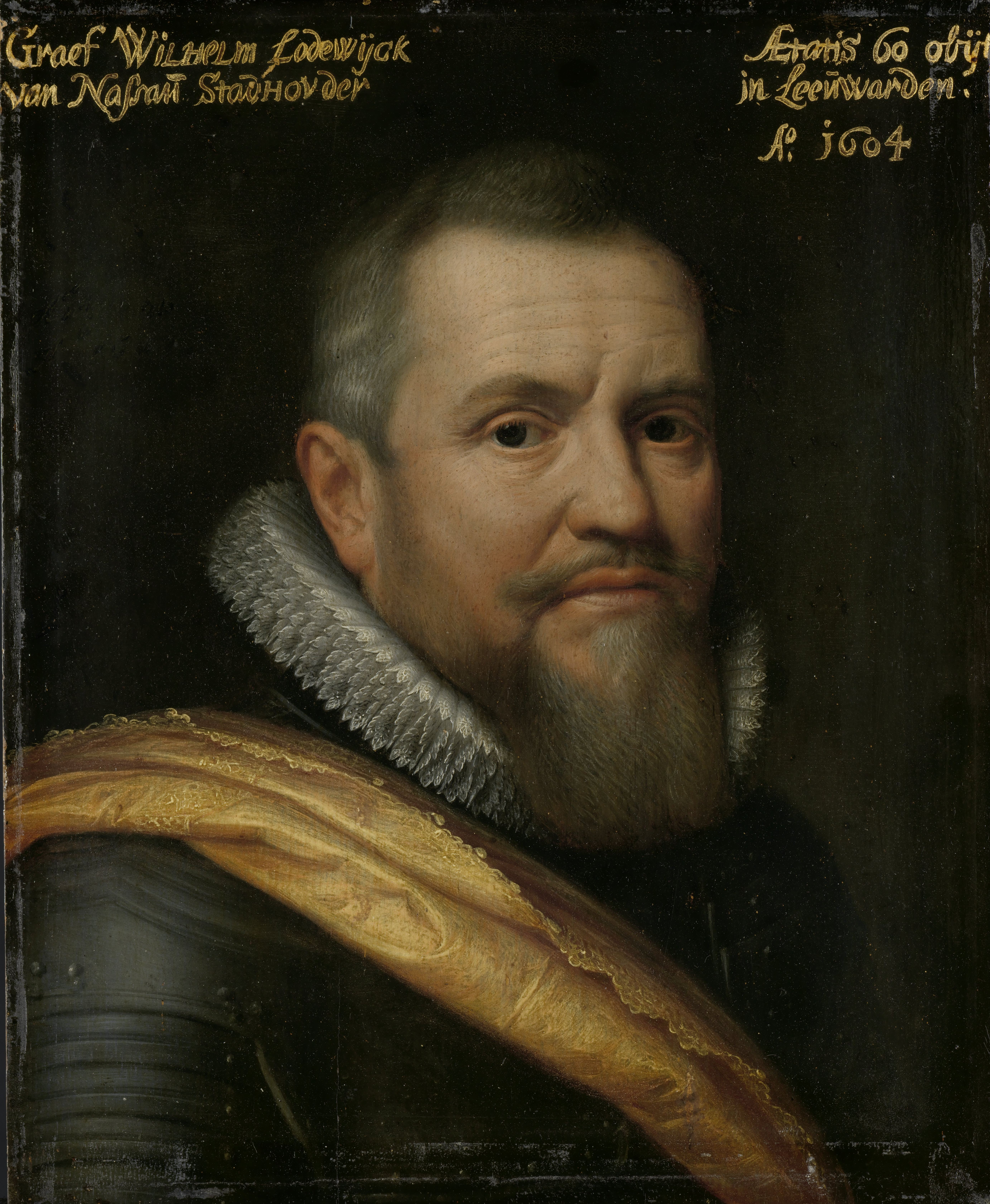
William Louis, Count of Nassau-Dillenburg

In the years after 1590 the cousins William Louis and Maurice of Nassau, stadtholders and captains-general of Friesland and Groningen, respectively the remaining provinces, introduced important tactical reforms that would be copied by other European armies, thereby engendering a tactical Military Revolution in the first half of the 17th century. The problem they tried to solve was that the lack of uniformity in armaments and tactical skills of the mercenary formations they hired on the open market made coordinated fighting difficult. In addition the dominant tactics of the time had been developed by their opponents, the Spanish commanders, and these favored the Spanish troops (who were well-drilled in them) over their imitators. What they needed was a new tactical conception that addressed the weaknesses in the Spanish tactics. Starting in 1596 they introduced a number of reforms that addressed both problems.

First of all, they changed the relative preponderance of polearms over firearms. Henceforth a company of 119 men would have 38% pikes, 25% muskets, and 37% wheellock arquebuses, compared with the old formation that had more than 50% polearms, like pikes and halberds. Because the wheel locks were deemed unreliable, by 1609 the arquebuses were phased out and all firearms were to be muskets. In the cavalry the lancers were after 1596 replaced with cuirassiers and arquebusiers, both armed with firearms.

The loss of pike men potentially diminished the defensive capacity of the company, as the rate of fire of firearms was slow, and musketeers needed to shelter in the safety of the squares of pike men when they were reloading. To counter this problem the important tactical invention of volley fire by ranks was introduced, combined with the ancient concept of the counter-march, already used by the Roman legions. This combined manoeuvre had the musketeers deploy in blocks of five or more ranks and nine files, in which the ranks successively fired their weapon simultaneously. After discharging its weapon the first rank would turn right, turn the corner of the block-formation and march to the rear, where it would start reloading, while the new first rank fired a volley, and so on. This tactic enabled the unit to sustain a relatively rapid rate of fire of sufficient "density" to discourage a charge by the pike men of the opposing square. The manoeuvre had to be executed in a disciplined way, however, to avoid confusion in the ranks, especially as the enemy was not sitting idly by. It therefore had to be drilled into the soldiers. And this drilling of the tactical manoeuvre was one of the mainstays of the reform. It required an attendant organisational reform, because the education of recruits now had to be entrusted to specialists, the company sergeants. At first the musketeers were placed on both flanks of a square of pike men, as in the conventional formation. But after 1609 the musketeers were placed in a continuous front before the pike men when they fired their volleys, only retreating into the safety of the pike squares when the opposing pike men, or the cavalry, charged them.

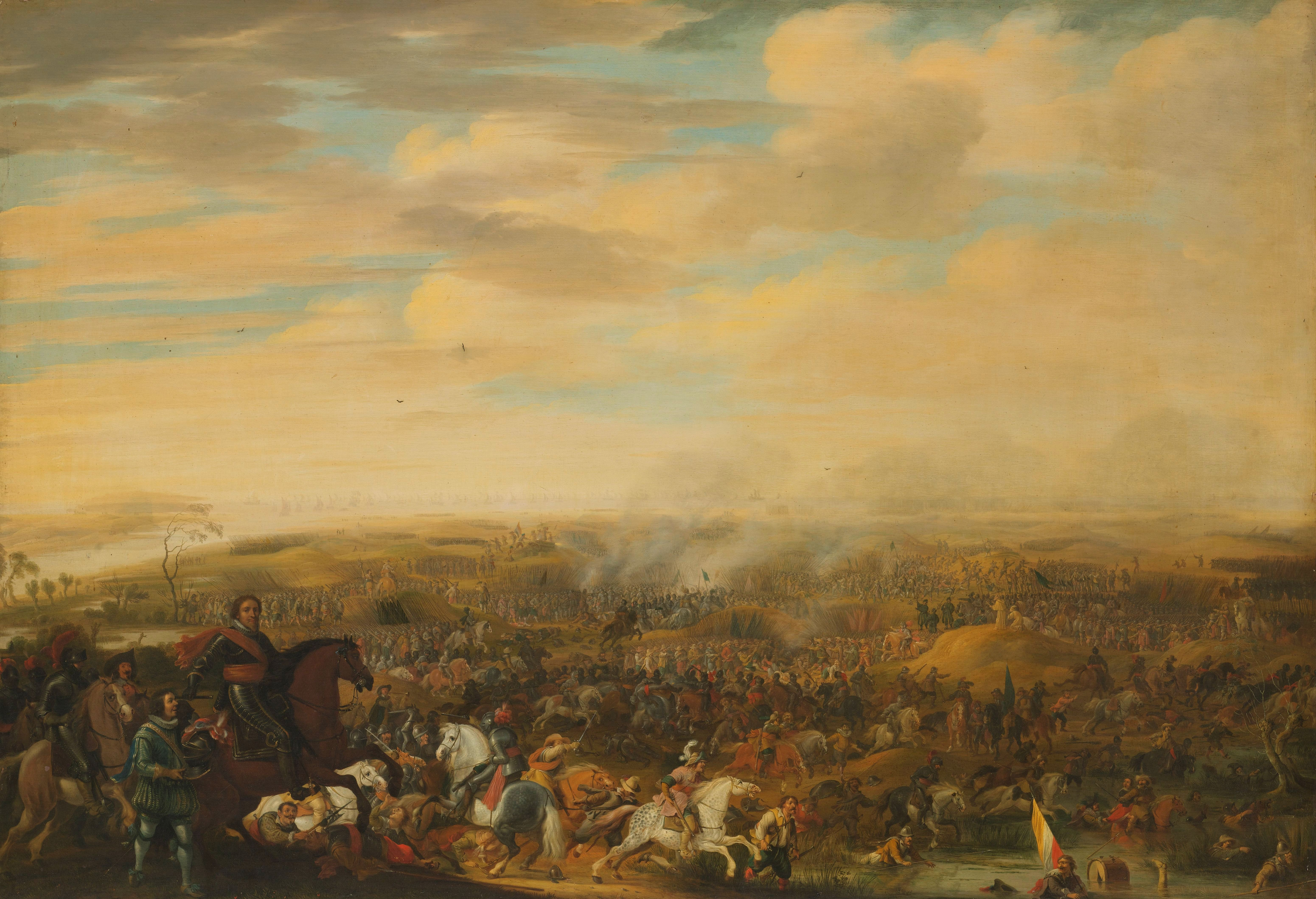
Battle of Nieuwpoort, 1600

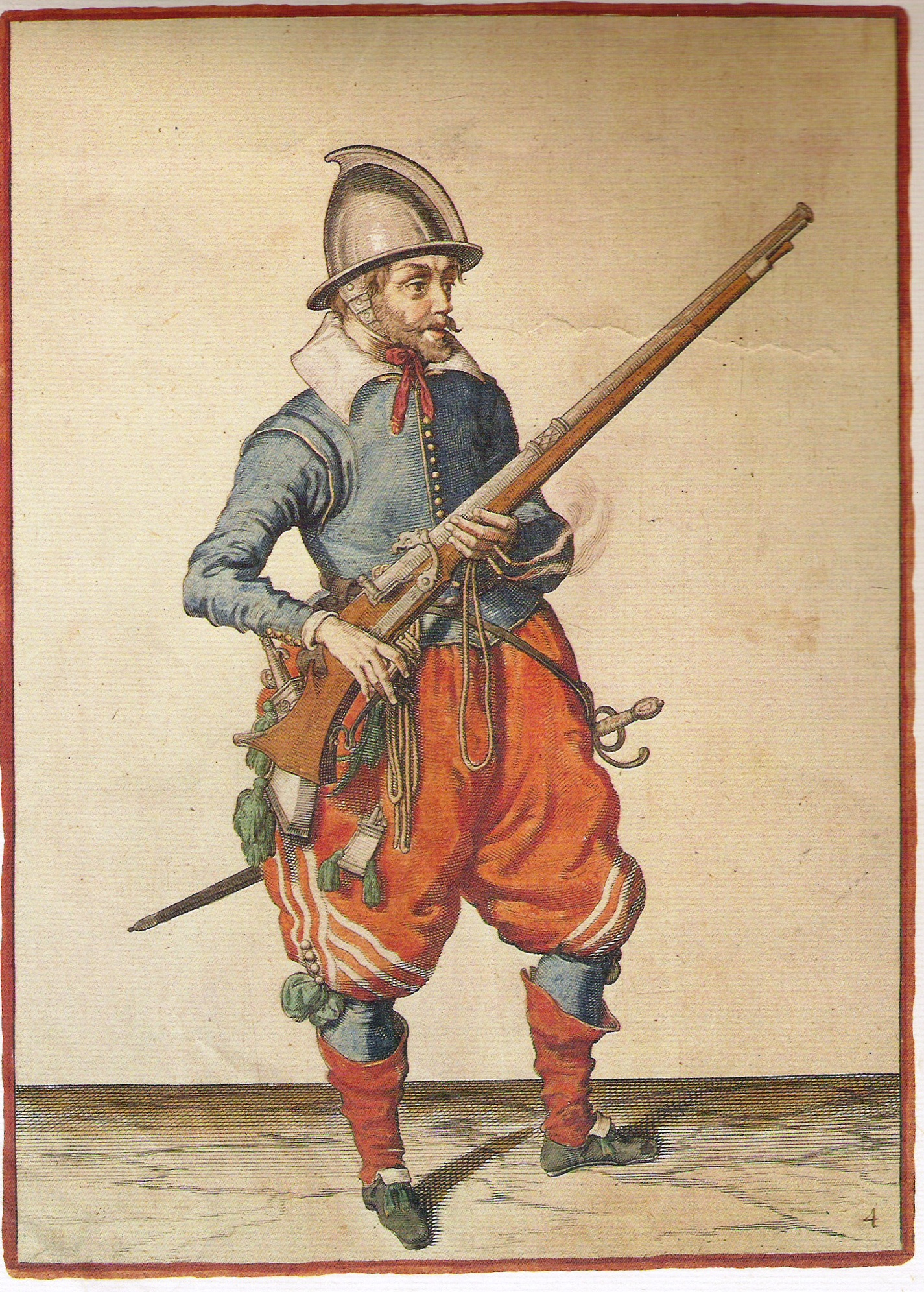
States-Army Musketeer by Jacob de Gheyn II (1608)

The linear formation of the musketeer part of the company (the pike square remained in force) was just part of the total tactical reform. Older armies had divided the total force in three parts (hence the Spanish word "tercio" for each of these parts): a van, main, and rear, which in the Spanish conception were little differentiated, though the companies were deployed in a chequerboard formation for mutual support. The two stadtholders tried to improve on this by dividing their army into tactical units of around 900 men (6 companies), called "battalions," that could operate independently. They hoped in this way to gain flexibility and spread the risk of a rout when single units broke under attack. These battalion units were deployed chequerboard-like in three lines, again for mutual support. This method of deployment enabled the commander to rotate companies in a disciplined way, again to avoid confusion. Battalions were combined to brigades as fighting formations. To achieve this tactical flexibility companies had to drill in battalion formation. All units had to drill in the same way. Furthermore, before the campaign the commander-in-chief would communicate his preferences as to the battle formation to his officers by drawing up a battle sketched plan which gave the order of battle in a standardized notation. These methods were promoted by William Louis' brother John VII, Count of Nassau-Siegen, who wrote several works about the techniques that received wide distribution in military circles in Europe. Later, drill manuals were published to illustrate the new tactics step by step, like the 1607 Wapenhandelinghe van Roers Musquetten ende Spiessen by Jacob de Gheyn II. This helped to engender a tactical military revolution in other countries also. The new tactics eventually even reached the English army, just in time for the Civil War.

Remarkably, the new techniques were only tried once, though successfully, at the Battle of Nieuwpoort in 1600, by the States Army. Maurice was not in favor of looking for open battles, as this could result in expensive losses of valuable mercenary soldiers. He preferred the steady but more secure slog of siege warfare, in which he (and his successor Frederick Henry) developed a great proficiency. The States Army therefore seldom engaged in open battles during the entire course of the Eighty Years' War, but used its field army strategically as a threatening chess piece on a chess board, often to good effect. The main war was fought with garrisons and besieging forces. The army that really employed the new tactics was that of Gustavus Adolphus of Sweden, who used them, with some improvements of his own, to great effect in the 1630s.

== Organisational reforms of William III ==
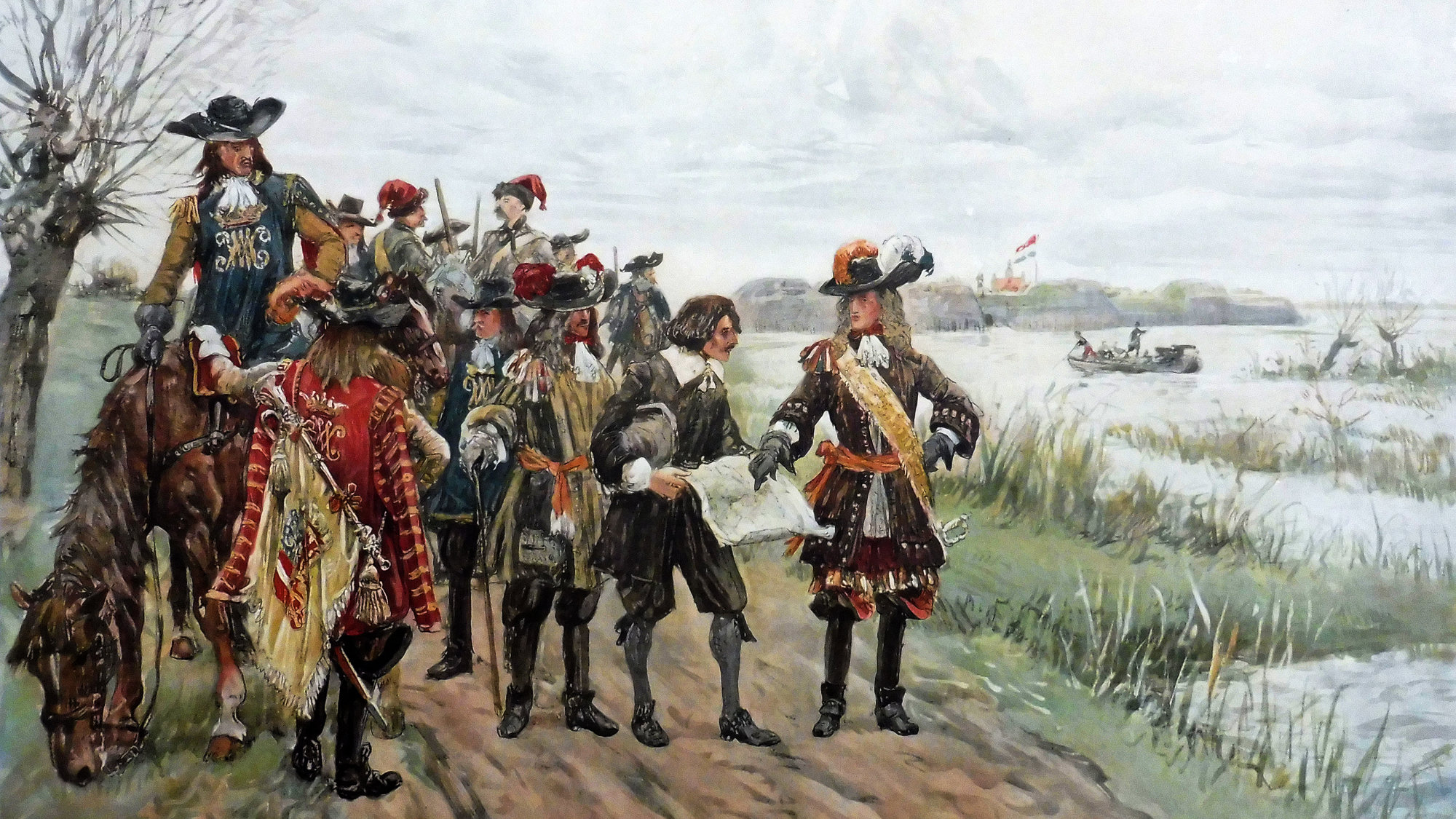
William of Orange inspecting the Dutch Waterline, 1672

Following the defeats of the States Army after the French invasion of the Rampjaar, 1672, William III introduced important organisational and logistical reforms in the States Army that enabled it to recover in a remarkably short time, and to drive the French from the country. The most direct threat to the survival of the States Army in the months after the lightning advance of the French into the Dutch heartland was a financial one: the three occupied provinces Gelderland, Overijssel, and Utrecht no longer paid the troops that were on their "repartition," which would soon have resulted in the loss of these regiments. Holland therefore agreed to temporarily take over the financing of these troops, on top of the 58% of the costs of the war that it normally already paid. But on the level of the company a different liquidity crisis threatened to ruin the captains. First of all, many "solicitors-military," afraid they would not be repaid, refused to extend further credit.

At the same time the confusion caused by the hasty retreat of the field army behind the Dutch Water Line, combined with the haphazard return of the garrisons of the Dutch fortresses that had so ignominiously capitulated to the French, caused large apparent diminutions of the effective strength of the companies that the captains had to replenish for their own account under the system described above. This threatened to bankrupt many captains, just when they were needed the most. At the behest of William III the government now stepped in to avert this danger which might have resulted in a breakdown of the army. The States of Holland agreed to compensate the captains for the loss of soldiers at a fixed rate, which enabled the captains to bring their companies up to strength again without courting financial ruin. A soldier killed in action would bring 33 guilders (later increased to 50 guilders); a trooper with his horse 150 guilders. This system was continued until the end of the Dutch Republic in 1795. Henceforth the government bore the "business risk" of war. In exchange the captains lost their entrepreneurial status and were transformed to professional officers in the modern sense, with all that entailed for tightened discipline. The advantage for the army was that its losses (for instance after battles) were much more rapidly replenished, enabling it to maintain a heightened state of readiness.

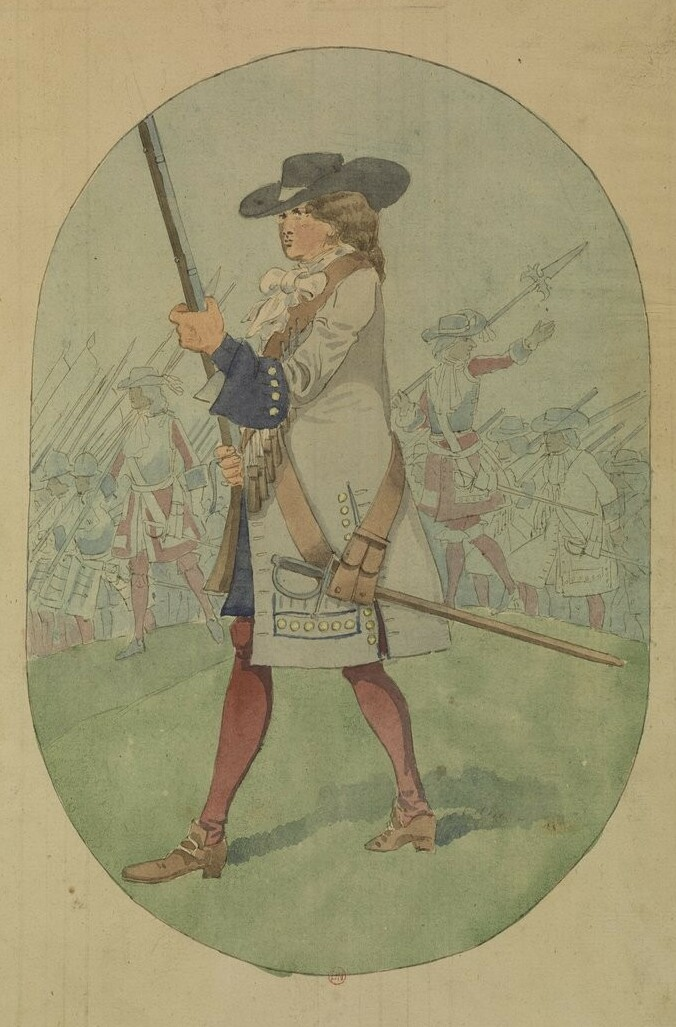
A Dutch musketeer from 1672 to 1675

Other reforms were of a more imitative nature. The reason for the lightning advance of the French army was its great superiority in numbers. An army of 125,000 French faced a Dutch field army of only 22,000. The difference in the total strengths of the two armies was not as large, as the Dutch had managed to double the size of the States Army from its peacetime strength of about 35,000 to about 80,000 in early 1672 through frantic recruitment efforts. Most of these additional troops garrisoned the many Dutch fortresses, however, which subsequently often surrendered without a fight to the French, or were simply bypassed. In any case, 22,000 was about the maximum the Dutch could support logistically in the field. The reason why the French were able to support a far larger field army was that they had developed a superior logistical system in the recent War of Devolution. Previous armies of large size, like the combined Franco-Dutch army of 50,000 that invaded the Spanish Netherlands in 1635 and subsequently almost starved, simply could not manage the strain of supplying the daily bread of the soldiers. The French Secretary of State for War Louvois had developed a system of forward supply bases, well-stocked with fodder for the horses and bread grain for the soldiers before the start of the annual campaign season. This not only kept the French well fed during the campaign in hitherto unsustainable numbers, but also allowed Louis XIV to start his campaigns while his opponents were still waiting for the grass to grow for their cavalry horses.

The Dutch government now had to make an attempt to imitate this logistical reform to be able to equal the French numbers in the field. Unlike the French, they based their system on the economic might of early-modern capitalism in the Netherlands, however. Instead of entrusting the supply of bread to government bureaucrats it was contracted out to the firm of Antonio Alvares Machado and Jacob Pereira, two Portuguese-Jewish businessmen, living in Amsterdam; these two were the leading providiteurs general, as William had them called, and the firm organised the entire process of the supply of bread to the Dutch field army from the buying of grain to the timely delivery of bread to the camps at a level sufficient to sustain the large numbers of the Dutch field armies in the subsequent wars with France through the War of Spanish Succession. This logistical support enabled William III to make his daring sortie to capture the strategic fortress of Bonn in 1673, which forced the French to evacuate the occupied Dutch provinces, because their supply lines were cut. In later years the States Army followed the French reforms in other respects also, developing its own array of supply bases in the Spanish Netherlands. This enabled the Dutch not only to match the size of the French field armies, but also to extend their own campaign season in the early Spring.

These reforms, combined with the fact that at the end of the Guerre de Holland in 1678 the organisational structure of the army was left in place, while reducing the size of the army to peacetime levels, transformed the States Army to a truly professional "standing army" for the first time.

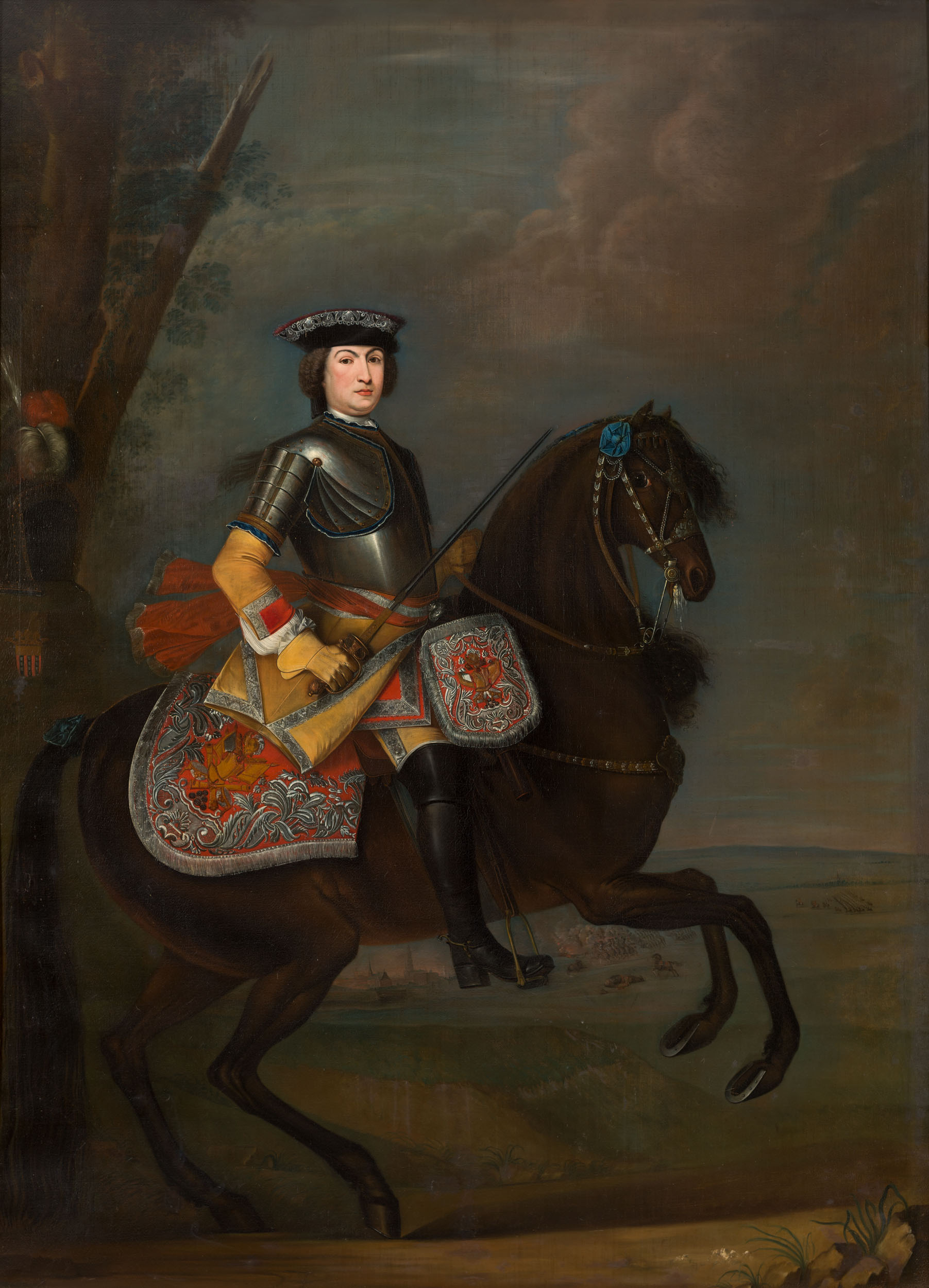
Portrait of a Dutch cavalry officer with the Battle of Ekeren in the background.

At the time of William III’s death, on the eve of the War of the Spanish Succession, the Dutch army was considered among the finest in Europe. The infantry, in particular, was highly regarded and often seen as the best on the continent. It included elite troops such as the Dutch Blue Guards, the Frisian Guards, the Scottish Brigade, and the Prince of Orange’s Regiment. The Dutch had developed platoon fire, a firing technique that gave their battalions superior firepower. Their troops were also better trained and drilled than most of their peers, allowing them to execute more complex battlefield maneuvers than either their British allies or their French opponents. Dutch soldiers became known for their composure under fire, a reputation largely due to the strict discipline enforced by their officers. British officer Humphrey Bland, who served alongside the Dutch, claimed to identify the reason for their excellence in his 1727 work A Treatise of Military Discipline:

We have a common notion, that this sang froid, or Obedient Quality in the Dutch, is owing chiefly to their Nature, by their having a greater Proportion of Phlegm in their constitution than the English… But I look upon this way of reasoning, to be a rather plausible excuse for our own neglect, in not bringing our men to the same perfection of discipline, than the product of any natural cause in the Dutch. But, allowing that nature does contribute something towards it, yet, it is evident, Art has the greatest share, since their troops are generally composed of different nations.

The Prince of Waldeck and Count of Solms played a key role in shaping this formidable infantry force.

The Dutch were equally innovative in artillery and military engineering. Menno van Coehoorn, whose fortifications can still be seen in the Netherlands today, rivaled the French engineer Vauban in his ability to both design and capture fortified towns. Besides France the Dutch Republic was the only other European power with a large and experienced siege engineering corps. While the reputation of Dutch cavalry initially lagged behind that of the infantry and artillery during the Franco-Dutch War and the Nine Years' War, it steadily improved. During the War of the Spanish Succession, the Dutch cavalry gained an excellent reputation on the battlefield. A generation of distinguished cavalry commanders, including Lord Nassau-Ouwerkerk, Count Tilly, Grovestins, and Count Hompesch, played a crucial role in enhancing the reputation and effectiveness of the Dutch cavalry.

== Highlights of its wars and campaigns ==
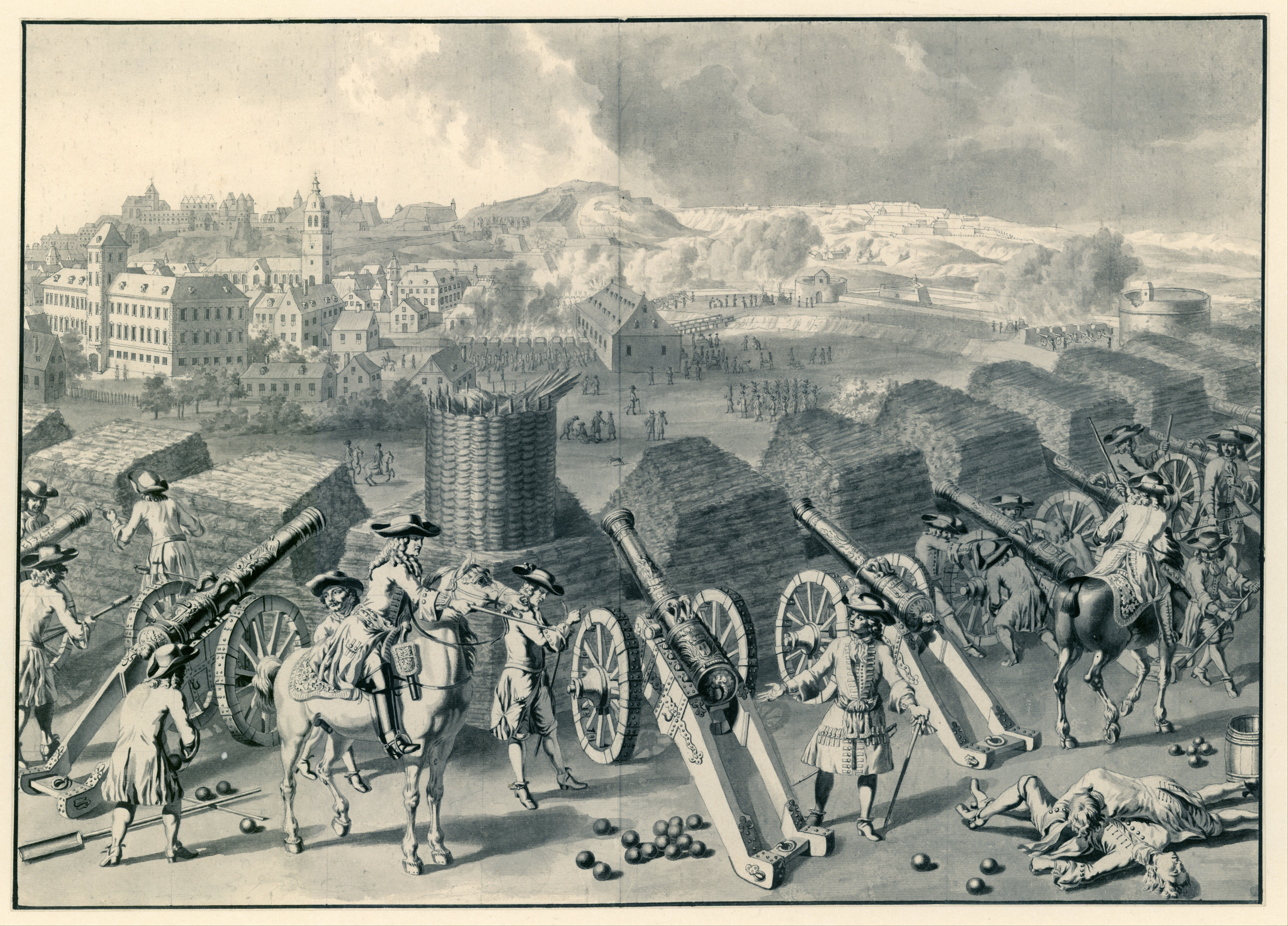
Dutch artillery at the Siege of Namur (Dirk Maas, 1695)

The States Army was instrumental in keeping the armed forces of far larger European powers, like Spain and France, at bay in a series of armed conflicts during the extended 17th century (1590–1715).

Despite the attention that the Nassauer tactical reforms attracted, both in their own time, and in the recent debates by historians of the Military Revolution, these were in practice less important than the less spectacular, but equally effective, siege-warfare methods that Maurice, William Louis, and their successor Frederick Henry employed to such devastating effect. Their methods in this respect were not as revolutionary as the organisational and tactical reforms, but they made the States Army a formidable offensive force nevertheless in the Eighty Years' War. The same applies in a defensive sense for the engineers who built the new trace italienne-type fortresses in strategic belts that frustrated would-be invaders for centuries to come.

Nevertheless, military-technical constraints of the day prevented the States Army to achieve a strategic breakthrough in the war in the Spanish Netherlands, even when the Dutch Republic entered into an offensive alliance with France in 1635. The logistical limitations to the size of field armies that kept the optimum size around 30,000 men till Louvois invented his system of forward bases around 1665, prevented the Dutch, even in combination with the French (as they tried in the ill-fated invasion of 1635), to gain a sufficient numerical superiority over the Army of Flanders to defeat that army in the field if an invasion from the east was attempted. An invasion from the north would require the patience destruction of the line of fortifications and water obstacles that the Spaniards had constructed opposite the equivalent Dutch defensive belt. And this proved again too much for the offensive capabilities of the States Army that never was able to overcome the defenses of Antwerp, the main strategic obstacle to an invasion of the Southern Netherlands from the north. The war therefore ended in a strategic stalemate between the Dutch and the Spaniards in the 1640s, though for their part the French (faced with easier terrain) made large conquests in that period.

The strain on the public finances caused by the need to support large troop levels formed a continuous motivation for the Dutch Regents to limit the resources for the army. This was a source of tension within the government of the Republic between the stadtholder and the States during the entire history of the Republic. In 1650 this tension led to a coup d'état by the then captain-general William II, one of the three times (1618, 1650 and 1787) in the history of the Republic that the States Army was used by its leader to intervene in the politics of the day. Understandably, this experience made the Regents that opposed the policies of the Orangist party, wary of an overbearing army. After William II's unexpectedly early death in the same year these Regents therefore tried to make sure that such an intervention could not recur by curtailing the army for the duration of the First Stadtholderless Period. This curtailment (and the deterioration of the quality of the army that it entailed) led to the debacle of 1672 and the rise to power of William III.

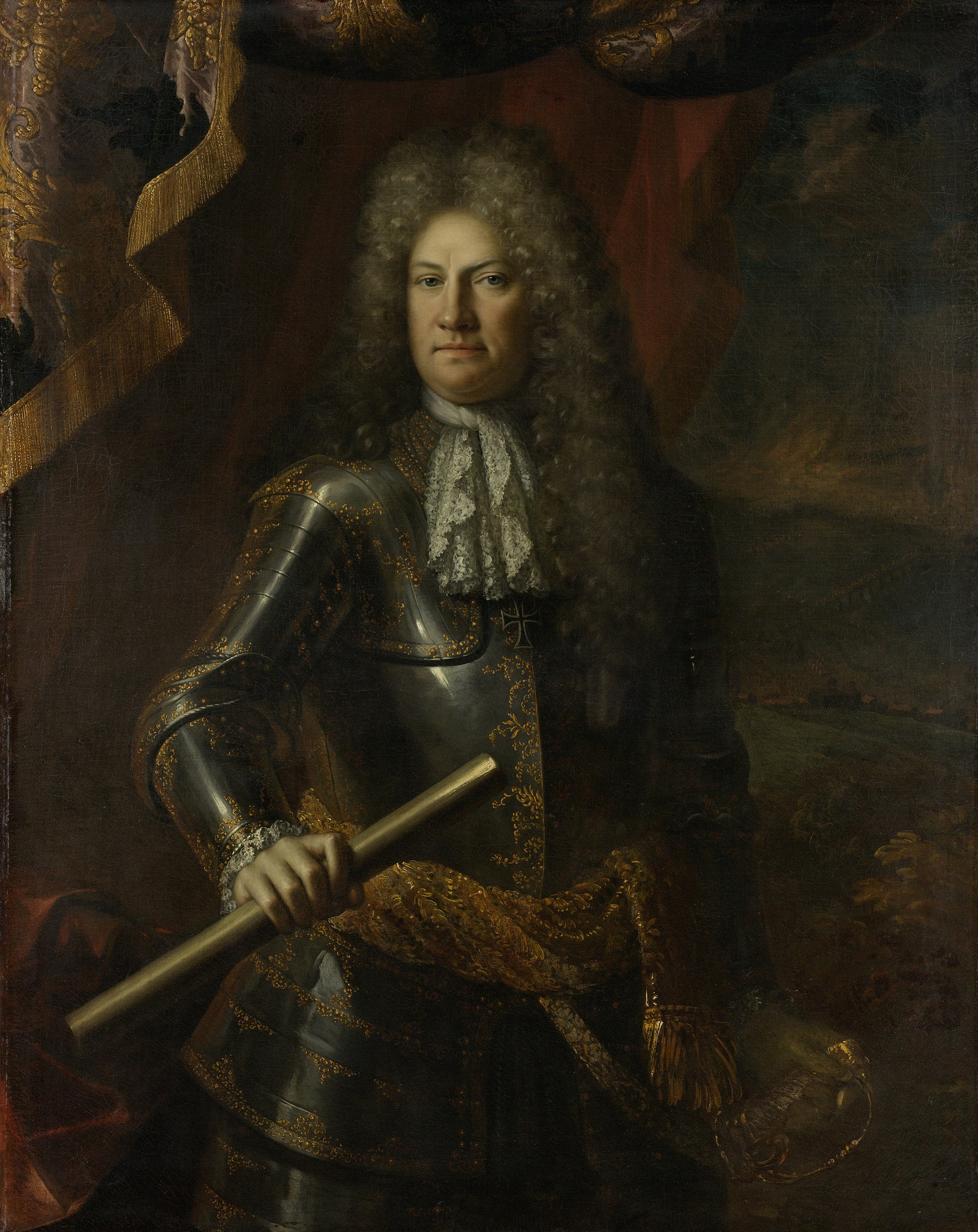
Godard van Reede defeated the Jacobite army at the Battle of Aughrim

After his death in 1702 the Regents again declined to appoint a new stadtholder (and the Second Stadtholderless Period began), but their natural inclination to again curtail the army had to be postponed till after the end of the War of the Spanish Succession. But then history repeated itself: the army was reduced in size to the absolute minimum that could still be considered safe. Because at the same time the Republic abdicated its pretensions to the status of a Great Power and embarked on a policy of neutrality, and to the fact that the Republic's hereditary enemies Spain and France for different reasons temporarily did not pose the usual threats to the Republic's existence, this did only lead to disaster in the course of the War of the Austrian Succession into which the Republic was dragged against its will due to its line of barrier fortresses in the Austrian Netherlands that made its neutrality impossible once France invaded that country. (These barrier fortresses were established after the Peace of Ryswick and reconfirmed by the Barrier Treaties of 1709–15. They allowed the Republic a sense of safety at relatively low expense, and provided the main function for the States Army during most of the 18th century:garrisoning the fortresses). The neglect of the army then exacted its toll and, as in 1672, the inevitable defeats the States Army sustained led to a popular revolution that once again brought a member of the House of Orange-Nassau to dictatorial power, this time William IV in 1747. William IV was no William III however, and besides he soon after died. The positive results of the revolution of 1672 were therefore not repeated, neither in the political field, nor the military. The Republic and its army remained on their downward course till the demise of the old Republic at the hands of the French in 1795. This was only punctuated by the Anglo-Prussian intervention on the side of stadtholder William V in 1787 (the States Army did not play a role in the Seven Years' War, because the Republic again managed to remain neutral, and the Fourth Anglo-Dutch War, because that, like the First and Second Anglo-Dutch War were exclusively naval conflicts). The swan song of the States Army was the Flanders Campaign of 1793–1795, during which it played an often unappreciated role. The establishment of the army was increased from 45,000 in 1792 to 60,000 in 1793 A veldleger (mobile army) was formed under the command of the Hereditary Prince that was sometimes successful (Siege of Landrecies (1794)), sometimes woefully unsuccessful (Battle of Menin (1793)). It all ended with the collapse of the armies of the First Coalition in January, 1795. Because the 18th century therefore remained rather dismally uneventful the interest of (Dutch) historians for the history of the States Army in that century has been limited. The standard works cited below all limit themselves to the period before 1715.

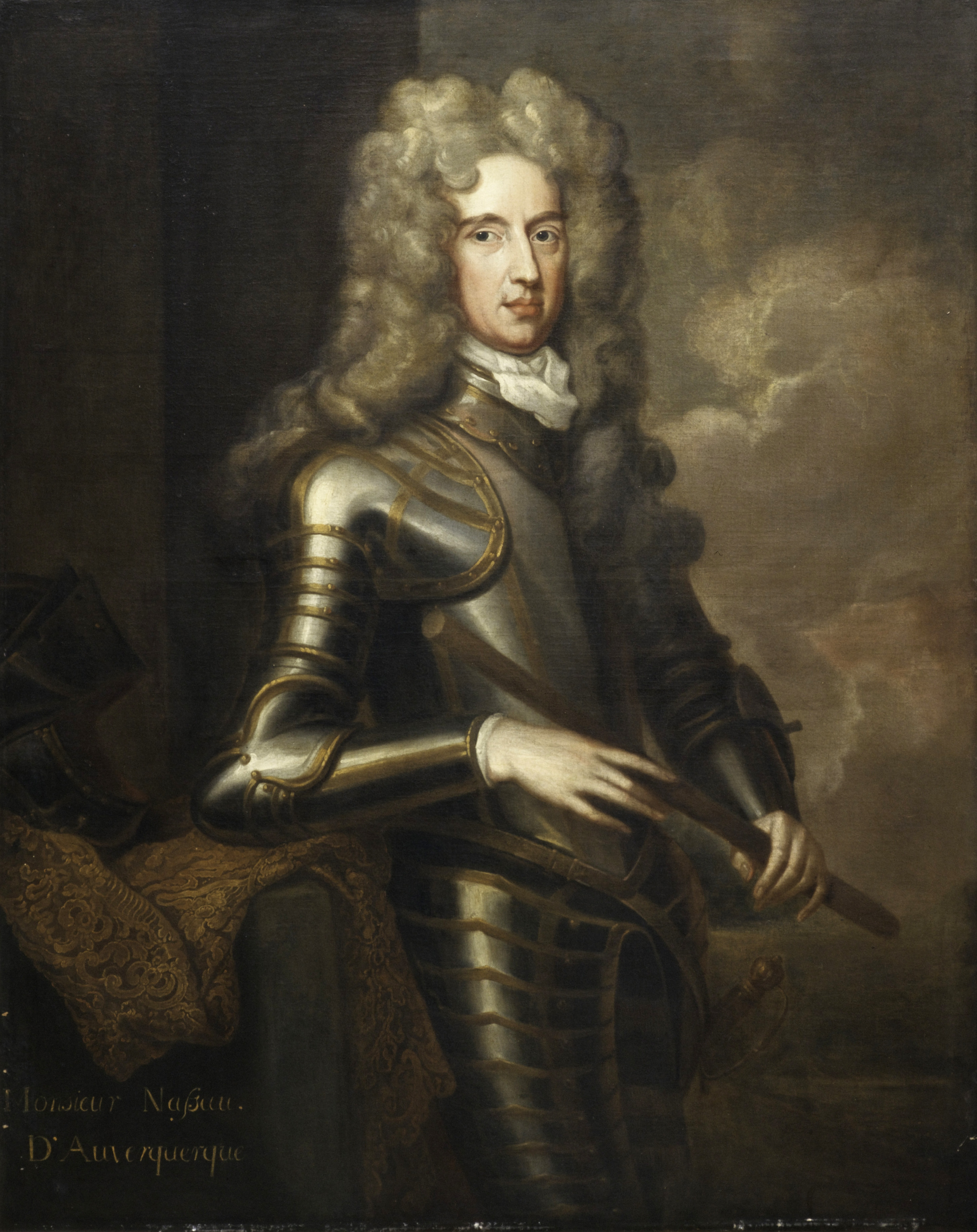
Hendrik van Nassau-Ouwerkerk led the Dutch forces during the most successful years of the War of the Spanish Succession

The period between 1672 and 1715 was indeed much more interesting. After turning the States Army around in 1672-3 William III augmented it to a formidable fighting force that arguably fought Louis XIV to a standstill as the core of forces of the alliance of Spain, the Holy Roman Emperor, and the Republic that opposed him in the Guerre de Hollande prior to the Peace of Nijmegen of 1678. Though the French army in this war remained superior, the Allies fought and sometimes won, some large-scale open battles, like the Battle of Saint-Denis (1678). Despite the fact that at the beginning of this war the Republic had almost been obliterated, it did not have to make concessions to the French at the Peace, unlike Spain that lost appreciable territory in the Southern Netherlands.

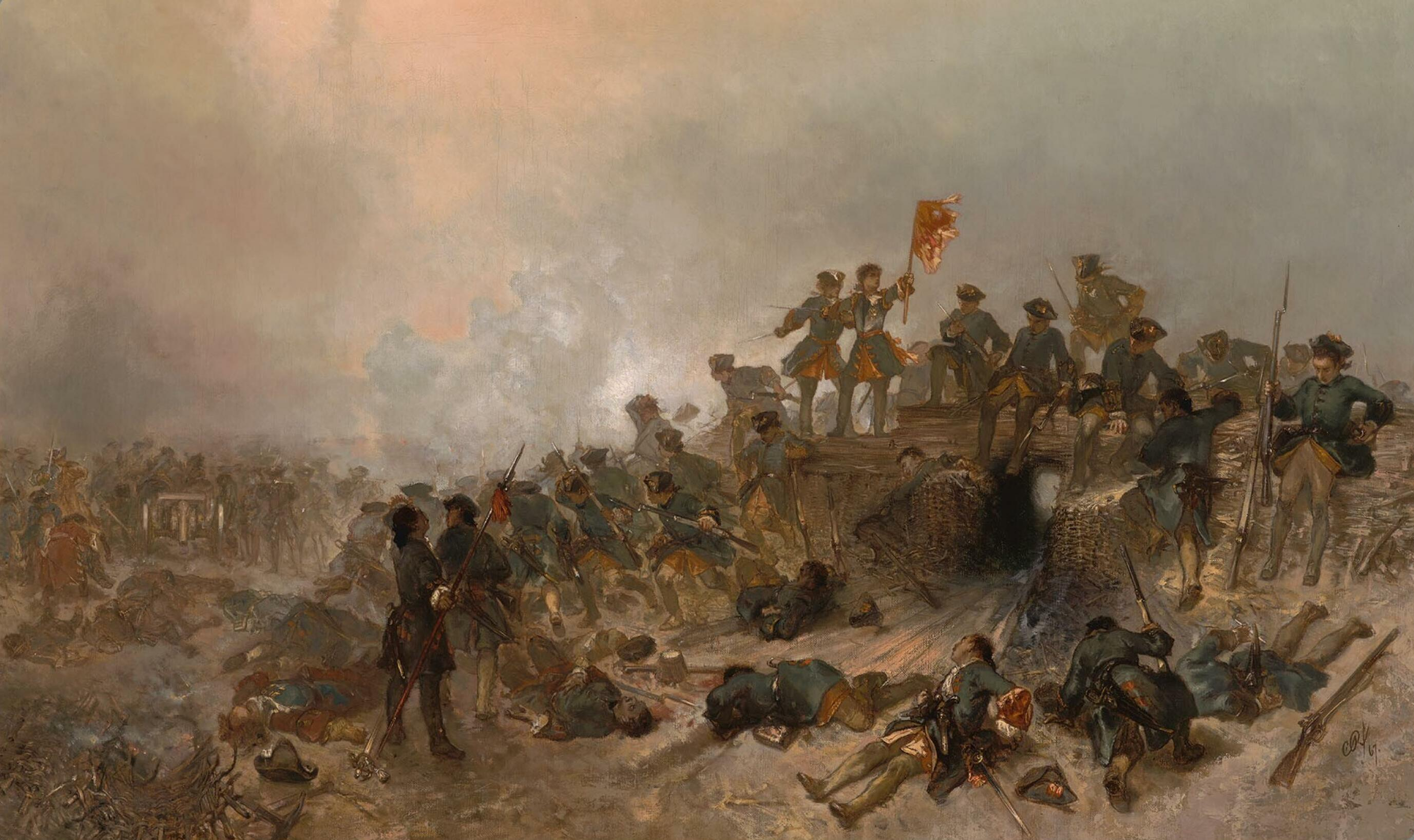
Dutch troops led by Prince of Orange storm the French entrenchments during the Battle of Malplaquet

While the Republic did not involve itself in the expansionist conflicts, like the War of the Reunions, that France fought with its neighbors in the 1680s, it was ready to respond when it felt itself again threatened in 1688. To avert a repeat of 1672 and prevent an alliance between James II of England and France, the Republic launched a preventive strike against England in 1688 that resulted in the Glorious Revolution. To illustrate the logistical advances the States Army had made since the days of the Rampjaar: it managed to double its size within the summer months of 1688 and then launch an invasion armada that was at least three times the size of the celebrated Spanish Armada of exactly a century earlier. After this successful invasion it helped William III conquer Ireland in the next few years, while at the same time keeping the French at bay in the Nine Years' War that followed. Though in this war the French were again generally more successful in the battles they fought with the Allies, they again were fought to a stalemate, as reflected in the Peace of Ryswick, that was favorable for the Republic.

Basically the same Coalition, again led by the Republic and what now became Great Britain, soon fought France again in the War of the Spanish Succession, in which the States Army reached its greatest power and size: 119,000 men in 1712. It therefore formed the backbone of the Anglo-Dutch forces in the Southern Netherlands, led by the Duke of Marlborough (while the Republic also paid for many of the troops supplied by the allied German princes and Denmark, by way of subsidies); the British contribution to most of the battles fought during this conflict were larger than they had been in previous wars. The effort required from the Republic in this war almost brought it to financial exhaustion, just as France was financially brought to its knees. This time, the armies of the Dutch Republic and its allies proved more successful on the battlefield and the States army triumphed at major engagements such as the Battle of Ramillies, Battle of Oudenaarde and the Battle of Malplaquet. But the fruits of the allied victory over France were mainly reaped by the British who made an advantageous separate peace with France. This disillusioned many politicians in the Dutch government.

== Historiography ==
Traditionally, historians have assumed that the States Army did not amount to much until 1590, that it was only under Maurice and William Louis that a modern, effective, professional army would have been made of it, and furthermore that Maurice's Dutch States Army became a model for the whole of Europe. In the 20th century, some Anglo-Saxon historians even posited that Maurice's reforms led to a "Military Revolution", although other historians then criticised and rejected this concept. Swart (2006) noted that scholars did or had done virtually no research on the organisation and development of the States Army before 1590, yet by default felt able to make a negative judgement on it.

Military branch	Number of units	Authorized strength
Foot	78 regiments	61,440
Horse and Dragoons	13 squadrons	13,075
Artillery	n.a.	n.a.
Total	--	74,515
Source:	K. k. Kriegs-Archiv 1876, p. 495;	

== Sources ==
- Bas, François de (1887). Prins Frederik Der Nederlanden en Zijn Tijd, vol. 1 (in Dutch). H. A. M. Roelants.
- Black, Jeremy (1994). European Warfare, 1660–1815. London: UCL Press.
- Dee, Darryl (2024). 1709: The Twilight of the Sun King. Rowman & Littlefield. ISBN 978-1-5381-7667-2.
- Geerdink-Schaftenaar, M. (2018). For Orange and the States: The Army of the Dutch Republic, 1713-1772: Part I: Infantry (From Reason To Revolution). Helion and Company. ISBN 978-1-911512-15-8.
- Glete, J. (2002). War and the State in Early Modern Europe. Spain, the Dutch Republic and Sweden as Fiscal-Military States, 1500–1660. Routledge. ISBN 0-415-22645-7.
- Hoof, J.P.C.M. van (2003). "Nieuwe manieren, sterke frontieren. Het bouwconcept van Menno van Coehoorn en zijn aandeel in de verbetering van het verdedigingsstelsel". BMGN: Low Countries Historical Review (in Dutch). 118 (4): 545–566. doi:10.18352/bmgn-lchr.5944.
- Lynn, John A. (1997). Giant of the Grand Siècle: The French Army, 1610–1715. Cambridge: Cambridge University Press.
- K. k. Kriegs-Archiv (1876). Feldzüge des Prinzen Eugen von Savoyen. Wien: Verlag der K.K. Generalstab, series 1, volume 1.
- Van Nimwegen, Olaf (2006). "Deser landen crijchsvolck": het Staatse leger en de militaire revoluties (1588–1688) (in Dutch). Amsterdam: Bert Bakker. p. 551. ISBN 90-351-2941-5.
- Nimwegen, Olaf van (2020). De Veertigjarige Oorlog 1672–1712: de strijd van de Nederlanders tegen de Zonnekoning [The Forty Years War 1672–1712: the Dutch struggle against the Sun King] (in Dutch). Prometheus. ISBN 978-9-0446-3871-4.
- van Nimwegen, Olaf (2010). The Dutch Army and the Military Revolutions 1588–1688. Woodbridge: Boydell Press. ISBN 978-1843835752.
- Ostwald, Jamel (2006). Vauban under Siege: Engineering Efficiency and Martial Vigor in the War of the Spanish Succession. Brill. ISBN 978-90-47-41150-5.
- Parker, Geoffrey (1972). The Army of Flanders and the Spanish Road, 1567–1659. Cambridge: Cambridge University Press. ISBN 978-0-521-08462-8.
- Parker, Geoffrey (1988). The Military Revolution: Military Innovation and the Rise of the West, 1500–1800. Cambridge: Cambridge University Press. ISBN 978-0-521-47958-5.
- Raa, F.J.G. ten; Bas, F. de; Wijn, J.W., eds. (1910–1950). Het staatsche leger (in Dutch). Breda: Koninklijke Militaire Academie.
- Roberts, K. (2010). Pike and Shot Tactics, 1590-1660. Botley. ISBN 978-1-84603-469-5.
- Stapleton, John. M (2003). Forging a Coalition Army: William III, the Grand Alliance, and the Confederate Army in the Spanish Netherlands, 1688–1697. Ohio State University.
- Swart, Erik (2006). Krijgsvolk. Militaire professionalisering en het ontstaan van het Staatse leger, 1568–1590 (PDF) (in Dutch). Amsterdam: Amsterdam University Press. p. 278. ISBN 978-90-5356-876-7. (Dissertation)
- Tracy, J.D. (2008). The Founding of the Dutch Republic: War, Finance, and Politics in Holland 1572–1588. Oxford University Press. ISBN 978-0-19-920911-8.
- Zwitzer, H.L. (1991). "De militie van den staat" : het leger van de Republiek der Verenigde Nederlanden (in Dutch). Amsterdam: Van Soeren. ISBN 90-6881-020-0.
