= Grovestins's cavalry raid =

1712 raid of the War of the Spanish Succession

Grovestins' cavalry raid
- Part of the War of the Spanish Succession
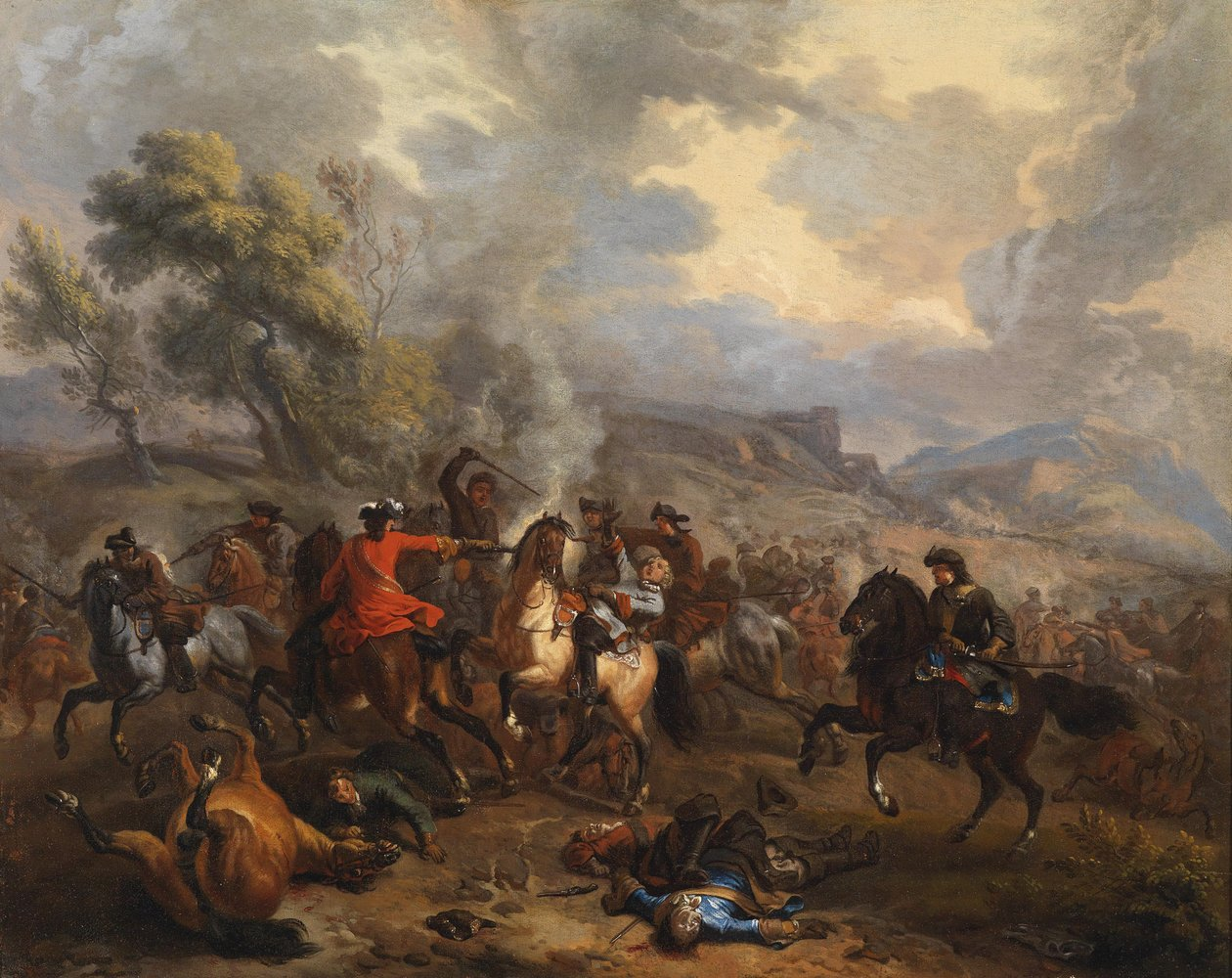
- Painting of a cavalry battle of the War of the Spanish Succession
Date	10 June 1712 – 21 June 1712
Location	Champagne, France
Result	Dutch victory

Belligerents
Dutch Republic	France

Commanders and leaders
Frederik Sirtema van Grovestins	Pomponne de Refuge

Strength
1,833	200

Casualties and losses
165 killed or wounded	Unknown

Grovestins' cavalry raid was a successful raid carried out in Champagne, France, by a Dutch States Army brigade under Major-general Frederik Sirtema van Grovestins between 10 June 1712 and 28 July 1712 during the final stages of the War of the Spanish Succession.

== Background ==
Cavalry raids were part of the strategy of petty warfare used by both sides during the War of the Spanish Succession. They were used to intentionally terrorise civilians in disputed areas or areas under enemy occupation, attack enemy supply lines and supply stores and to capture plunder to help finance the war effort. One of the forms petty warfare took was the exactions of ransoms in the form of money from municipal authorities to prevent their communities from being pillaged and burnt by raiders.

These ransoms were agreed upon in formal treaties and were usually secured by the raiders taking civilian hostages or the threat of violence in the case of noncompliance. The practice was so widespread that local authorities usually allowed affected citizens to offset the ransoms with the taxes they normally paid, as then only state governments would be affected by the lost revenue.

The motivation for Grovestins's cavalry raid was the noncompliance regarding a ransom agreed between Dutch raiders and the intendant des finances of Champagne and the Three Bishoprics in 1708. The Bishoprics claimed they owed their ransom money to the Electoral Palatinate and not the Dutch Republic, an argument which failed to persuade the Dutch. The perceived failure to pay the ransom motivated the States General of the Netherlands to order a raid in the Three Bishoprics to force the ransom money to be paid. (Note: A Resolution of the States General to that effect can be found in the Dutch Nationaal Archief.)

== Raid ==
Key locations

The raid was planned by Grovestins and authorized by Prince Eugene who was supreme commander of the Allied forces at this time. The action took place just before the Battle of Denain, that would be catastrophic for the Allied cause. (Note: Bosscha writes that Grovestins and his brigade were sorely missed in this battle.) Grovestins' brigade of cavalry of about 1800 troopers (hussars and dragoons) (Note: Grovestins gives an overview of the order-of-battle with the companies, and the regiments where they originated.) departed from the Allied camp near Le Cateau-Cambrésis in the evening of 10 June 1712, and followed the following route through the North of France: Proisy, Vervins, Crécy-sur-Serre, Neufchâtel-sur-Aisne, Suippes, Sainte-Menehould, Saint-Mihiel, Xivray, Pont-à-Mousson, Nomeny, Metz, Boulay, Trarbach, Lötzbeuren, Koblenz, Andernach, Bonn, Aachen, Maastricht, Leuven, Brussels, to finally end up in Tournai, where the Allied army was encamped after Denain, on 28 July 1712. They traveled a total of 800 km (500 miles) in 48 days.

The actual "fighting part" of the Raid took, however, only 11 days and ended on 21 June in the town of Lötzbeuren in the Rhineland-Palatinate, which was beyond the reach of the French. The remaining 37 days were spent at a leisurely pace, with a number of rest days interspersed. The first action took place on 11 June when the town of Vervins, after initially having refused entry, was persuaded to submit to the contribution, without a fight. Next day a detachment of the brigade reached Crécy-sur-Serre where the annual fair was coincidentally just being held. Hussars started looting the town, causing a panic. The population threatened armed resistance, but the colonel commanding the detachment ordered the town to be put to the torch. The looting that followed resulted in the capture of 80 fat oxen. But in hindsight the action was more of a failure, as a number of important personages, among whom the Archbishop of Reims, who had been at the fair, were able to escape, depriving Grovestins of valuable hostages.

Also on 12 June the town of Neufchâtel-sur-Aisne was reached by the main force of the brigade. Initially there was a stand-off as the inhabitants raised the drawbridge. But then the inhabitants sent out the priest to negotiate. It was agreed that the troops would be able to march unmolested through the town, with the priest as a voluntary hostage for good behavior. So the affair ended without unpleasantness. Something similar happened later in the day in Suippes, which town surrendered without a fight after intercession by the local priest, and submitted to the contribution the next morning.

On 13 June the town of Sainte-Menehould was reached which also initially appeared to be ready to offer resistance. But with a lot of threats and intimidation the magistrate was persuaded to submit after all, and to give up a few hostages. The next day the territory of Leopold, Duke of Lorraine, who was considered friendly to the Dutch, was reached. To avoid endangering these good relations Grovestins ordered his troops to be on their best behavior, and not to harm the people in any way. When near St. Mihiel a trooper disobeyed this order, he was summarily executed as an example. (Note: Actually, four troopers were guilty of misbehavior and were initially all condemned to death. But in an act of decimation the four were forced to cast dice to select the one who actually was shot.)

In St. Mihiel Grovestins was received with great honors by the local governor and after a few hours of exchanges of pleasantries the brigade passed through the city without incident. In Xivray a messenger of the Duke promised assistance with revictualling and the brigade marched peacefully on until on 15 June the Moselle was crossed again without incident at Pont-à-Mousson. The same day Nomeny, was reached where the Selle was crossed.

On 16 June the brigade reached the heights of St. Barbe, overlooking the fortress city of Metz. The acting governor of Metz, (Note: Nominally Villars was military governor of Metz at the time, but in his absence the lieutenant-general the Marquis de Refuge commanded the fortress.) the Marquis de Refuge, let his troops man the Covertway, and opened fire on the Dutch with his cannon. Grovestins therefore first tried to negotiate, sending a parlimentaire, which led to an exchange of polite, but threatening, letters, but not to the desired result. Grovestins thereupon posted a blocking force on the road to the fortress city of Verdun where a large French force was known to be present. Next he sent a detachment of hussars to torch the suburbs of Metz. Other detachments did the same to the surrounding countryside where several chateaus and villages were put to the torch. The French garrison had to look on, powerless to do anything about it, as several sorties were easily repulsed by the Dutch. The main Dutch force remained on St. Barbe, where a number of local landowners came by to ask for Safe conduct, which was in all cases granted. The troops that were stationed in Verdun (about 1200 troopers in three detachments in Grovestins estimation (Note: Quincy speaks of 4000 horse and eight regiments of dragoons that Villars had sent out under generals the Marquis de Coigny and the Comte de St. Fremont.)) the whole day made no attempt to intervene. When the detachments that Grovestins had sent out to pillage and burn returned that evening they brought a large number of hostages and rich booty. That day 18 castles and 35 villages were destroyed in the countryside around Metz. (Note: The governor of Metz ordered an inventory of the damage from the magistrats of the afflicted villages. See for a detailed inventory from the village of Vantoux Le Pays lorrain, 1911.) After these depradations the brigade left St. Barbe in the evening without having been molested.

On 17 June the brigade reached the Saar. The river was flanked by a number of redoubts, intended to prevent its crossing. Grovestins summoned the nearest one to keep quiet, and the garrison agreed, so that the Dutch vanguard could start fording the river. The current was strong, and only got stronger when the governor of the fortress at Saarlouis had the sluices opened. But that night the crossing was successfully concluded. The next day the 25 soldiers in the redoubt that had agreed not to open fire the previous day, opened fire anyway, which led to a number of losses. But the withering fire the Dutch returned soon put an end to this. The brigade then continued along the Hunsrück, giving Saarlouis a wide berth. The commander of Saarlouis sent out strong patrols to reconnoiter, but these left the Dutch unmolested. After two more days (one of which they used to rest up) they reached Lötzbeuren (Note: In this town the about 300 hostages that had been taken during the raid were handed over to the brigadier d'Abbady on 21 June.) on 21 June.

They amassed a large amount of war booty and new "contributions" on the way. On the other hand, Grovestins had about 40 villages put to the torch without mercy, to follow up on the threat of brandschatting that had been ignored by the French Intendant. (Note: Quincy reports with some grim satisfaction that the French peasants didn't take these depredations lying down, and that numerous stragglers of the force were captured or worse by them.) Meanwhile, the threat of the expedition was even felt by king Louis XIV himself, who even appears to have considered moving from Versailles to the safety of Chambord when the panic was greatest.

The Dutch losses were relatively light: 165 men and 359 horses. (Note: Quincy estimated the Dutch losses higher. He writes of 200 stragglers who were killed, often by irate peasants, or otherwise disappeared.)

== Aftermath ==
Following the raid Grovestins was ordered to take up the governorship of the fortress of Bouchain again, where he soon was besieged by Villars. He was forced to surrender and made a prisoner of war. The French so admired his conduct, however, that Villars allowed him to be paroled and to travel back to the Dutch Republic for three months, after which he returned to comfortable imprisonment. The raid itself was avenged by Jacques Pastur who between 24 and 28 August 1712 conducted his own cavalry raid to the Generality Lands of the Dutch Republic with 1500 dragoons, where he also took hostages to enforce his own contributions, imposed on the North Brabant countryside, and put the town of Tholen to the torch in retaliation.

== Sources ==
- Bosscha, J. (1868). Neerlands heldendaden te land van de vroegste tijden af tot op onze dagen (in Dutch). Vol. 2.
- Dop, P van (2018). Aller à la Guerre!La petite guerre tijdens de Spaanse Successieoorlog (in Dutch). pp. 17–22.
- Grovestins, Lieutenant-generaal van (1850). "Journaal van de Coursen, gedaan in de laatste Campagne, anno 1712". De Vrije Fries: jaarboek (in Dutch). Vol. 5. Meijer & Schaafsma. pp. 256–276.
- Quincy, Charles Sevin de (1726). Histoire Militaire Du Règne De Louis Le Grand, Roy De France, Oú L'On Trouve Un Détail De toutes les Batailles, Sieges, Combats particuliers, & generalement de toutes les actions de Guerre qui se sont passées pendant le cours de son Regne, tant sur Terre que sur Mer: Enrichie Des Plans Nécessaires; On Y A Joint Un Traité Particulier de Pratiques et de Maximes de l'Art Militaire (in French). Vol. 7. Denis Mariette.
- Van Lennep, Jacob (1880). "Twinstigste hoodstuk". De geschiedenis van Nederland, aan het Nederlandsche Volk verteld [The history of the Netherlands, told to the Dutch nation] (in Dutch). Vol. 3. Leiden. pp. 276–291.
- Wijn, J.W. (1964). Het Staatsche Leger: Deel VIII-3 Het tijdperk van de Spaanse Successieoorlog 1711–1715 (The Dutch States Army: Part VIII-3 The era of the War of the Spanish Succession 1711–1715) (in Dutch). Martinus Nijhoff.
