= Pomponne de Refuge =

- Born: 27 October 1651; Paris
- Died: 26 September 1712 (aged 60); Metz
- Military career
- Allegiance: Kingdom of France
- Branch: Infantry
- Service years: 1667 – 1712
- Rank: Lieutenant general
- Commands: Fortress of Charlemont; Franche-Comté; Three Bishoprics; Metz
- Conflicts: War of Devolution; Siege of Charleroi (1667); Siege of Tournai (1667); Siege of Douai (1667); Siege of Lille (1667); Franco-Dutch War; Siege of Maastricht (1673); Battle of Seneffe; Siege of Philippsburg (1676); Siege of Maastricht (1676); Nine Years' War; War of the Spanish Succession; Siege of Hombourg; Grovestins' Cavalry Raid
- Awards: Chevalier de Saint-Louis

Pomponne de Refuge, full name: Alexandre Pomponne Eustache de Refuge, Marquis de Refuge, also referred to as the Marquis de Refuge, (Paris, 27 October 1651 (Note: Baptism in Saint-Eustache, Paris) – Metz, 26 September 1712) was a French official and military officer who played an important role in the France of king Louis XIV in the War of Devolution, the Franco-Dutch War, the Nine Years' War and the War of the Spanish Succession. He founded a military academy when he was governor of the Fortress of Charlemont. He ended his career as commander of the fortress of Metz and the surrounding area.

== Life ==
=== Personal life ===
De Refuge came from a family that had supplied many members of the French Noblesse de Robe. But he chose a military career, becoming a member of the Noblesse d'épée like his father. He was the son of Claude de Refuge, Seigneur d'Arcueil (who in turn was the son of the diplomat Eustache de Refuge and grandson of Pomponne de Bellièvre) and of Anne Marie de Berziau, Dame de Maisse. He married Anne Françoise d'Elbène around 1677 and they had the following surviving children: Madeleine de Refuge (1680), Marie Anne de Refuge (1685), Henri Pomponne de Refuge, Marquis de Refuge (1686), Marie Charlotte de Refuge (1687). His wife died on 14 September 1712 in Metz and he himself 12 days later on 26 September 1712 also in Metz. They are buried in the Cathedral of Metz His epitaph reads: "Hic jacel Vir illustrissimus Pomponius de Reffuge, cui Ludovicus magnus, œquus virtutum œsiimator, Olim commuerai Carolomontum gubernandum; Ducendos et vice regiâ, exercitus; Sobilem ad arma juventutem instituendam; In comitatu Burgundiœ, intra trium episcopatum Fines militare imperium. Hœc digna recepit virtutis bellicœ prœmia. Vir inter belli duces expertissimus, intemeratâ probitate pirecellens, Deo et Régi Sine fuco, sine fastu Addictissim us . Obiit Métis, die 26 septembres, anno 1712. Abi, viator, Et laudes quas ultra meruit et hoc marmo silet piis pro Mo precibus compensa". (Note: Translanslation:Here lies the most illustrious man, Pomponius de Refuge, whom Louis the Great, who was the master of virtues, had once agreed to let govern Charlemont; to lead a viceroyalty; he would like to train youths in arms; In the county of Burgundy, within the borders of the three episcopates, he led the military government. This worthy received the rewards of military prowess. A man most experienced among the generals of the war, exceedingly upright in integrity, devoted to God and the King without shame, without pride. He died on the 26th of September, in the year 1712. Go, wayfarer, and make up the praises which he has already earned and the pious silent prayers for him with this marble.)

=== Career ===
De Refuge began his military career in 1667 as captain of a company of the Regiment de la Reine. He served in the War of Devolution in that year and took part in the sieges of Charleroi, Tournai, Douai, and Lille. After he was invalided out in 1668, he was appointed Lieutenant-du-Roy (governor) of the Bailiwick of Évreux in 1670, after his brother gave up the post. Next he was commissioned as a captain in the Regiment o0f Bourgogne in 1672 at the start of the Franco-Dutch War. In 1673 he became colonel of the Regiment of Bourbonnais. He led the regiment in the Franco-Dutch War, and took part in the following battles and sieges: Maastricht in 1673, Seneffe, Dinant, Huy, Philippsburg, and was wounded at the second Siege of Maastricht (1676). In that year he was promoted to brigadier. In 1685 he became governor of the Fortress of Charlemont. He started a military academy in that place. In 1688 he was promoted to Maréchal de camp. In 1693 he was made a Chevalier de Saint-Louis. (Note: De Refuge commissioned a portrait by Hyacinthe Rigaud at this occasion, which was completed in 1695. Current location unknown.) In 1696 he was promoted to lieutenant-general des armées. In 1703 he became Commander of the Franche-Comté, and in 1704 of the Three Bishoprics.

In July 1705 he was ordered to lay siege to the fortress town of Hombourg. He took the corps of the Marquis de Conflans, consisting of 15 battalions of foot and 15 squadrons of horse, and drew siege artillery from Metz and Saarlouis. With them he conducted the Siege of Hombourg successfully, obtaining its capitulation on 27 July 1705 after only four days. After that he took on Trier where he demolished the fortifications.

In 1712 he was acting governor of Metz when that fortress city became the target of Grovestins' Cavalry Raid. He bravely defended the city on the 16th of June 1712, but was unable to prevent the depradations of the Dutch troopers on the surrounding countryside.

Pomponne de Refuge suddenly died three months later in Metz, on 26 September 1672.

== Publications ==
The Duke of Saint-Simon relates in his Mémoires that Pomponne de Refuge was a walking repository of genealogical information. He appears to have anonymously published:

- Armorial et Nobiliaire de l'Évêché de Saint-Pol-de-Leon, en Bretagne, en 1443.

== Sources ==
- Bégin, E.A.N.J. (1843). Histoire & description pittoresque de la Cathedrale de Metz, des eglises adjacentes et collegiales (in French). Vol. 2. Lithographie de Verronnais. pp. 35, 63, 460.
- Chesnaye des Bois. François-Alexandre Aubert de La (1786). Dictionnaire de la noblesse, contenant les généalogies, l'histoire et la chronologie des familles nobles de France (in French). Vol. 15. Vve Duchesne. pp. 408–409.
- "Alexandre Pomponne Eustache de Refuge". Geneanet (in French).
- Grovestins, Lieutenant-generaal van (1850). "Journaal van de Coursen, gedaan in de laatste Campagne, anno 1712". De Vrije Fries: jaarboek (in Dutch). Vol. 5. Meijer & Schaafsma. pp. 256–276.
- Stėphan Perreau. "REFUGE Pomponne de". Hyacinthe-rigaud (in French).
- Pompone Marquis de Refuge (1863). Pol de Courcy (ed.). Armorial et Nobiliaire de l'Évêché de Saint-Pol-de-Leon, en Bretagne, en 1443 ... Deuxième édition publiée avec une introduction et des notes par Pol de Courcy (in French). Paris: Chez Auguste Aubry.
- Quincy, Charles Sevin, marquis de (1726). Histoire Militaire du Règne de Louis-le-Grand, Roi de France (in French). Vol. 4. Paris: Denis Mariette.
