= Jacques Pastur =

Spanish Netherlands military officer (1659–1723)

- Born: 12 June 1659; Waterloo, Spanish Netherlands
- Died: 3 May 1723 (aged 63); Waterloo, Austrian Netherlands
- Spouse(s): Anne Marie Du Tomboy; Jacqueline Delle
- Military career
- Allegiance: Kingdom of Spain; Kingdom of France
- Branch: Cavalry
- Service years: 1691-1720
- Rank: Maréchal de camp
- Conflicts: Nine Years' War; War of the Spanish Succession; Battle of Ramillies; Siege of Tournai; Rhine campaign of 1713

Jacques Pastur, chevalier de Saint-Lazare (Waterloo, 12 June 1659 (Note: Date of baptism) – Waterloo, 3 May 1723) was a Southern Netherlands officer who fought on the Allied side in the Nine Years' War and on the French side in the War of the Spanish Succession and reached the rank of Mestre de camp. He was especially active in petite guerre actions, where he earned great renown with cavalry raids.

== Life ==
=== Personal life ===
Pastur was born the son of Gérard Pastur, farmer, and Marie Wits. (Note: Bapt. Jacobum, fil. Gerardi Pastur et Mariae Wits conjug. susceptum a Dom. Jacobo Cottereau per Jacobum de Housta et Joanna de Post.) He married first Anne Marie Du Tomboy, and after her death, Jacqueline Delle. From the first marriage, he had the following children: Philippe, Louise and Marie; from the second marriage the following children: Maximilien-Honoré, and André.

=== Career ===
==== In Spanish service ====
Pastur received a commission as a captain to raise a company of Walloon infantry on 8 October 1691 (he was already a former ensign at this time), charged with protecting the Sonian Forest in the service of the Governor-General of the Spanish Netherlands, Maximilian II Emanuel, Elector of Bavaria. (Note: Maximilian at this time led the Spanish Army of Flanders as an ally of the Anglo-Dutch army in the Spanish Netherlands in the course of the Nine Years' War.) The company consisted of the captain, a lieutenant, a quartermaster, four sergeants, four corporals, and 192 soldiers. He did this for his own account (he would receive most of the war booty), though the army would pay for the arms and uniforms, and the upkeep of the company.

On 4 June 1693, Pastur (by then a major) took a company of marauding Swiss mercenaries in French service, prisoner in the Sonian Forest, after they surrendered without much of a fight. The French army under Marshal Luxembourg personally camped in the Forest and committed many depredations that year.

In July 1694, the Spanish army under Maximilian personally camped near Neereisse and Hoeilaart in the vicinity of the Forest. They attracted numerous French reconnoitering and marauding parties that entered the Forest. Pastur intercepted a number of those and took them prisoner in the following months. He was wounded in the arm in one skirmish. In another he drove a large French force from the Forest, in which action he had two horses killed under him. For his bravery he was promoted to "Sergeant-Major" (Note: I.e. a major in modern terms) in the Walloon Infantry by Maximilian on 22 November 1694.

On 20 June 1695, at the head of a company of Dragoons, he drove a large contingent of French infantry and Hussars from the village of Ixelles with hardly any losses on his side. The French kept sending raiding parties. Maximilian decided to try and put an end to it in December 1695 by putting several garrisons in the Forest. This was initially successful against the French partisans based in Mons. But on 27 April 1696, Pastur was wounded in the left arm during an action he took to liberate several Swiss officers in Allied service, who had been captured by the French partisan Henri, who was based in Charleroi, near Tombeek. The action was successful, but Pastur was hors de combat for several months.

By then, he had again been promoted for his exploits, as the Spanish king on 15 April 1696 made him a Mestre de camp. He received command of a regiment of three companies of dragoons and mounted musketeers. With this force he executed a number of raids on the enemy in the Fall of 1696. On 31 May 1697, he attacked a superior force of French partisans in the Sonian Forest, and liberated a number of Allied soldiers they had taken prisoner, while chasing the French beyond Waterloo, with only very light losses on his own side.

In October 1697, the Peace of Ryswick ended the War. This ended Pastur's service soon after.

==== In the service of the "Deux Couronnes" ====
After the death of king Charles II of Spain in 1700, he was succeeded by the French prince Philip of Anjou as Philip V of Spain. This meant that Governor-General Maximilian of the Spanish Netherlands continued under a new sovereign. (Note: The fact that the new king Philip belonged to a different Royal House was constitutionally irrelevant. The Southern Netherlands retained the same constitution as when they were called the Habsburg Netherlands. The king of Spain happened to be the "overlord" of the numerous feudal entities that constituted the country, and he united them in a personal union in his capacity of Duke of Brabant, Count of Flanders, etc. etc. The transition from the reign of Charles II of Spain (Charles IV of Flanders) to Philip V of Spain (Philip VII of Flanders) therefore happened in the same way as the transition of Philip IV of Spain to Charles II of Spain had happened. All regional stadtholders and local rulers could remain in place; they only had to swear allegiance to a new sovereign. The same went for the Governor-General, though Philip could have replaced him with another candidate. But he did not.) Before long Philip's reign was contested by a Habsburg pretender, the Archduke Charles who styled himself "Charles III of Spain." Charles was supported by the same Grand Alliance that had fought France in the Nine Years' War. This resulted in the War of the Spanish Succession which began in 1701. The Southern Netherlands soon again became a theater of war. As the Spanish forces in the Southern Netherlands were now part of the pro-French alliance between France and Spain, they were deemed to be in service to the "Deux Couronnes", but formally separate from the French forces that also (in this case peacefully) entered the Southern Netherlands.

We find Pastur as colonel of his own regiment of dragoons at a troop review at Nivelles on 16 October 1702 (so a few months after the start of the War of Spanish Succession). His regiment was part of the army commanded by Villeroy, that on 26 June 1704 fought a skirmish with seven Dutch squadrons of horse near Tongerlo. He was severely wounded during this skirmish, but despite the entreaties of his officers he refused to retreat. He was so weak that he almost fell from his horse. That horse was eventually killed under him. But he managed to escape capture.

In August 1705, he became part of what could be called the "First Battle of Waterloo". (Note: Van Dop refers to it as "the Action of Overijssche") He had been ordered to observe the enemy forces under the duke of Marlborough who, after the Battle of Elixheim had penetrated the Lines of Brabant, and on 17 August 1705, attacked the forces of Villeroy and Maximilian at Waterloo in force. Pastur's regiment of dragoons was posted in the Sonian Forest, together with a few French regiments. The Allies attacked around 18 hours. Overwhelmed by superior numbers, Pastur had to beat the retreat. The enemy tried to take him in the flank and the rear in the forest, but Pastur easily evaded this trap, and fought a delaying action, unleashing a murderous fire on the English and Dutch forces pursuing him. This not only convinced the enemy to give up the pursuit, but they even gave up the village of Waterloo that they had captured. Pastur managed to capture more than 100 enemy prisoners in the abandoned post, on top of the heavy losses he had inflicted on the enemy during the battle.

The battle meanwhile continued in the morning of 18 August 1705, as the Allied army under Marlborough and Nassau-Overkirk marched through the Sonian Forest to the vicinity of the Groenendael Priory, in an effort to reach the heights commanding the City of Brussels. The Franco-Spanish army commanded by Maximilian blocked this manoeuver by making a stand at Boitsfort. Generals Verboom and Grimaldi managed to block the Allied advance near Groenendaal. The Irish Brigade under lord Clare and Flemish troops came to reinforce them, followed by the infantry brigades of Bavaria, Picardy, and a Spanish brigade under d'Alvelda. Together they forced the Allies to retreat in disorder. Pastur managed to take many prisoners that day from among the Dutch troops of general Ernst Wilhelm von Salisch, and the English light infantry. The next day the Allied army retreated across the Dyle in good order near Laurensart. This was the last time Pastur fought near the Sonian Forest.

In 1706, Pastur was apparently knighted as from 1707 on he signs himself Chevalier de Pastur on official documents. In 1706, he took part with his regiment in the Battle of Ramillies that was lost by the French, which caused a great loss of morale resulting in many desertions. Pastur's regiment also lost an appreciable number of men by desertion. In 1709, he showed up with a small force close to the Allied lines during the Siege of Tournai. However, Imperial hussars effectively destroyed his force.

In later years, he apparently specialized in the type of cavalry raids that were the only recourse left to the Franco-Belgian army, after it had lost the war in the Southern Netherlands. His largest exploit was a deeply penetrating cavalry raid of about 1500 troopers into the Generality Lands of the Dutch Republic in August 1712, which brought him through North Brabant to the city of Tholen, (Note: Tholen was at the time one of the four voting cities in the States of Zeeland.) which city he ransacked and burned on 25 August. This raid was a retaliation for a similar raid through Northern France executed by the Dutch general Frederik Sirtema van Grovestins in July 1712. Quincy relates that Pastur at the head of his dragoons started during the night of 23 to 24 August 1712 from Namur (including part of the garrison of that fortress). Despite the need to cross several rivers, he arrived on 25 August in the vicinity of Bergen op Zoom where he divided his force into three parts. He himself went with about 300 troopers toward Tholen, while the two other detachments went towards Heusden in the east, and Fort Lillo in the west. The entire area between Bergen op Zoom and 's-Hertogenbosch, and Heusden and Lillo, was put under "Contribution". (Note: This was a kind of "regulated extortion" used by both sides in the war. The people in an affected community were, under threat of burning their houses down, forced to pay a certain some of money, called the contribution, that usually did not exceed normal taxes, and they were allowed by their own authorities to deduct that sum from their normal taxes. This was put into a formal agreement with the affected authorities, that would be enforceable by actual violence if the agreement was not honored.) To ensure payment about sixty hostages were taken, mostly people in authority, like burgomasters, bailiffs, and other magistrates. In retaliation for the depredations of Grovestins, according to Quincy, Pastur could have burned down Tholen and Steenbergen in their entirety, but it sufficed for him to just put a few houses to the torch, to make his point, and left it to the inhabitants to extinguish the fire. His troopers showed less moderation as they pillaged the communities, taking most of the possessions of the richer inhabitants. While Pastur was busy with his punitive expedition, the garrisons of the fortified places in the area mobilized to pursue him and if possible, surround him. Prince Eugene sent a detachment of 30 squadrons of cavalry to Leuven to try and cut him off at the pass, but it was in vain as they arrived three hours after Pastur had already passed the city on his way back to Namur, where he arrived on the night of 27 August, with his sixty hostages, and a large amount of war booty, among which a hundred drayhorses. He had lost just one dragoon.

After the Peace of Utrecht in 1713, Pastur went into French service. He took part in the Rhine campaign of 1713. On 15 September 1713, he was in Landau after the fourth Siege of that city had been victorious for the French. He again received the rank of mestre de camp on 20 March 1716. In 1718, he is Maréchal de camp and Louis XV has created him a Chevalier de Saint-Lazare.

Pastur died in his birthplace Waterloo on 2 May 1723.

== Sources ==
- Cayron, J.R. (1953). La véritable histoire de Jacques Pastur dit Jaco brigadier de cavalerie et de dragons au service de l'Espagne (in French). Bruxelles: Coll. d'histoire militaire belge.
- Dop, P van (2018). Aller à la Guerre!La petite guerre tijdens de Spaanse Successieoorlog (in Dutch). pp. 17–22.
- Pierron, S. (1905). Histoire de la forêt de Soigne (in French). Imp. scientifique Charles Bulens.
- Quincy, Charles Sevin de (1726). Histoire Militaire Du Règne De Louis Le Grand, Roy De France, Oú L'On Trouve Un Détail De toutes les Batailles, Sieges, Combats particuliers, & generalement de toutes les actions de Guerre qui se sont passées pendant le cours de son Regne, tant sur Terre que sur Mer: Enrichie Des Plans Nécessaires; On Y A Joint Un Traité Particulier de Pratiques et de Maximes de l'Art Militaire (in French). Vol. 7. Denis Mariette.
- Van Lennep, Jacob (1880). "Twinstigste hoodstuk". De geschiedenis van Nederland, aan het Nederlandsche Volk verteld [The history of the Netherlands, told to the Dutch nation] (in Dutch). Vol. 3. Leiden. pp. 276–291.
- Wijn, J.W. (1959). Het Staatsche Leger: Deel VIII-2 Het tijdperk van de Spaanse Successieoorlog 1706–1710 (The Dutch States Army: Part VIII-2 The era of the War of the Spanish Succession 1706–1710) (in Dutch). Martinus Nijhoff.
