= List of places in Belgium named after people =

This is a list of inhabited places in Belgium which are named after people. The etymology is generally referenced in the article about the person or the place.

== A ==
- Alken – Allius
- Anneessens Quarter – Frans Anneessens, dean of the Nation of St. Christopher, one of the Guilds of Brussels.
- Auderghem – Aldaric

== B ==
- Baarle-Hertog – John III, Duke of Brabant
- Berchem-Sainte-Agathe – Agatha of Sicily.
- Braine-le-Comte – Baldwin IV, Count of Hainaut.

== C ==
- Charleroi – Charles III of Hainaut
- Chimay – Cimus, local Gallic chieftain.

== D ==
- Dansaert Quarter – Antoine Dansaert, Belgian representative.

== F ==
- Flagey Quarter – Eugène Flagey, mayor of Ixelles.
- Fort Jaco – Jacques Pastur, local mercenary.

== G ==
- Gembloux – Gemellus
- Geraardsbergen – Gerald, Lord of Hunnegem.
- Gingelom – Gangilo
- Godarville – Godhardus.
- Gooik – Gaudius

== H ==
- Heikruis – Hado
- Hélécine – Hailo

== J ==
- Jodoigne – Geldo

== K ==
- Kemzeke – Camasius
- Kessenich – Cassinius
- Kumtich – Comitius

== L ==
- Leopoldsburg – Leopold I of Belgium and Victor Bourg.
- Leopold Quarter – Leopold I of Belgium.

== M ==
- Mariakerke – Mary, mother of Jesus.
- Martelange – Martelius
- Molenbeek-Saint-Jean – John the Baptist

== P ==
- Philippeville – Philip V of Namur.
- Prince of Orange – William II of the Netherlands

== S ==
- Sint-Agatha-Rode – Agatha of Sicily
- Sint-Anna-Pede – Saint Anne
- Sint-Genesius-Rode – Genesius of Arles
- Saint-Georges-sur-Meuse – George of Lydda
- Saint-Gilles – Giles the Hermit
- Saint-Hubert – Hubert of Liège
- Saint-Job – Job
- Saint-Josse-ten-Noode – Judoc
- Saint-Nicolas – Nicholas of Myra
- Sint-Amands – Amandus
- Sint-Gillis-Waas – Giles the Hermit
- Sint-Laureins – Lawrence of Rome
- Sint-Martens-Latem – Martin of Tours
- Sint-Niklaas – Nicholas of Myra
- Sint-Pieters-Leeuw – Peter the Apostle
- Sint-Truiden – Trudo

== T ==
- Temse – Tamasios

== V ==
- Val Duchesse – Adelaide of Burgundy, Duchess of Brabant

== W ==
- Wauthier-Braine – Walter, local knight.
- Wervik – Virovos, Celtic chieftain
- Woluwe-Saint-Lambert – Lambert of Maastricht
- Woluwe-Saint-Pierre – Peter the Apostle.

== See also ==
- List of places named after people
  - List of country subdivisions named after people
  - List of islands named after people
- Buildings and structures named after people
  - List of eponyms of airports
  - List of convention centers named after people
  - List of railway stations named after people
- Lists of places by eponym
- List of eponyms
- Lists of etymologies
