= Frederik Sirtema van Grovestins =

- Born: 1668
- Died: November 1750 (aged 81–82); Leeuwarden, Dutch Republic
- Military career
- Allegiance: Dutch Republic
- Branch: Dutch States Army
- Rank: Lieutenant general
- Conflicts: Nine Years' War; War of the Spanish Succession; Action of 18 June 1702; Passage of the Lines of Brabant; Battle of Ramillies; Siege of Ostend; Battle of Oudenarde; Crossing of the Scheldt; Battle of Malplaquet; Bombardment of Arras; Grovestins's cavalry raid; Siege of Bouchain

Frederik Sirtema van Grovestins (1668 – 3 November 1750) was a Dutch States Army officer. He advanced through the various ranks in the army, from captain and cavalry captain (Ritmeester) to lieutenant-general of cavalry (11 March 1727). Furthermore, he became general-quarter-master of the army and colonel of a regiment on foot at the repartition of Zeeland. In 1712 he became governor of Bouchain, in 1718 of Bergen-op-Zoom.

He was an outstanding cavalry commander who played an important role in various campaigns and battles. He also was an military theorist, who stressed to the cavalry of the Allies to seek their strength in combat with the bladed weapon, something that possibly influenced Friedrich Wilhelm von Seydlitz when he developed the Prussian cavalry later in the 18th century.

== Early life ==
He was born in 1668 to his father Binnert Herings van Grovestins and his mother Titia van Burmania.

== Military career ==
Grovestins grew up at a time when the Dutch Republic was regularly embroiled in major wars. In the Franco-Dutch War and the Nine Years' War the Dutch army, and the infantry in particular, had gained an impressive reputation. However, this did not apply to the cavalry. Although brave, they were often no match for superior French cavalry. The defeats that the Allied armies of William III of Orange had suffered in those previous wars could regularly be blamed on the flight of the cavalry. After 1700, however, led by a new generation of cavalry commanders such as Reinhard Vincent Hompesch and Grovestins, Dutch horsemen no longer allowed themselves to be intimidated by the French reputation. They had adopted the attack en mureille from the Imperials. According to this tactic, the squadrons moved forward like a wall. Although at the expense of speed and manoeuvrability, this took away the opportunity for the French to launch flank attacks.

Grovestins who had witnessed the campaigns during the Nine Years' War thought that the disasters that had befallen the Dutch cavalry were mainly due to its emphasis on the use of carbines. When firing these, the Dutch had to open their ranks wide, giving the French with their closed formations the opportunity to break up the Dutch formations. However, during the first months of the War of the Spanish Succession he did not yet see an opportunity to tackle this ingrained problem. He got his chance on 18 July 1702 near Groesbeek, shortly after the French attack on Nijmegen. While on a mission with 300 men to gather intelligence, he encountered 400 elite French horsemen under Colonel Phillippe who had been sent out for the same purpose. Grovestins' men urged him to attack the French, but it was unusual until this time that a Dutch cavalry commander would venture to attack an equal number of French horsemen, let alone elite troops with a numerical advantage. Grovestins pretended to retreat. When his men kept insisting, however, he said he would only attack if they tried his new tactics. Only when his men promised to attack the French without firing, in a closed formation and with sabre in hand he expressed his desire to attack. His new way of fighting proved to be a success. After a hard-fought battle, his cavalry managed to put the French elite troops to flight. The French lost 156 killed and wounded while the Dutch missed around 70 troops. This victory, which showed that Grovestins' ideas were based on solid foundations, caused other generals to adopt this way of fighting was the start of the many successes that would follow for the Allied cavalry in this war.

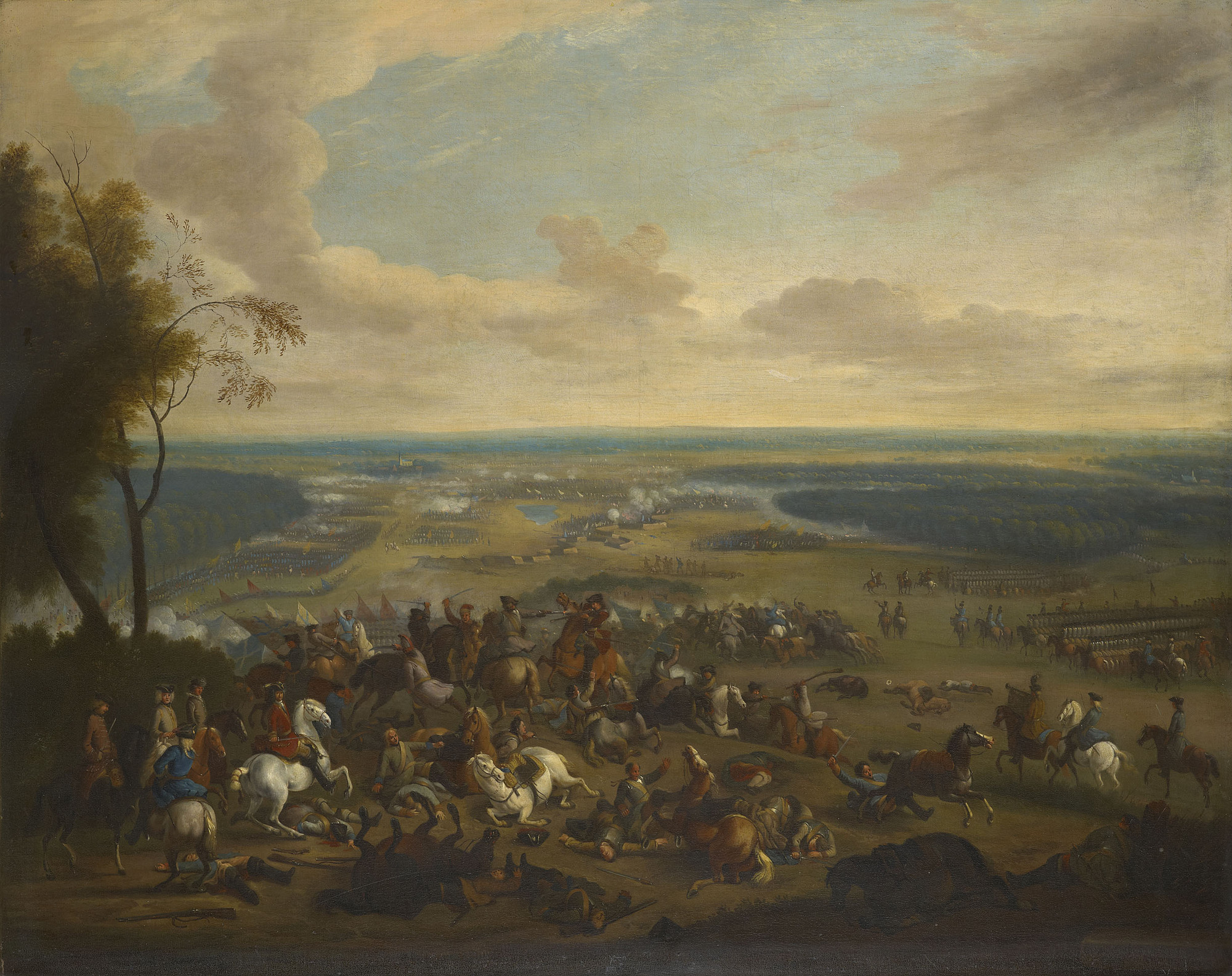
The Battle of Malplaquet

Grovestins was to play an important role for the rest of the war. Under cavalry general Dompré, he drove the enemy out of the village of Waterloo in 1705. He distinguished himself especially in the Battle of Malplaquet where he was the first to penetrate the French centre when he and several squadrons broke through the French entrenchments and successfully attacked the French right flank, which had done so much damage to the Dutch infantry, from the rear.

On 10 June 1712, at the head of a brigade of 1800 hussars and dragoons, he set out from the Allied camp at Tournai through Champagne and the dioceses of Metz, Toul and Verdun, and pillaged and burned those regions for 11 days. The almost unbelievable success of the relatively small force, the terror it so unexpectedly brought to the heart of the France, to the point that at Versailles it was seriously considered whether Louis XIV should temporarily leave his Palace of Versailles, caused general astonishment at the time. After returning from his illustrious foray, he was appointed governor of Bouchain, but with four weak battalions he was unable to defend this fortress for long and became a prisoner of war of the French in Champagne, the region he had so recently terrorised. The esteem in which the French held him meant that during his captivity he was allowed to travel freely through the Netherlands and France on the promise that he would return. However, the French retaliated when Jacques Pastur went as far as North Brabant and Tholen with an equal number of horsemen and plundered the area. On 11 April 1713, the Peace of Utrecht was signed, which ended conflict between the French and Dutch.

== Later life ==
When some years later he ate with Cardinal André-Hercule de Fleury, the chief minister of Louis XV, as a Dutch delegate in Paris in 1727, the conversation fell on the domestic situation of the provinces of France. 'Ask General Grovestins about that; he knows them,' said the Cardinal.

Grovestins died unmarried at Nijkerk near Leeuwarden on 3 November 1750.

== Sources ==
- Van Nimwegen, Olaf (2020). De Veertigjarige Oorlog 1672-1712: de strijd van de Nederlanders tegen de Zonnekoning (The 40 Years War 1672-1712: the Dutch struggle against the Sun King) (in Dutch). Prometheus. ISBN 978-90-446-3871-4.
- De Vryer, Abraham (1738). Histori van Joan Churchill, hertog van Marlborough en prins van Mindelheim (in Dutch). Loveringh en De Jonge.
- De Graaf, Ronald (2021). Friso: het tragische leven van Johan Willem Friso [Friso: the tragic life of John William Friso] (in Dutch). Boom. ISBN 978-90-2443-676-7.
- Wijn, J.W. (1956). Het Staatsche Leger: Deel VIII Het tijdperk van de Spaanse Successieoorlog (The Dutch States Army: Part VIII-1 The era of the War of the Spanish Succession) (in Dutch). Martinus Nijhoff.
- Blok, P.J.; Molhuysen, P.C. (1912). "Grovestins, Frederik Sirtema van". Nieuw Nederlandsch biografisch woordenboek. Deel 1.
- Van der Aa, Abraham Jacob (1862). "Frederik Sirtema van Grovestins". Biographisch woordenboek der Nederlanden. Deel 7 (in Dutch).
- Stapleton, John. M (2003). Forging a Coalition Army: William III, the Grand Alliance, and the Confederate Army in the Spanish Netherlands, 1688-1697. Ohio State University. Archived from the original on 2022-03-13.
- Van Lennep, Jacob (1880). De geschiedenis van Nederland, aan het Nederlandsche Volk verteld [The history of the Netherlands, told to the Dutch nation] (in Dutch). Leiden; z.j.
