= Siege of Bouchain (1711) =

1711 siege

- Part of the War of the Spanish Succession
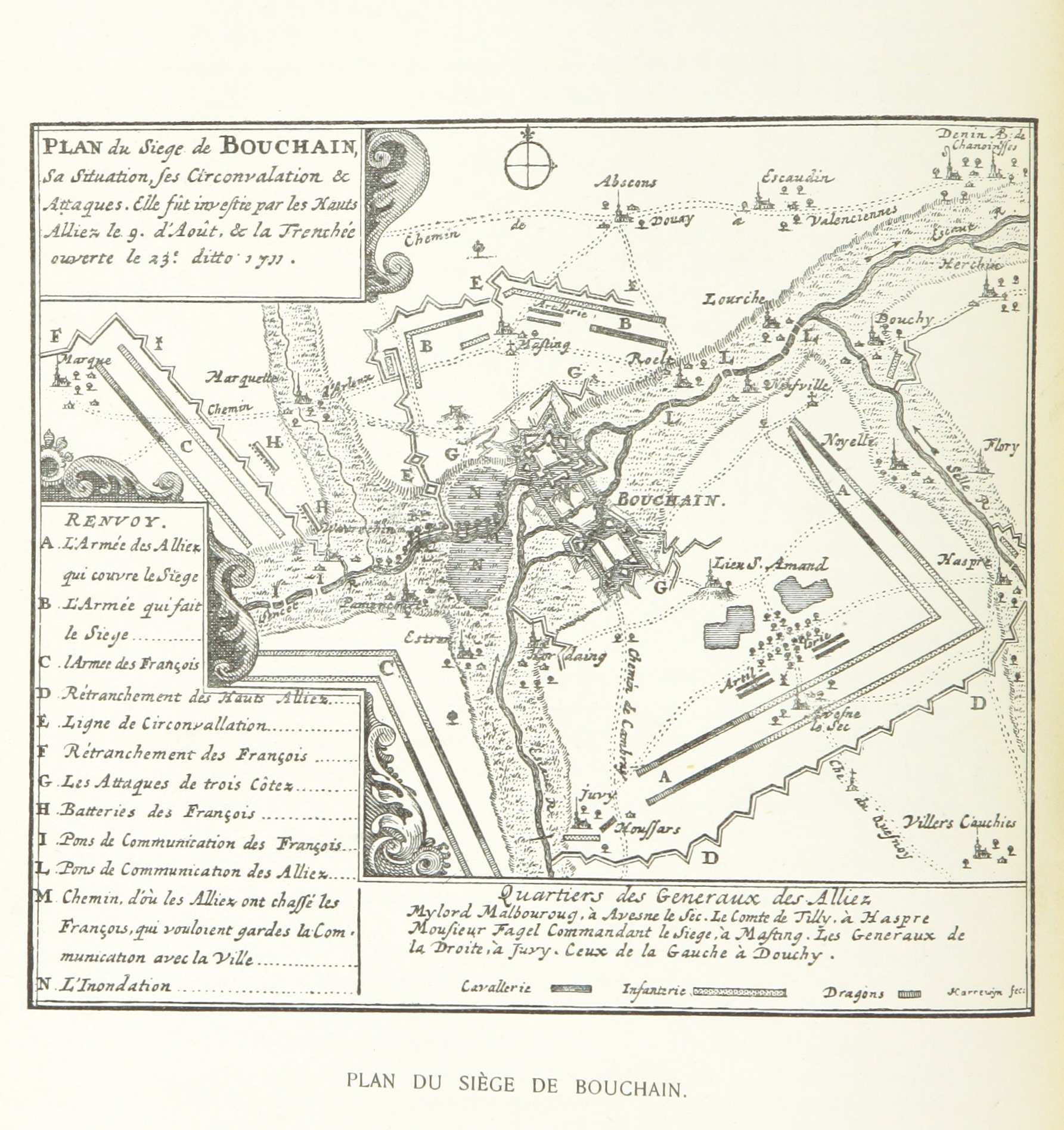
- Map of the siege taken from 'Histoire d'Iwuy'
Date	5 August – 12 September 1711
Location	Bouchain, France 50.2844°N 3.3178°E
Result	Grand Alliance victory

Belligerents
Dutch Republic; Great Britain; Habsburg Austria	France

Commanders and leaders
(Kingdom of Great Britain) Duke of Marlborough (Dutch Republic) François Nicolas Fagel	(Kingdom of France) Ravignan

Strength
30,000	5,000

Casualties and losses
3,000 killed	1,800 killed or wounded; 3,200 captured

The siege of Bouchain (9 August – 12 September 1711), following the Passage of the Lines of Ne Plus Ultra (5 August 1711), was a siege of the War of the Spanish Succession, and the last major victory of John Churchill, 1st Duke of Marlborough. Marlborough and François Nicolas Fagel broke through the French defensive lines and took Bouchain after a siege of 34 days. Its capture left Cambrai the only French-held fortress between the allied army and Paris.

== Prelude ==
Throughout the early summer of 1711 Marlborough's army, having taken the important fortress of Douai the previous year, manoeuvred indecisively in northern France, blocked by the French Lines of Ne Plus Ultra – a massive series of fieldworks stretching from the Channel coast to the Ardennes at Namur. The allied army had been weakened by the withdrawal of Prince Eugene's army to cover the upper Rhine, as the deposed Elector of Bavaria attempted to take advantage of the disruption caused by the death of the Emperor Joseph. On 6 July, Marlborough captured the small fortress of Arleux, just to the north of the Lines, west of Bouchain, both to deny its use to the French as a sally-port, and to secure the water supply to Douai, which could be cut off by damming the canal that supplied the town. The Duke was then wrong-footed by Villars as the French army crossed the Lines on 22/23 July and retook Arleux, with the allied army too far to the west to intervene in time, and the defences were levelled before the French retreated back across the Lines. Marlborough, initially furious, soon retook the initiative by marching his army as if to assault the Lines near Arras, and carrying out a detailed personal reconnaissance there on 4 August in full view of Villars' covering army. That night the army struck camp, leaving their campfires burning to deceive the French, and marched eastwards to Arleux. At midnight a force from Douai under Cadogan crossed the unguarded French lines, and by 8 am the advance guard of the main army was also crossing over. Villars, arriving on the scene with a few hundred cavalry, realised he had been outmanoeuvred, and though he attempted to offer battle in front of Bourlon Wood, Marlborough declined to attack, the Marshal's position being even stronger than the one in which he had given Marlborough's army such a mauling two years earlier at Malplaquet. He thus drew off and attempted to hinder Marlborough's siege of Bouchain which followed.

== Siege ==
To defend the town Bouchain's governor, de Ravignan, had some 5,000 men against Marlborough's besieging army of 30,000, and the advantage of one of the strongest fortresses left to France, surrounded by the marshy land of the confluence of the rivers Scheldt and Sensée. In addition, Villars' strong army had taken up position to the west of the allied camp, and had managed to open a tenuous link to the besieged garrison. Fagel, the Dutch commander who Marlborough had put in charge of the siege, responded by using earthwork gun batteries to counter Villars, used a crack assault force managed by 18 August to once more cut the Marshal's communication with Bouchain, and established a fieldwork-protected corridor from the siege camp to his main supply port at Marchiennes on the Scarpe. Frequent raids by Villars on both the supply convoys on the Scarpe, and towards Douai, failed to interrupt the siege, and the garrison marched out to become prisoners of war on 13 September 1711.

== Aftermath ==
Bouchain was Marlborough's last campaign. On the last day of the year he was stripped of his position as Captain-General, and of all his other offices. Command of the army on the continent for the campaign of 1712 was given to the Duke of Ormonde, and strict limitations were placed on his freedom of movement. Particularly he was prohibited from engaging the French in battle, as Anglo-French peace talks were well advanced, and the opportunity of seizing Cambrai and marching on Paris, opened by Marlborough's gains the year before, was abandoned. Before the year was out, the British Army would withdraw from the alliance, leaving the remaining allies, under Eugene of Savoy to be defeated at Denain.

The following year, Bouchain was recaptured on 19 October 1712 by French forces under Marshal Villars, after an 18-day siege.

== Representation in art ==
The Siege of Bouchain may be represented in a painting, of the Flemish school.
