= Battle of Malplaquet =

1709 battle of the War of the Spanish Succession

- Part of the War of the Spanish Succession
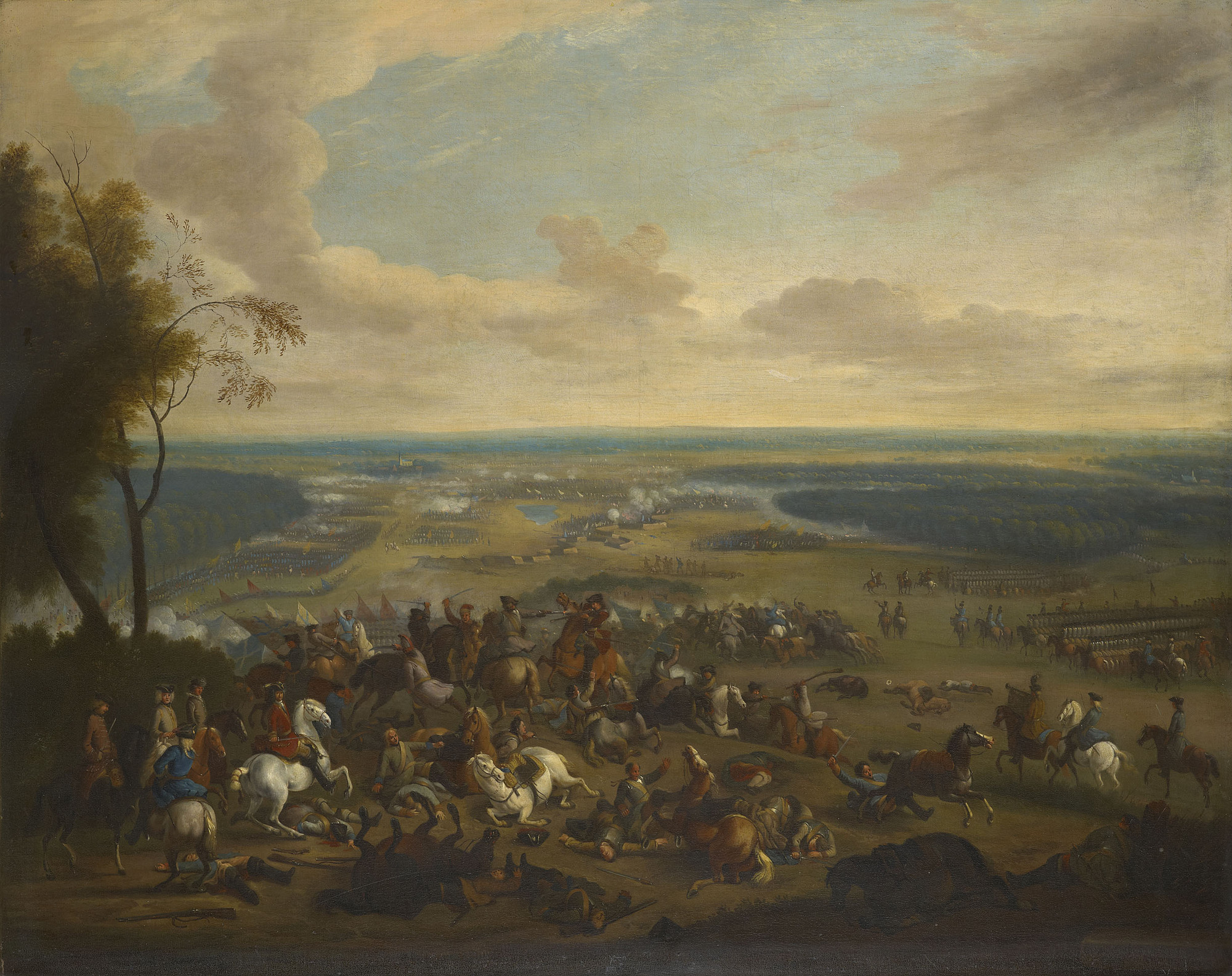
- Painting of the battle by Jan van Huchtenburgh
Date	11 September 1709
Location	Taisnières-sur-Hon, French Hainaut 50°20′10″N 3°52′35″E
Result	Allied victory (Note: See Aftermath for full discussion)

Belligerents
Dutch Republic; Great Britain; Holy Roman Empire	France

Commanders and leaders
(Kingdom of Great Britain) Marlborough; (Habsburg monarchy) Eugene (WIA); (Dutch Republic) Tilly; (Dutch Republic) Orange	(Kingdom of France) Villars (WIA); (Kingdom of France) Boufflers; (Kingdom of France) Puységur; (Kingdom of France) De la Colonie

Strength
86,000 to 110,000 men, 100 guns	75,000 to 90,000 men, 80 guns

Casualties and losses
c. 22,000	c. 11,000

The Battle of Malplaquet, 11 September 1709, was fought during the War of the Spanish Succession, near Taisnières-sur-Hon, close to the then border between France and Belgium. A French army of around 75,000 men, commanded by the Duke of Villars, engaged a Grand Alliance force of 86,000 under the Duke of Marlborough. In one of the bloodiest battles of the 18th century, the Allies won a narrow victory, but suffered heavy casualties.

Allied advances in 1708 led to the renewal of peace talks, which collapsed in April 1709. After taking Tournai in early September, the Allies besieged Mons, whose capture would allow them to enter France itself, and Louis XIV ordered Villars to prevent its loss. Although this proved impossible, he decided to fight anyway, and the two armies made contact on 10 September. Marlborough's attack was delayed until the next day, giving the French time to construct strong defensive positions.

After an opening artillery barrage, the Allied infantry made simultaneous assaults on the French flanks. These were intended to divert troops from their centre, weakening it sufficiently so it could then be broken by a mass allied cavalry charge. Although successful in previous battles, at Malplaquet the flank attacks incurred heavy casualties, while the French cavalry ensured their centre did not collapse. This allowed their infantry to retreat in good order, with the victors too exhausted to conduct a pursuit.

Most historians estimate Allied losses as about 22,000 killed or wounded, those of the French being around 11,000. These levels shocked contemporaries, and heightened internal divisions within the Grand Alliance over the wisdom of continuing the war. By saving his army, Villars arguably enabled Louis to negotiate better terms in 1713 than those available in 1709, but he failed to prevent the loss of Mons, and the Allied advance resumed in 1710.

== Background ==
By early 1709, the French state was bankrupt, while the Great Frost of 1709 caused widespread famine and mutiny among garrisons at Tournai, Arras, St Omer, Valenciennes and Cambrai. Desperate to end the war, Louis XIV initiated peace talks with the Grand Alliance in The Hague. He accepted most of their terms, including replacing his grandson Philip V of Spain with the Habsburg candidate Archduke Charles, the principle for which they were ostensibly fighting. However, he could not agree to the demand French troops be used to remove Philip, and talks broke down at the end of April. When the 1709 campaign began, Louis ordered Villars, his commander in Northern France, to avoid battle and prevent any further deterioration in the French position. Ordinarily an extremely aggressive general, Villars instead built defensive lines along the River Scarpe, running from Saint-Venant to Douai.

Key locations; modern French region of Hauts-de-France (dark green), Belgium (light green)

Convinced France was on the verge of collapse, the Grand Alliance moved to attack the line of border fortresses known as the Frontière de fer. However, while French strategy was ultimately determined by Louis XIV, that of the Allies had to be approved separately by the British, Dutch and Austrian governments, which often required compromise. Marlborough, the Allied commander, argued the positions held by Villars were too strong for a frontal assault. Since both Prince Eugene of Savoy and the Dutch opposed his preferred option of Ypres, he agreed to make Tournai the main objective for 1709.

Although persistent heavy rain caused further delays, the siege of Tournai began on 15 June. Reputedly one of the strongest fortresses in Europe, it surrendered on 3 September, and Marlborough immediately marched on Mons. Having assumed Tournai would hold out until October and thus consume the entire 1709 campaign season, Louis now ordered Villars to prevent the loss of Mons "at all costs...the salvation of France is at stake". Despite this plea, Villars was too late to prevent the town being encircled on 6 September by an advance force of 5,000 cavalry and 4,000 infantry, led by the Prince of Hesse-Kassel.

Marlborough and Eugene did not expect the French to risk a pitched battle, and resigned themselves to another siege, but Villars was confident he could secure a decisive victory. Louis urged caution, suggesting the difficult terrain warranted limiting operations to disrupting the siege, but Villars was determined to force a battle. The main Allied army arrived east of the town on 7 September, awaiting the arrival of their siege artillery from Tournai. Villars took up positions to the southwest on the 9th, leaving the two forces facing each other across the gap of Malplaquet.

== Prelude ==
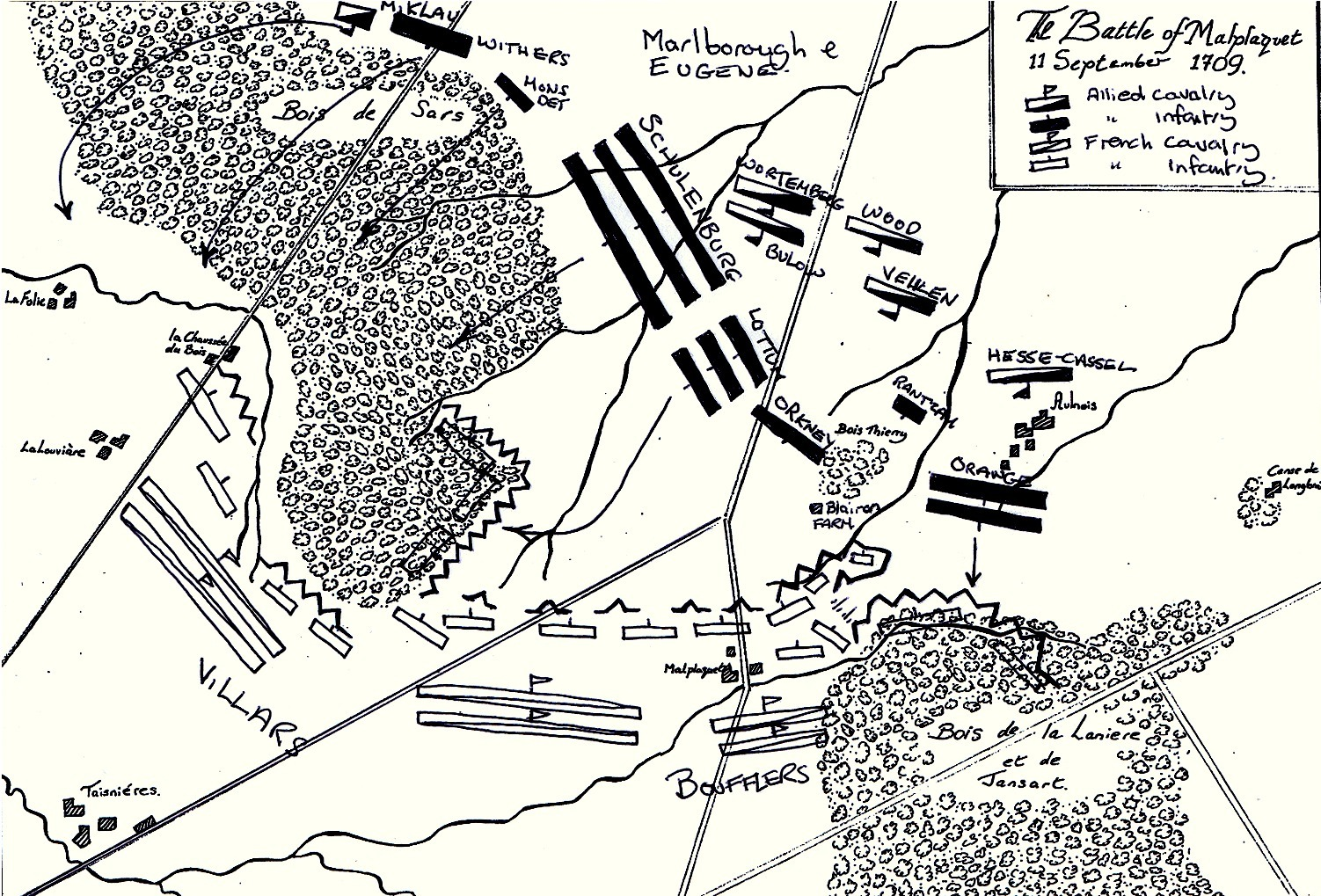
Disposition of forces; allied (upper right), French (lower left)

While conscious of the implications of defeat, Villars informed Louis XIV his army would dissolve if he did not fight. This decision allowed him to choose the battlefield, while his presence near Mons prevented the Allies from opening the siege, since he could either launch a relief attack, or cut their supply lines to Brussels by crossing the Trouille River.

On 9 September, Marlborough and Eugene struggled to assemble their widely dispersed forces amid heavy rain, only managing to form a battle line by the end of the day. Villars maintained his position, a decision subsequently criticised by some observers and historians, including Charles Sevin de Quincy, who argued Villars missed an opportunity to take advantage of this confusion to win "an assured victory".

The Allies further delayed their attack pending the arrival of 21 battalions from Tournai under Henry Withers. This was also criticised at the time and later, one analyst arguing "the battle should have taken place on 10 September, or not at all". Villars gained an extra day to construct defensive positions, including earthworks covering the open ground in the centre, and additional entrenchments extending into the woods on either side.

Marlborough's plan was the same as that employed at Blenheim, Ramillies and Oudenarde. On each occasion, frontal assaults on the French flanks forced them to move troops from the centre, which was then broken by mass cavalry attacks. Although the leading units suffered many casualties, allied losses were substantially less than those they inflicted. At Malplaquet the French held strong defensive positions, were better led, and highly motivated. (Note: One suggestion is that this was partly due to the mixing of regular troops with militia units who had not been demoralised by past defeats.)

Villars had also learned from Ramillies, where Villeroy arguably contributed to his own defeat by over-extending his line. He was helped by the fact that the battlefield at Malplaquet was much more restricted, allowing him to concentrate his infantry in defensive positions. It also prevented Marlborough from quickly shifting troops between wings, a tactic he often adopted to keep opponents off balance.

The French army consisted of 80 guns and 75,000 to 90,000 men, including significant numbers of Bavarian and Swiss mercenaries, as well as the Irish Brigade. Villars commanded the left, de la Colonie led the centre, with the right, where Villars had placed the bulk of the infantry, led by 67-year-old Marshal Louis-François de Boufflers, who was senior to Villars in rank but volunteered to serve under him. The infantry held a continuous line of entrenchments supported by artillery, with the cavalry massed in the rear.

The allied forces, in turn, ranged from 86,000 to 110,000, with the right wing formed of 30,000 German and Danish infantry led by Prince Eugene. Marlborough positioned himself in the centre, where he placed 8,000 mostly British infantry commanded by the Earl of Orkney, with the bulk of the 30,000 cavalry to their rear. Finally, the allied left was held by the Dutch, with 18,000 infantry under the Prince of Orange, plus 10,000 cavalry under the Prince of Hesse-Kassel. Control was exercised by Count Tilly, who had succeeded Lord Overkirk as senior Dutch commander. (Note: Tilly's anti-Orangist sympathies meant his largely pro-Orangist senior officers allegedly took their orders from the Prince of Orange and as a result seems to have had little influence on the battle.)

== Battle ==
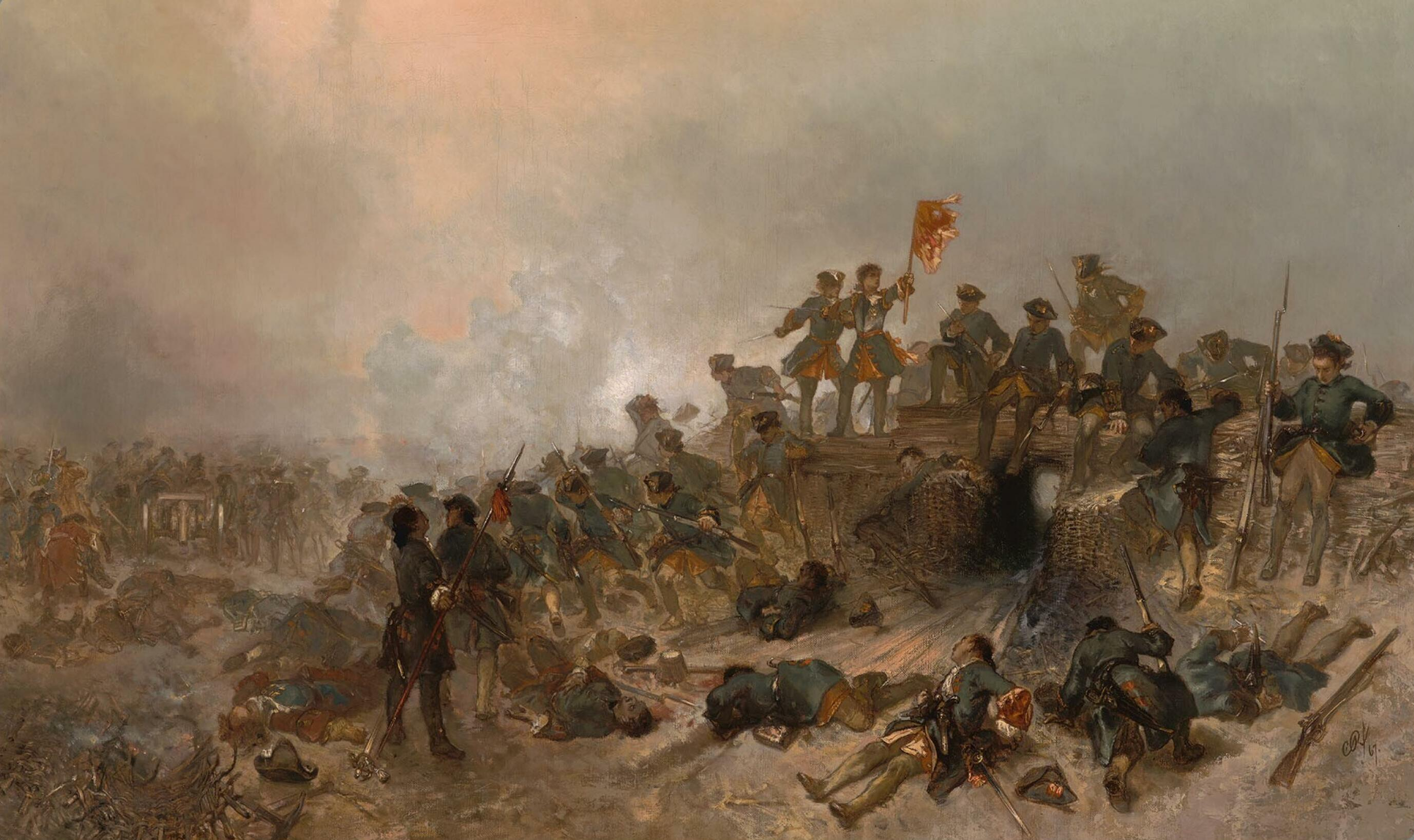
Dutch troops at Malplaquet led by the Prince of Orange, by Charles Rochussen

At 07:00 on 11 September, the Allies opened the battle with an artillery bombardment. This ended at 08:30, when their right wing, led by Count Finckenstein, Lottum and Schulenburg, assaulted French troops based in the French: Bois de Sars. During three hours of fighting, both sides suffered many losses, while Prince Eugene was slightly wounded but refused to leave the field. Around 09:00, Dutch infantry under François Nicolas Fagel moved against the French right with 13 battalions, including Swiss mercenaries and the Scots Brigade. When their initial attack was repulsed, the Prince of Orange and Sicco van Goslinga sent another 17 battalions to support Fagel by attacking French positions around Blairon Farm.

Although Blairon Farm was captured, the Dutch incurred over 5,000 casualties, including many senior officers. Despite their breaching the defensive line in several places, French reinforcements forced the Dutch back to their original positions, covered by their cavalry. Boufflers, in command of the French right, had over 60 battalions at his disposal, but made no attempt to launch a counterattack. For the next ninety minutes, action on this flank was limited to musket- and artillery-fire, with severe losses inflicted on the badly-positioned élite Maison du Roi cavalry.

Pressure from Prince Eugene forced Villars to keep moving troops from the centre to prevent the collapse of his left wing. Withers and the detachment from Tournai arrived too late to support the Dutch, and were instructed instead to make a flanking move north of the French lines in Sars Wood. This manoeuvre took over two hours to complete, by which time the fighting had largely ended, but their approach forced Villars to reinforce his left with another twelve battalions. By midday, nine French battalions and sixty cavalry squadrons in the centre faced twenty-three and eighty respectively. Villars was badly wounded shortly afterwards, and transferred command to Boufflers, with Puységur taking over the left.

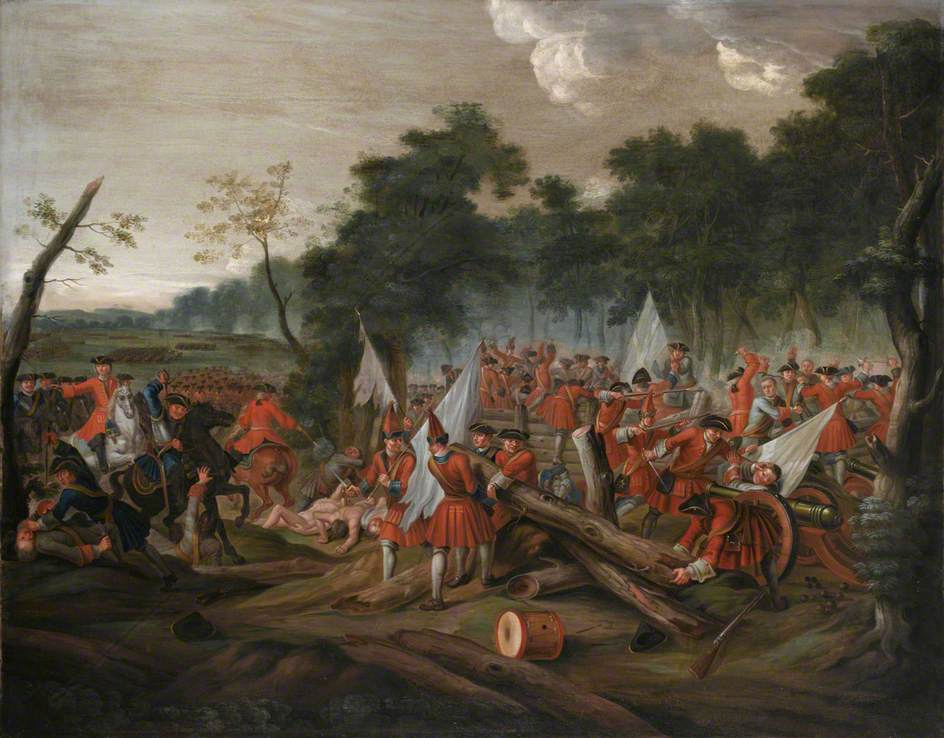
Battle of Maplaquet by Louis Laguerre; allied troops enter the French positions

Despite their losses, the Dutch assaults prevented the French right from reinforcing their centre. This was now over-run by Orkney's infantry, while the Prince of Orange led another assault against the French right. The Dutch cavalry under Grovestins broke into the French rear, before being attacked by the Maison du Roi cavalry under Boufflers. (Note: According to Quincy, James Francis Edward Stuart, under the pseudonym Chevalier de St. George, rode with the Maison du Roi as a volunteer during this charge.) Superior numbers forced the Allied cavalry back, before Orkney's infantry in turn repulsed the French. The allies advanced once again, and engaged the French in what became the largest cavalry action of the 18th century. As this unfolded, the French left finally started to crumble under pressure from Withers and Schulenburg.

Puységur now ordered his troops to withdraw. Meanwhile, the Dutch infantry, after initially making some progress, had once again been repulsed. It was only when Grovestins' cavalry threatened the French rear that they finally abandoned their entrenchments. (Note: Sicco van Goslinga about the Dutch casualties: "Yesterday, the princes and generals saw [...] with horror how our men lay against the field fortifications and entrenchments, still in the rank orders as they had fallen. Our infantry is dilapidated and ruined [...] Tilly will draw up a list [of the dead and wounded] in accordance with the advice of the generals and colonels. [...] It does not suit us to jeopardise our Republic so many times [...], but the good Lord has preserved it, at the cost of a river of blood shed by the bravest people in the world.") At 15:00, when Boufflers realised his cavalry was unable to resist for much longer, he ordered a general retreat towards Le Quesnoy, some 25 km (16 mi) away, with the Allies too exhausted to pursue.

== Casualties ==
Most commentators put Allied casualties between 21,000 and 25,000 killed or wounded, 8,462 of which were incurred by the Dutch infantry on the left wing. Orkney later wrote their dead lay "as thick as ever you saw a flock of sheep." (Note: The British lost 1,800 killed or wounded, although this excludes those serving in the Dutch Scots Brigade.) Other estimates range from a low of 15,000 to a high of 30,000. There is less consensus on French killed and wounded, which are generally put at between 11,000 and 14,000, with upper estimates suggesting 17,000 killed or wounded, plus 500 prisoners. (Note: Dumont and Rousset de Missy relate that after the battle, it was agreed that 1,500 French wounded, who had been left behind during the retreat, would be considered Prisoners of War until exchanged for an equal number of allied prisoners.) (Note: The estimate of 17,000 is supported by an intercepted letter from a French officer, who wrote: "...we had at least seven thousand killed on the battlefield, and more than ten thousand wounded.") The Allies also captured 16 French artillery pieces.

== Aftermath ==
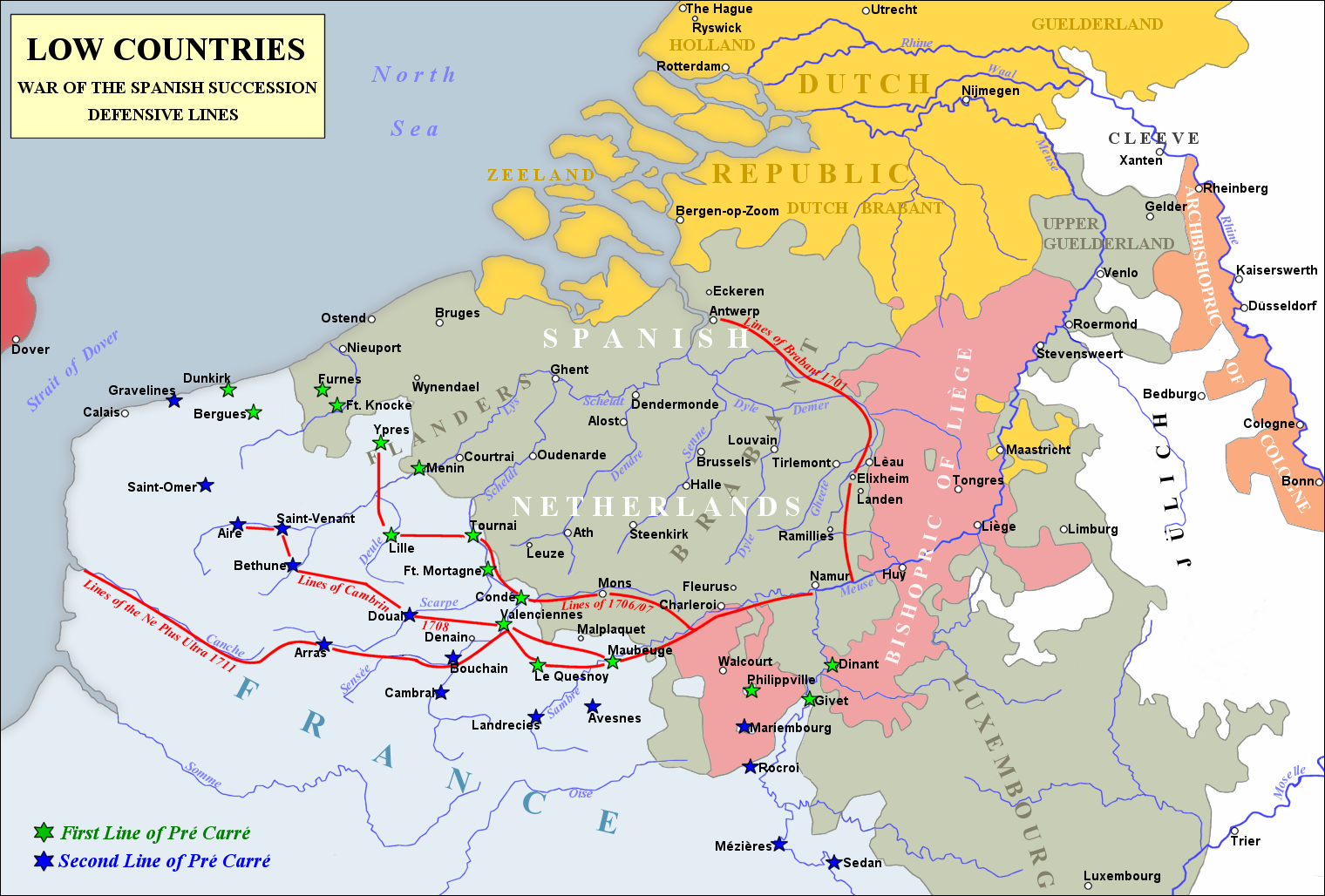
The Pré carré line on the French northern border, defended by a line of fortresses known as the Ceinture de fer (marked in red and green); by the end of 1710, this line was badly compromised

Despite incurring higher casualties, contemporaries considered Malplaquet an Allied victory, and modern historians generally concur. The French focused on the losses they had inflicted, Boufflers reporting to Louis XIV "...misfortune compels me to announce the loss of another battle, but I can assure your Majesty misfortune has never been accompanied by greater glory". In a similar vein, Villars later wrote: "If God grants us the grace to lose such a battle again, Your Majesty can count on all of his enemies being destroyed".

The Prince of Orange was left to capture Mons, which surrendered on 21 October. Despite this, in the long term Malplaquet arguably allowed Louis to obtain better terms at Utrecht in 1713 than those available in 1709. When peace talks resumed in March 1710, the French strategic position was largely unchanged, but the battle exacerbated Allied divisions over war aims and their associated cost. (Note: In 1709, Parliament approved expenditures of £6.4 million, up from £5.0 million in 1706; by the end of 1710, these had doubled to £12.9 million.) Even before the 1709 campaign, Marlborough himself felt Whig demands were excessive. With regards to British policy, Malplaquet was less significant than the defeats at Alicante and La Gudina, which made prospects of victory in Spain increasingly remote.

In early 1710, Marlborough wrote to the Allied negotiators at Geertruidenberg that "thanks to our victory..., you may have what peace you want". This was because capturing Mons left France open to invasion, while their losses at Malplaquet meant they could only act on the defensive. The Allies resumed their advance almost unopposed in early 1710, and by September had captured Douai, Béthune, Aire and Saint-Venant. Short of supplies, and with many regiments reduced to less than half their size, Villars could not risk the last French field army in another battle.

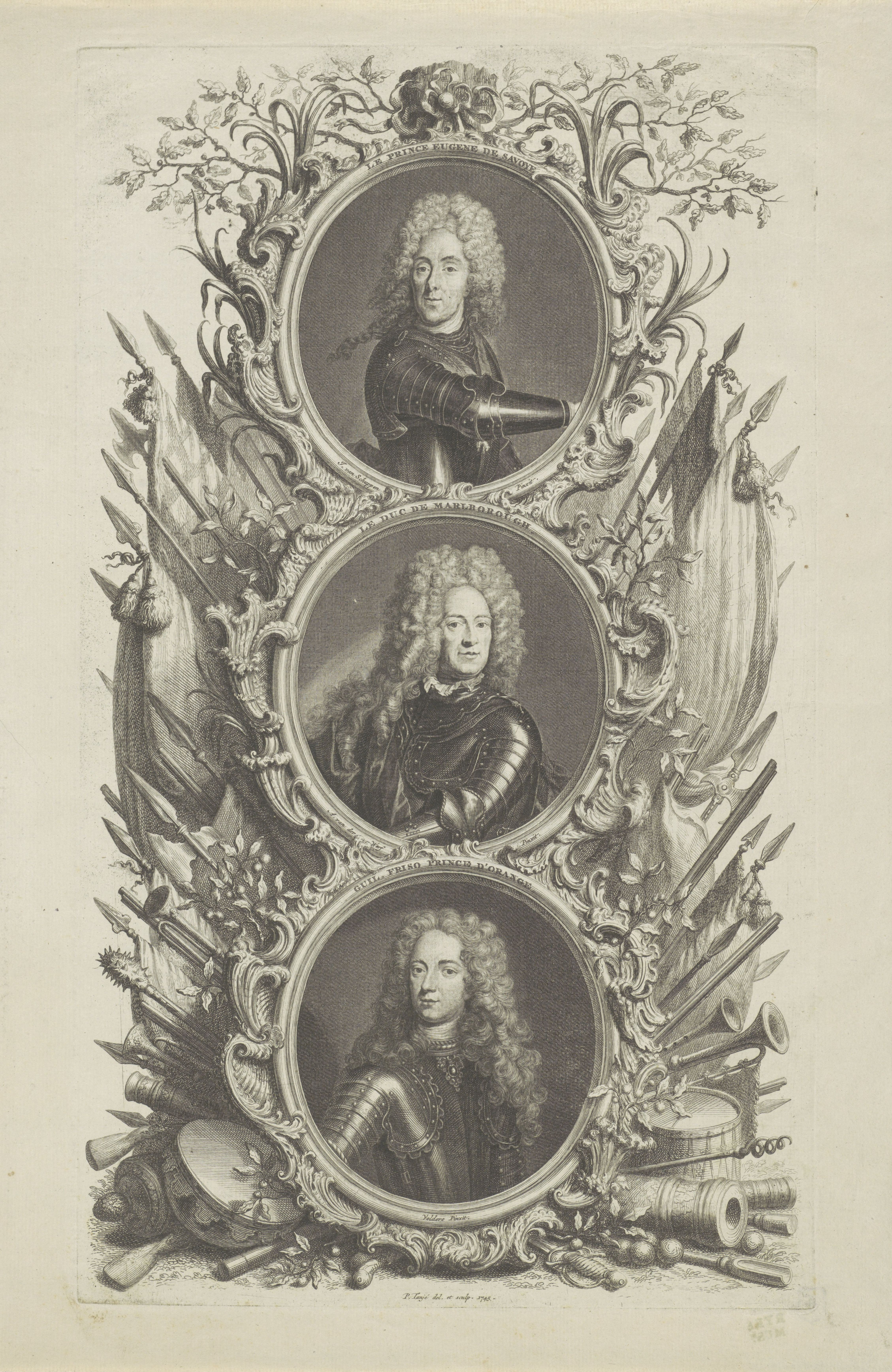
Portraits of Eugene of Savoy, Marlborough and the Prince of Orange, by Pieter Tanjé

As a result, the immediate impact of Malplaquet was political rather than military by now it was clear the mood in Britain had changed. Although British losses were comparatively low, (Note: Estimates suggest 600 dead, plus another 1,500 wounded.) Marlborough's domestic opponents used the heavy casualties to attack him. Reluctance to continue fighting for what seemed marginal gains resulted in a landslide victory for the Tories in the October 1710 British general election, although they confirmed their commitment to the war to prevent a credit crisis. (Note: Tory opposition to the war originated in foreign policy differences going back to the 1690s. Whigs viewed a Continental strategy as essential, while Tories favoured using the Royal Navy to attack the trading interests of their opponents. The latter also considered European commitments overly expensive, and primarily of benefit to others, notably their Dutch commercial rivals.) Despite success in France, British opposition to continuing the war was strengthened by further defeats at Brihuega and Villaviciosa in December 1710 which confirmed Philip V as king of Spain, ostensibly the original cause of the war.

The Dutch blamed their losses on Marlborough's tactics, Withers for not supporting their attack, and the Prince of Orange for continuing when the strength of the French positions became clear. Sicco van Goslinga, a Dutch field deputy attached to Marlborough's staff, also faced criticism for granting his permission to fight the battle. Suggestions by some British historians that the Dutch attack was only intended as a demonstration appear unlikely and Marlborough took full responsibility for not monitoring the Prince of Orange more closely. Although Grand Pensionary Anthonie Heinsius and several Dutch regenten felt Dutch losses justified more stringent peace terms, Goslinga argued they were to be expected, given the capture of Tournai and Mons, "two of the strongest fortresses in Europe", and victory in "one of the hardest battles ever fought".

In April 1711, the Habsburg candidate for the Spanish throne, Archduke Charles, succeeded his brother Joseph as Holy Roman Emperor. Since the British and Dutch viewed a union of Spain with Austria as unwelcome as one with France, this undermined a key reason for continuing the war. Although the capture of Bouchain in September 1711 removed one of the last significant obstacles to the Allied advance, the new British government had already secretly negotiated peace terms with Louis XIV, signing the Preliminary Articles of London on 8 October 1711. Marlborough was soon replaced by the Duke of Ormonde, who was ordered to prevent any further offensive action by British troops.

== Legacy ==
While the battle is now chiefly remembered by British and Dutch commentators for the casualties incurred, the French view it differently. At the beginning of the war, their army was considered the best in Europe, a reputation shattered by a series of defeats between 1704 and 1708. Despite being a narrow defeat which did little to change the immediate strategic situation, Malplaquet is seen as more important than victory at Denain in 1712. Historian André Corvisier suggests its significance in French military history is primarily psychological. He argues 18th century authors viewed it as the point when the French army regained its confidence, while for those writing after the 1870 Franco-Prussian War, it provided proof of French resilience and ability to recover from catastrophic defeat.

A total of fourteen battalions of Swiss mercenaries fought in the battle, six with the French, including two of Swiss Guards, and another eight with the Dutch. Malplaquet was the last action where Swiss mercenaries directly engaged one another until Bailén in 1808.

Written many years later, a firsthand account of the battle is given in the book Amiable Renegade: The Memoirs of Peter Drake (1671–1753). An Irishman who served in various European armies, Drake fought with the Maison du Roi at Malplaquet and was captured after being wounded several times. Another prominent Irish émigré, Féilim Ó Néill, was among those killed serving with the Irish Brigade.

== Sources ==
- Jenkins, Simon (2021). A short history of England. КоЛибри. ISBN 978-5-389-07036-3.
- Anquetil, Louis-Pierre (1819). Histoire de France depuis les Gaulois jusqu'à la mort de Louis XVI. Chez Janet et Cotelle. p. 241.
- Ivonina, Ludmila (2010). Война за Испанское наследство [The War of the Spanish Succession] (in Russian). Reviewed by Maria Eisenstadt (2 ed.). Smolensk: Smolensk state University Press. ISBN 978-5-88018-507-8.
- Bergin, Joseph (2001). The Seventeenth Century: Europe 1598–1715. Oxford University Press. ISBN 978-0-19-873168-9.
- Bromley, JS (1979) [1970]. The New Cambridge Modern History: Volume 6, The Rise of Great Britain and Russia. Cambridge University Press. ISBN 978-0-521-29396-9.
- Burton, Ivor (1968). The Captain-General: The Career of John Churchill, Duke of Marlborough, from 1702 to 1711. Constable. ISBN 978-0-09-456100-7.
- Chandler, David (1996). Marlborough as Military Commander. Da Capo Press. ISBN 978-1-885119-30-8.
- Chandler, David; Beckett, Ian, eds. (1996). The Oxford History of the British Army. OUP. ISBN 978-0-192853332.
- Corvisier, André (1997). La bataille de Malplaquet, 1709 : l'effondrement de la France évité (in French). Economica.
- Clodfelter, M. (2017). Warfare and Armed Conflicts: A Statistical Encyclopedia of Casualty and Other Figures, 1492–2015 (4th ed.). McFarland. ISBN 978-0-7864-7470-7.
- Dee, Darryl (2024). 1709: The Twilight of the Sun King. Rowman & Littlefield. ISBN 978-1-5381-7667-2.
- De Graaf, Ronald (2021). Friso: het tragische leven van Johan Willem Friso [Friso: the tragic life of John William Friso] (in Dutch). Boom. ISBN 978-90-2443-676-7.
- De Vryer, Abraham (1738). Histori van Joan Churchill, hertog van Marlborough en prins van Mindelheim (in Dutch). Loveringh en De Jonge.
- Delbrück, Hans (1919). History of the Art of War, Volume IV: The Dawn of Modern Warfare. Translated by Renfroe, Walter J. Praeger. ISBN 978-0-8371-8165-3.
- Drake, Peter (1960). Amiable Renegade: The Memoirs of Peter Drake (1671–1753). Stanford University Press. pp. 163–170. ISBN 0-8047-0022-2.
- Drévillon, Hervé; Fonck, Bertrand, eds. (2017). Introduction. Le tournant des dernières guerres de Louis XIV : histoire et historiographie in Les dernières guerres de Louis XIV; 1688–1715 (in French). Presses universitaires de Rennes. ISBN 978-2753585317.
- Dumont, Jean; Rousset de Missy, Jean; Van Huchtenburg, Jan (1729). Histoire militaire du prince Eugène de Savoie, du prince et duc de Marlborough, et du prince de Nassau-Frise, où l'on trouve un détail des principales actions de la dernière guerre et des batailles et sièges commandez par ces trois généraux. Trois tômes (in French). La Haye.
- Gregg, Edward (1980). Queen Anne (Revised) (The English Monarchs Series) (2001 ed.). Yale University Press. ISBN 978-0-300-09024-6.
- Hattendorf, John (1987). England in the War of the Spanish Succession: A Study of the English View and Conduct of Grand Strategy, 1702–1712. Naval War College, Center for Advanced Research. ISBN 978-0824078133.
- Holmes, Richard (2008). Marlborough: England's Fragile Genius. Harper. ISBN 978-0-00-722572-9.
- Instituto Português de Heráldica, ed. (2006). Anuário da Nobreza de Portugal; Tomo III (in Portuguese). Biblioteca Genealogica de Lisboa.
- Kamen, Henry (2001). Philip V of Spain: The King Who Reigned Twice. Yale University Press. ISBN 978-0-253-19025-3.
- Lynn, John A. (1999). The Wars of Louis XIV: 1667–1714. Longman. ISBN 0-582-05629-2.
- Parrott, David (2001). "War and international relations". In Bergin, Joseph (ed.). The Seventeenth Century: Europe 1598–1715. Oxford University Press. pp. 112–141.
- Onnekink, David; Bruin, Reger de (2013). De Vrede van Utrecht (1713). Verloren. ISBN 978-90-8704-312-4.
- Oury, Clément (2024). Malplaquet 1709 - La défaite qui sauve le royaume [Malplaquet 1709 – The Defeat That Saved the Kingdom] (in French). Perrin. ISBN 978-2262095710.
- MacDowall, Simon (2020). Malplaquet 1709: Marlborough's Bloodiest Battle. Osprey. ISBN 978-1-4728-4123-0.
- Nimwegen, Olaf van (1995). De subsistentie van het leger: Logistiek en strategie van het Geallieerde en met name het Staatse leger tijdens de Spaanse Successieoorlog in de Nederlanden en het Heilige Roomse Rijk (1701-1712) [The subsistence of the Allied and especially the Dutch army during the War of the Spanish Succession] (Thesis) (in Dutch). Universiteit Utrecht.
- Penant, Daniel (2019). "A French Account of the Battle of Malplaquet". Society for Army Historical Research. 97 (390): 222–229. JSTOR 26899866.
- Périni, Hardÿ de (1906). Batailles Françaises, t. VI. Flammarion. p. 241.
- Sevin de Quincy, Charles (1726). Histoire Militaire du Règne de Louis-le-Grand, Roi de France. Huit tômes (in French). Paris: Denis Mariette.
- Shinsuke, Satsuma (2013). Britain and Colonial Maritime War in the Early Eighteenth Century. Boydell Press. ISBN 978-1-84383-862-3.
- Simms, Brendan (2008). Three Victories and a Defeat: The Rise and Fall of the First British Empire, 1714–1783. Penguin. ISBN 978-0-14-028984-8.
- Somerset, Anne (2012). Queen Anne; the Politics of Passion. Harper. ISBN 978-0-00-720376-5.
- Thackeray, Frank W.; Findling, John E. (1998). Events That Changed the World in the Eighteenth Century. Greenwood Press.
- Van Alphen, Marc; Hoffenaar, Jan; Lemmers, Alan; Van der Spek, Christiaan (2019). Krijgsmacht en Handelsgeest: Om het machtsevenwicht in Europa (in Dutch). Boom. ISBN 978-90-244-3038-3.
- Van Lennep, Jacob (1880). "14". De geschiedenis van Nederland, aan het Nederlandsche Volk verteld. Deel 3 [The history of the Netherlands, told to the Dutch nation.] (in Dutch). Vol. 3. Leiden: Veertiende hoofdstuk. pp. 192–210.
- Van Nimwegen, Olaf (2020). De Veertigjarige Oorlog 1672–1712 (in Dutch). Prometheus. ISBN 978-90-446-3871-4.
- Wijn, J.W. (1959). Het Staatsche Leger: Deel VIII-2 Het tijdperk van de Spaanse Successieoorlog (The Dutch States Army: Part VIII-2 The era of the War of the Spanish Succession) (in Dutch). Martinus Nijhoff.
- Z'Graggen, Andreas (2018). "Die von May in der Schlacht von Malplaquet". Adel in der Schweiz. Wie Herrschaftsfamilien unser Land über Jahrhunderte prägten (in German). NZZ Libro. p. 51.
