= Siege of Bouchain (1712) =

- Part of the War of the Spanish Succession
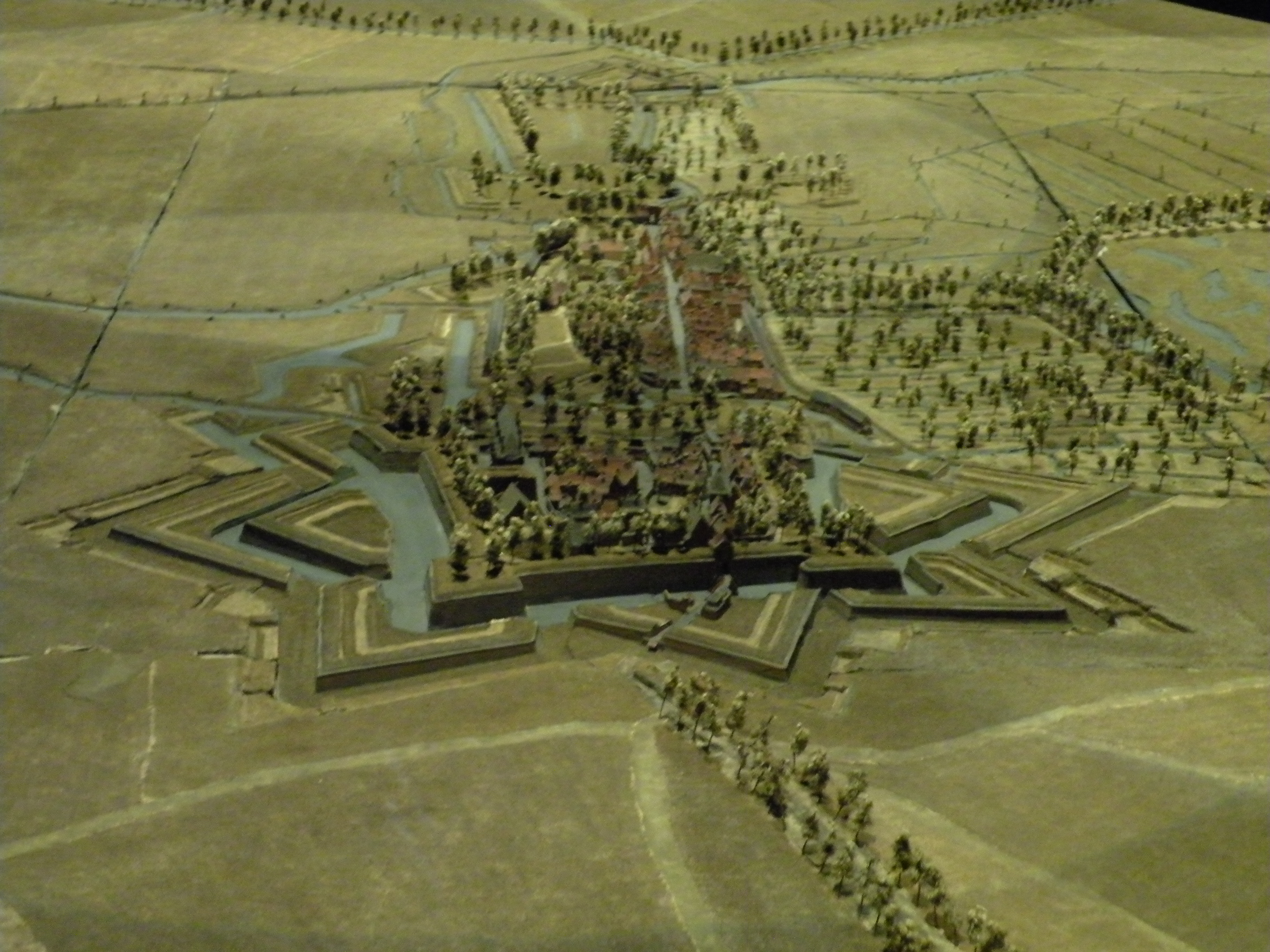
- Plan-relief of the Bouchain fort.
Date	1 October – 19 October 1712 (2 weeks and 4 days)
Location	Bouchain, France 50.2844°N 3.3178°E
Result	French victory

Belligerents
France	Dutch Republic; Holy Roman Empire

Commanders and leaders
(Kingdom of France) Duc de Villars	Frederik Sirtema van Grovestins

Strength
20,000; 40 artillery pieces	970; 23 guns 2 mortars 2 stone mortars

Casualties and losses
400 killed and wounded	All killed or captured

The siege of Bouchain (1 October – 19 October 1712), was a siege of the War of the Spanish Succession, and a victory for the French troops of the Duc de Villars. A French army of 20,000 men besieged and captured the Allied-controlled fortifications after an 18-day siege, with the 2,000-strong Dutch-Imperial garrison under Major-General Frederik Sirtema van Grovestins capitulating on 19 October.

== Prelude ==
The allies had captured Bouchain from French forces the previous year after a 34 day siege, ending on 12 September 1711.

Having taken advantage of the overstretched Allied lines of communications by crushing a Dutch-Imperial detachment at Denain in July 1712, the French Marshal Villars' army captured the forts of Marchiennes, Douai and Le Quesnoy over the next three months. Displaying great energy, Villars' advance guard besieged Bouchain on 1 October even before the French siege of Le Quesnoy was complete on 4 October. Villars and Louis XIV decided to conduct a siege instead of a blockade, to spare their troops the discomfort and because cutting off the water-logged town would be too difficult. Villars wrote

I am pressing vigorously to open the trenches...two days saved will be of great benefit when the rains arrive.

— Villars

== Siege ==
French provincial intendants provided the French army with siege material and peasant workers. The Allied garrison had 23 guns, 2 mortars and 2 swivel guns, while the French besiegers had 40 artillery pieces. The French approach on the left was slowed by Allied countermines that forced the French to sap the counterscarp. Eight grenadier companies stormed and captured the covered way on the right at the cost of 18 killed and 100 wounded. Thanks to the protection provided by sapping, the French troops on the left lost only 12–15 men while making their attack on the covered way. Villars was aware of the heavy casualties caused by assaults only lightly supported by artillery fire and without preparatory sapping, but judged the increased speed worth it against the protestations of his engineers. The French also made use of a feint attack to distract the garrison and constructed only two trench parallels instead of Vauban's recommended three.

== Aftermath ==
Villars' victory nullified the Duke of Marlborough's conquest of Bouchain a year earlier and concluded the Anglo-Dutch portion of the war in the Treaty of Utrecht on terms that kept the fortified zone constructed by Vauban in northern France under French control.

=== Casualties ===
The French lost 400 killed and wounded (2% of their force). The whole Allied garrison was either killed, wounded or taken prisoner.

== Sources ==
- Bodart, G. (1908). Militär-historisches Kriegs-Lexikon (1618-1905). Vienna: C.W. Stern.
- Chandler, David (1973). Marlborough as Military Commander (1989 ed.). Stroud, Gloucestershire: Spellmount Publishers Ltd. ISBN 978-0946771127
- Nimwegen, Olaf van (1995). De subsistentie van het leger: Logistiek en strategie van het Geallieerde en met name het Staatse leger tijdens de Spaanse Successieoorlog in de Nederlanden en het Heilige Roomse Rijk (1701-1712) [The subsistence of the Allied and especially the Dutch army during the War of the Spanish Succession] (Thesis) (in Dutch). Universiteit Utrecht.
- Ostwald, J. (2006). Vauban Under Siege: Engineering Efficiency and Martial Vigor in the War of the Spanish Succession. Brill. ISBN 978-9004154896
- Wijn, J.W. (1964). Het Staatsche Leger: Deel VIII-3 Het tijdperk van de Spaanse Successieoorlog 1711–1715 (The Dutch States Army: Part VIII-3 The era of the War of the Spanish Succession 1711–1715) (in Dutch). Martinus Nijhoff.
