= Petty warfare =

System of irregular warfare

Petty warfare (German: Kleiner Krieg; French: Petite guerre; Russian: малая война, romanized: malaya voyna) is a form of irregular warfare where small units attack the enemy's support operation to ensure that the main force enjoys favorable conditions for decisive battles. Petty warfare can be used in both ground and naval combat. The term first appeared during the 18th century and was subsequently developed by Russian and Soviet tacticians.

== History ==
The term "petty warfare" (German: "Kleinkrieg" or "kleiner Krieg"), was first adopted in the early modern period by German people, and was later on used in 18th- and 19th-century Russian literature to refer to a particular form of warfare in which small units, avoiding collisions with larger military forces, attack communication and small fortified posts, enemy convoys, armories, etc.

Petty warfare is similar to the later Spanish term guerrilla (literally, "little war") but differs by using solely special military forces; guerrilla warfare includes armed civilians and the irregular military. During the Napoleonic Wars, when the use of civilians in military actions became widespread, the term “little war” or petty warfare in Germany was superseded by “people’s war” concept (German: Volkskrieg).

It was common for 19th-century writers to write about a people’s war against Napoleon to describe the events that took place in Russia. In the early 19th century, a number of books on the theory of petty warfare were published in Russia and were later included as part of officer examinations.

The term “little war” was created at the time of a cumbersome system of arsenal supply during the early modern period, when the main means of transport were horses and carts.

The Seven Years' War was full of examples of how supply troubles often arose by the capture of transports and the destruction of stores. Such attacks led to the breakdown of planned large-scale military operations. For example, a new expedition of Russian troops to Berlin in late 1761 failed after Prussian Lieutenant General von Platen on September 15, 1761 captured a Russian convoy of 5,000 wagons and burned a number of stores that had been prepared for the expedition. Similarly around the same time, a Prussian garrison surrendered because Serbian hussars under the command of Peter Tekeli intercepted their convoy that went from Stettin to Kolberg (now Poland), which was full of gunpowder stocks and bombs.

The development of theories of guerrilla and petty warfare continued in the 1920s and 1930s in the USSR. In 1931, M. A. Drobov wrote a book, "Petty warfare: partisan and sabotage," which summarized the views of military-political leadership in the USSR on the methods of petty warfare. “Petty warfare. Organization and combat tactics of small units” book is the most recent literature in Russian dated 1998.

== Ground petty warfare ==
Ground petty warfare includes reconnaissance, sabotage, guerrilla, and terrorism used by small combat groups. Such combat groups are usually part of special purpose units and militia.

During the early modern period, the main petty warfare forces on ground were regular and irregular parts of light cavalry. In Austria, they were Croatian and Pandurs, and in Russia, they were Cossacks, Kalmyks and Bashkirs. King Frederick II of Prussia considered those ground forces to be one of the main advantages of Russian army during the early modern period.

== Naval petty warfare ==
In 1920s, petty warfare theories were part of the official concepts of the Soviet Navy. Naval petty warfare tactics included rapid surprise attacks on ground enemy units from shores with the support of the air forces and the coastal artillery.

== Examples of petty warfare ==
- Bombardment of Givet
- Grovestins's cavalry raid

== See also ==
- Guerrilla warfare
- Small Wars Journal

== Literature ==
- Groznoe oruzhie. Malaya voina, partizanstvo i drugie vidy asimitrichnogo voevaniya v svete naslediya russkih voennyh myslitiley. Sostaviteli Aleksandr Savinkin, Igor Domnin, Izdatelstvo: Voennyi universitet, Russkiy put, Seriya: Rossiiskiy voennyi sbornik, 2007 g.
- M. A. Drobov. Malaya voina: partizanstvo i diversii.
- Taras A. E. "Malaya voina" (Organizaciya i taktika boevyh deistviy malyh podrazdeleniy)
- Kvachkov V. V. Chast vtoraya. Specyalnye deistviya v voennom iskusstve sovetskogo vremeni 2.1. Teoriya i praktika spevyalnyh deistviy.
- Taktika malyh podrazdeleniy (iz polegogo ustava SSO armii UAR).
- Strachan Hew European Armies and the Conduct of War — New York: Routledge, 1983. — ISBN 0415078636.
- Pravila maloi voiny i upotrebleniya voisk. Obyasnennye primerami iz francuzkoi voiny maiorom Valentini.
- Engelgardt A.E. Kratkoe nachertanie maloi voiny dlya vseh rodov orujiya SPB. 1850. 112 str.
- Vuich I.V. Malaya voina S.-Peterburg 1850.(Ch1 Ohranenie voisk ot vnezapnogo napadeniya, Ch2 O deistviyah otryadami)
- Liprandi И. П. Некоторые замечания по поводу двух сочинений, вышедших под заглавием <малая война>. СПб., 1851. 75 стр.
- Satterfield, G. (2017). "The Fate of Petite Guerre in Early Modern Europe". Revue Historique des Armées. 286 (1): 48–59. doi:10.3917/rha.286.0048. S2CID 252116372.
- Srazheniya. Malaya voyna. Kurs po voyennomu delu. B.m.: Lit. Il'ina, 1855. 76 s.
- Novitskiy N. D. Lektsii maloy voyny, chitanyye v Yelisavetgr. ofits. kav. uch. Odessa. 1865
- Peritsonius G. Prikladnaya taktika. Razdel D- Malaya voyna. Voyennaya biblioteka. 1872. str. 544—563.
- Teoriya bol'shoy voyny pri pomoshchi maloy ili partizanskoy i s uchastiyem Landvera. Per. s nem. V serii: Voyennaya biblioteka. Tom 4. 1872. str. 493—607.
- Rodzishevskiy. Kurs taktiki. M. 1877. Otdel IX. Deystviya maloy voyny. str. 359—390.
- Gershel'man F. K. Partizanskaya voyna (issledovaniye). S.-Peterburg, 1885. 423 str.
- Fiedler, Siegfried: Taktik und Strategie der Kabinettskriege. 1650—1792, Bechtermünz-Verlag, Augsburg 2002
- Groehler, Olaf: Die Kriege Friedrichs II., Brandenburgisches Verlagshaus, Berlin 1990
- Grenier, J. (2012). "Continental and British Petite Guerre, circa 1750". The First Way of War American War Making on the Frontier, 1607–1814. Cambridge University Press. pp. 87–114. doi:10.1017/CBO9780511817847.005.
