= Bouchain =

Bouchain Boesem
- Commune
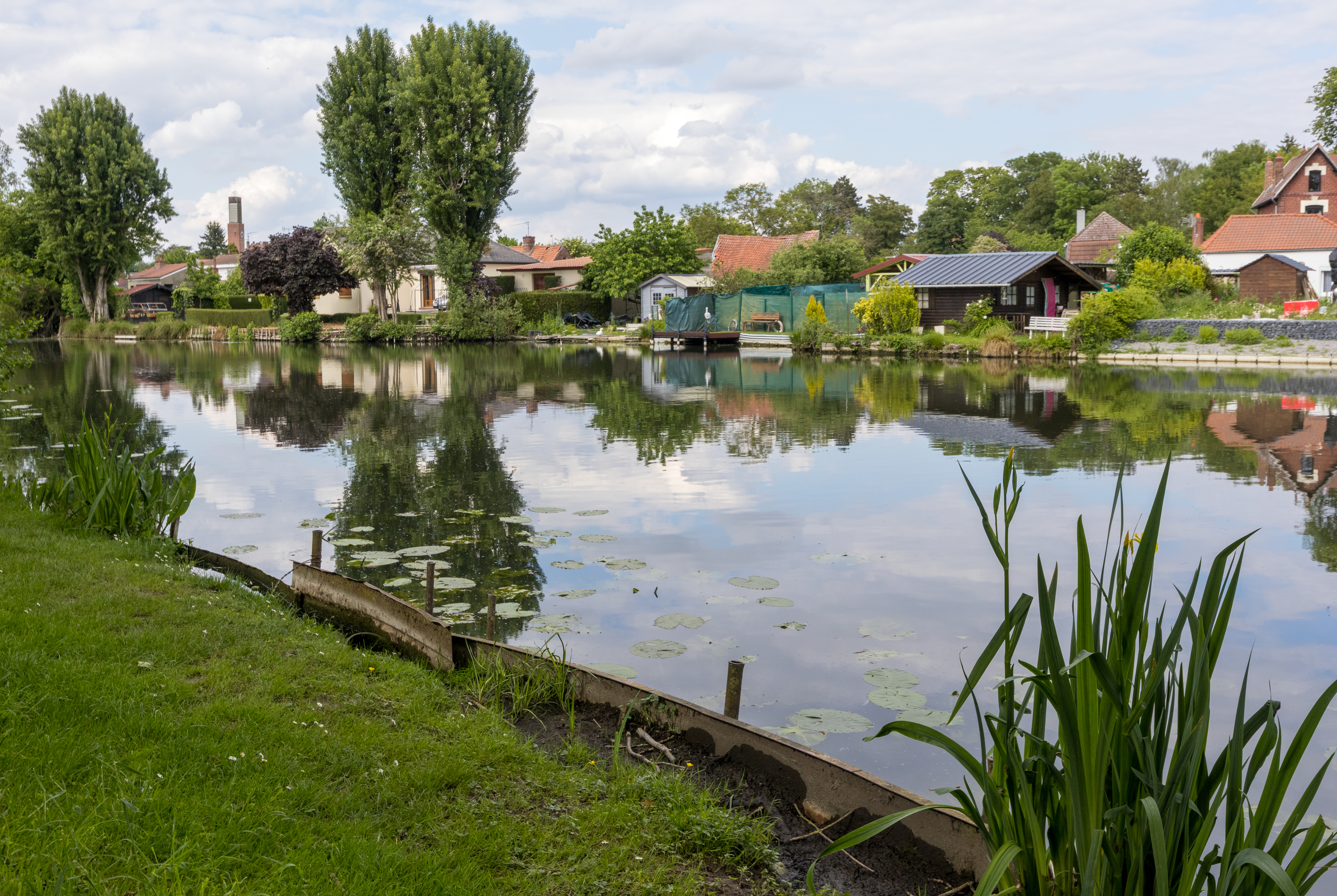
- A view within Bouchain

- Coat of arms
- Location of Bouchain
- Location within France Location within Hauts-de-France
- Coordinates: 50°17′04″N 3°19′04″E
- Country: France
- Region: Hauts-de-France
- Department: Nord
- Arrondissement: Valenciennes
- Canton: Denain
- Intercommunality: CA Porte du Hainaut

Government
  - Mayor (2020–2026): Ludovic Zientek
- Area^{1}: 12.39 km^{2} (4.78 sq mi)
- Elevation: 38 m (125 ft)
- Highest elevation: 100 m (330 ft)
- Lowest elevation: 31 m (102 ft)
- Population (2023): 4,113
  - Density: 332.0/km^{2} (859.8/sq mi)
- Time zone: UTC+01:00 (CET)
  - Summer (DST): UTC+02:00 (CEST)
- INSEE/Postal code: 59092 /59111
- ^{1} French Land Register data, which excludes lakes, ponds, glaciers > 1 km^{2} (0.386 sq mi or 247 acres) and river estuaries.

Bouchain (French pronunciation: [buʃɛ̃]; West Flemish: Boesem) is a commune in the Nord department in northern France.

It lies halfway between Cambrai and Valenciennes. Bouchain, seat of the early medieval County of Ostrevent, was taken by Arnulf I, Count of Flanders, in the 10th century and eventually subsumed into the County of Hainaut.

During the War of the Spanish Succession, when the town was fortified, Bouchain was besieged twice. On 12 September 1711 it was seized from the French after a 34 day siege by the Grand Alliance led by the Duke of Marlborough. It was again besieged, and recaptured by French forces, on 19 October 1712 after an 18 day siege.

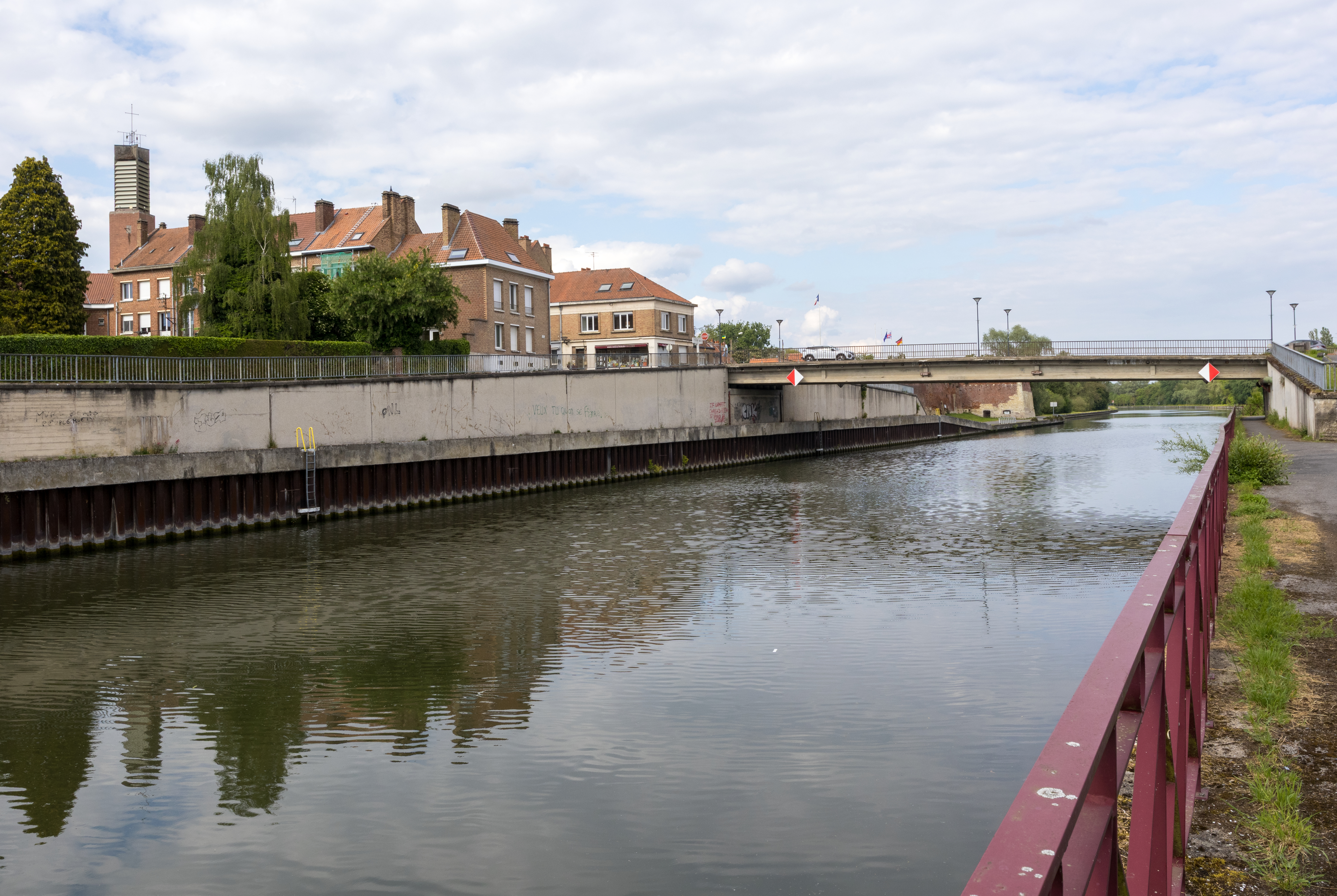
The Scheldt River

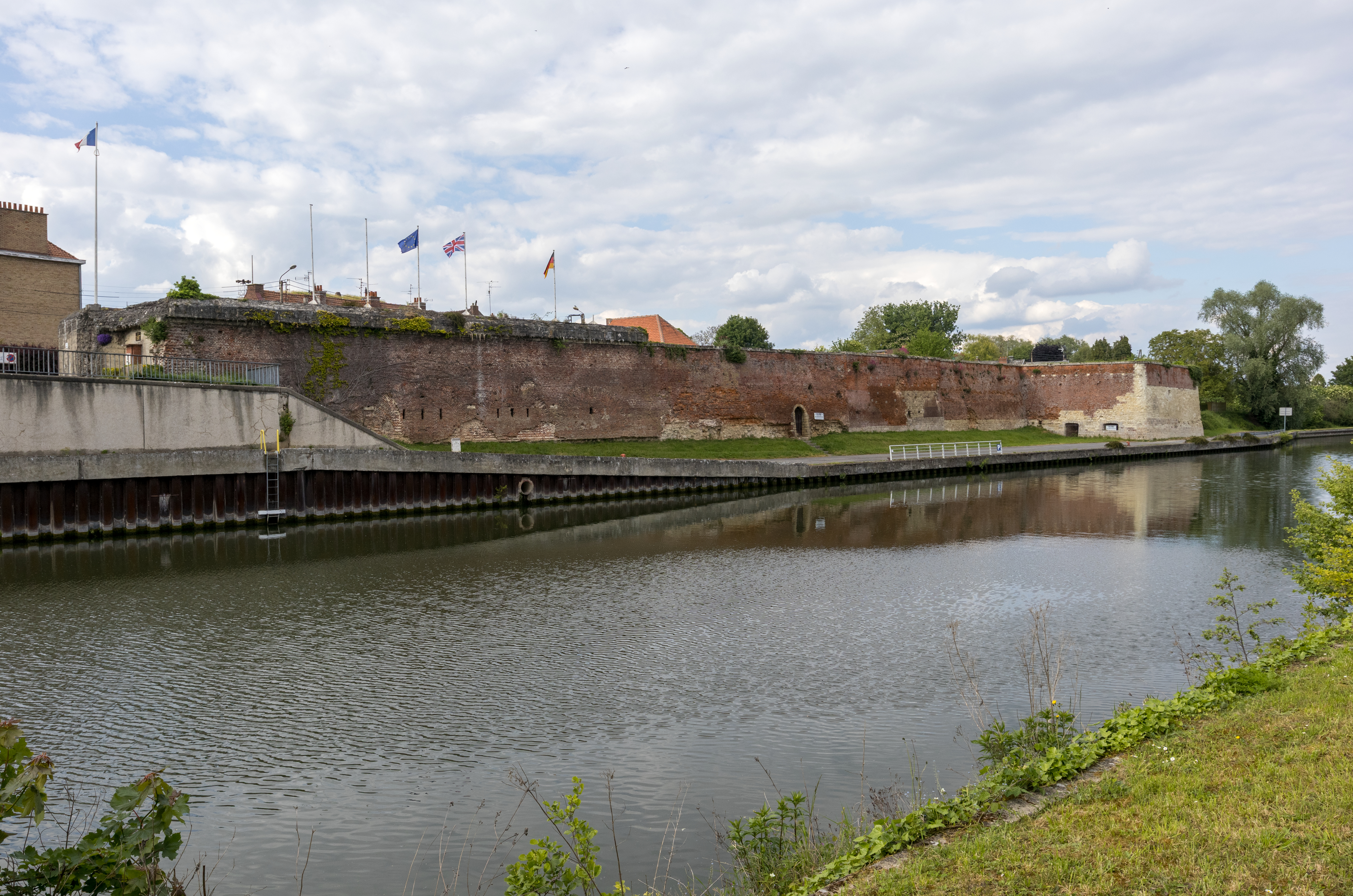
Bastion of the Forges

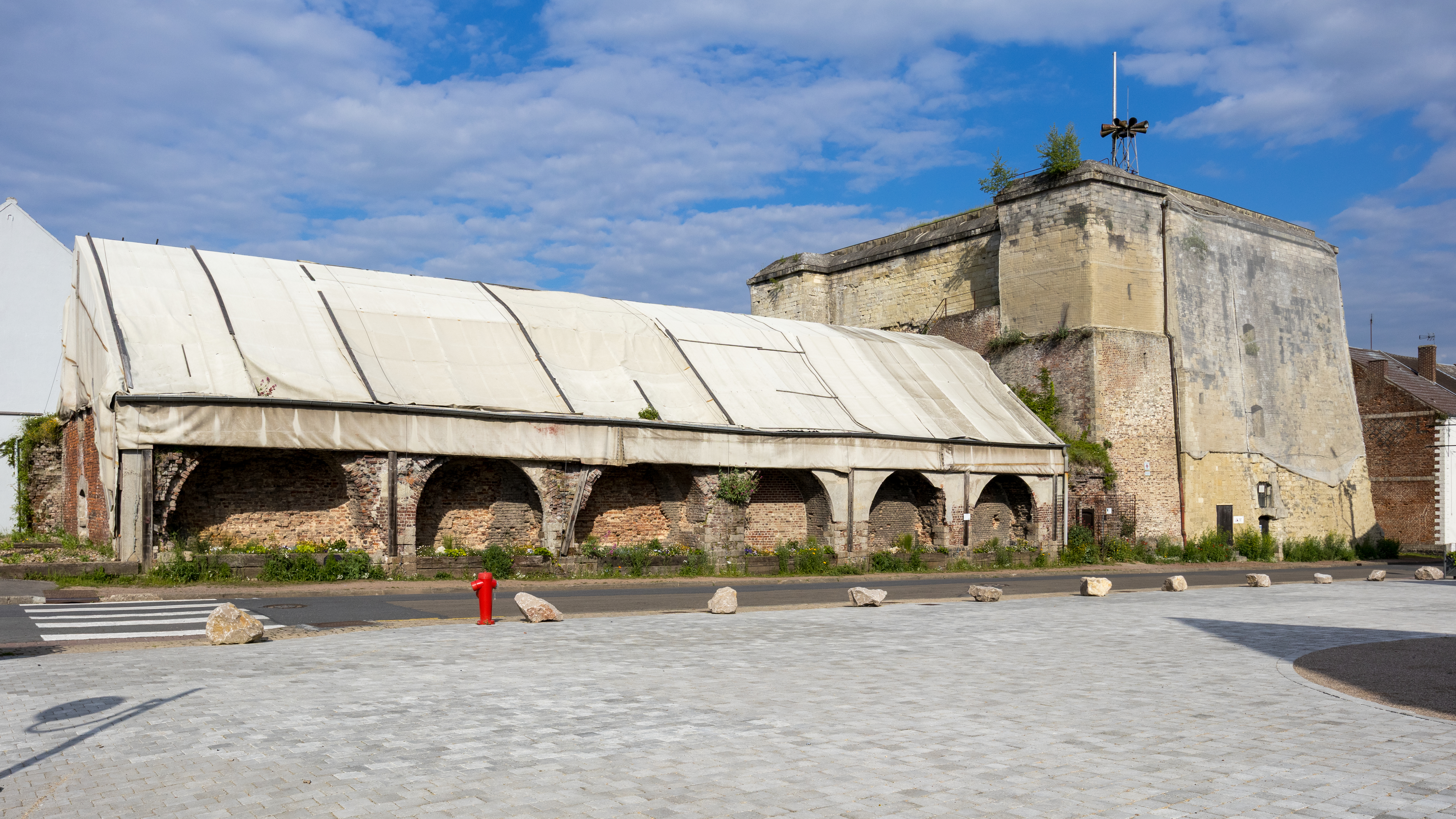
The Powder Magazine and the Ostrevent Tower

== Population ==
Historical population

Year	Pop.	±% p.a.
1800	1,128	—
1821	1,198	+0.29%
1846	1,463	+0.80%
1872	1,607	+0.36%
1901	1,760	+0.31%
1926	2,076	+0.66%
1946	2,421	+0.77%
1962	3,505	+2.34%
1968	3,916	+1.87%

Year	Pop.	±% p.a.
1975	4,826	+3.03%
1982	4,543	−0.86%
1990	4,317	−0.64%
1999	4,282	−0.09%
2007	4,174	−0.32%
2012	3,995	−0.87%
2017	3,952	−0.22%
2023	4,113	+0.67%

Source: EHESS and INSEE (1968-2023)

== International relations ==
It is twinned with Halesworth and Eitorf.

== Heraldry ==
Arms of Bouchain	The arms of Bouchain are blazoned : Argent, a tower gules. (form of the tower varies)

== See also ==
- Communes of the Nord department
