= Charles Sevin de Quincy =

French artillery general and historian

- Born: Charles Sevin; 1660; Meaux
- Died: January 10, 1738; Paris
- Occupations: lieutenant-general governor of Auvergne military historian
- Known for: Histoire Militaire du Règne de Louis-le-Grand, Roi de France (1726)

Charles Sevin, marquis (Note: According to the editor of the Memoires of his brother Joseph the title was probably a courtesy title, as he was unable to find proof of the creation of the marquisate.) de Quincy (Meaux, 1660? (Note: Larousse gives Meaux as the birthplace and 1666 as the birthyear. However Debrozy states that he entered service in 1676, which makes 1666 as birthyear unlikely. If he were born in 1660 he would have been 16 in 1676, which is more plausible.) – Paris, 10 January 1738) was a French artillery general and historian of the Wars of Louis XIV, who is still considered an authoritative source by modern historians. (Note: For instance Olaf van Nimwegen cites him repeatedly in his Nimwegen, O. van (2020). De veertigjarige oorlog 1672-1712, de strijd van de Nederlanders tegen de Zonnekoning (in Dutch). Prometheus. ISBN 978-9044638714.)

== Life ==
=== Personal life ===
Charles was the son of Augustin Sevin, seigneur de Quincy, and Marguerite Françoise de Glapion. He married Geneviève Pecquot de Saint-Maurice on 31 July 1696, and they had a daughter, Catherine Charlotte, who married René Jourdan de Launay, then governor of the Bastille, in 1721. His uncle Thierry, seigneur de Quincy (president of the Parlement of Paris), made him his universal heir, which left Charles very well off, despite the fact that the will was contested by Thierry's widow, and he had to pay back her dowry.

=== Career ===
Charles entered service in the French army in 1676 as a musketeer, in the second company of the Mousquetaires du Roi (mousquetaires noirs), where he eventually ended up as sous-brigadier. He was wounded at the Battle of Blenheim. (Note: The Battle of Blenheim is known in France as the second Battle of Hochstädt (1704).) He commanded the artillery of the French army as lieutenant-général de l'artillerie in 1707 under Villars. The next year he took part in the Rhine campaign of the Elector of Bavaria. In 1709 he fought at the Battle of Malplaquet. There he faced the Dutch attack of the Prince of Orange on the French right. When the Dutch entered the French entrenchments despite suffering heavy casualties de Quincy was proud not to see any soldiers of his regiment flee; Except one called Le Rouge. He was very lucky, because ... I ran after him to pierce him with my sword, [but] I fell, fortunately for him. This gave him time to rejoin his company. Afterwards, he swore to me that his company had run out of powder and that he had gone to get it. But his subterfuge was implausible, because we had only ordered the tambourineers to go and get it if the soldiers ran out. After the Peace of Utrecht he was appointed governor of Auvergne. He was a chevalier de l'ordre militaire de Saint-Louis.

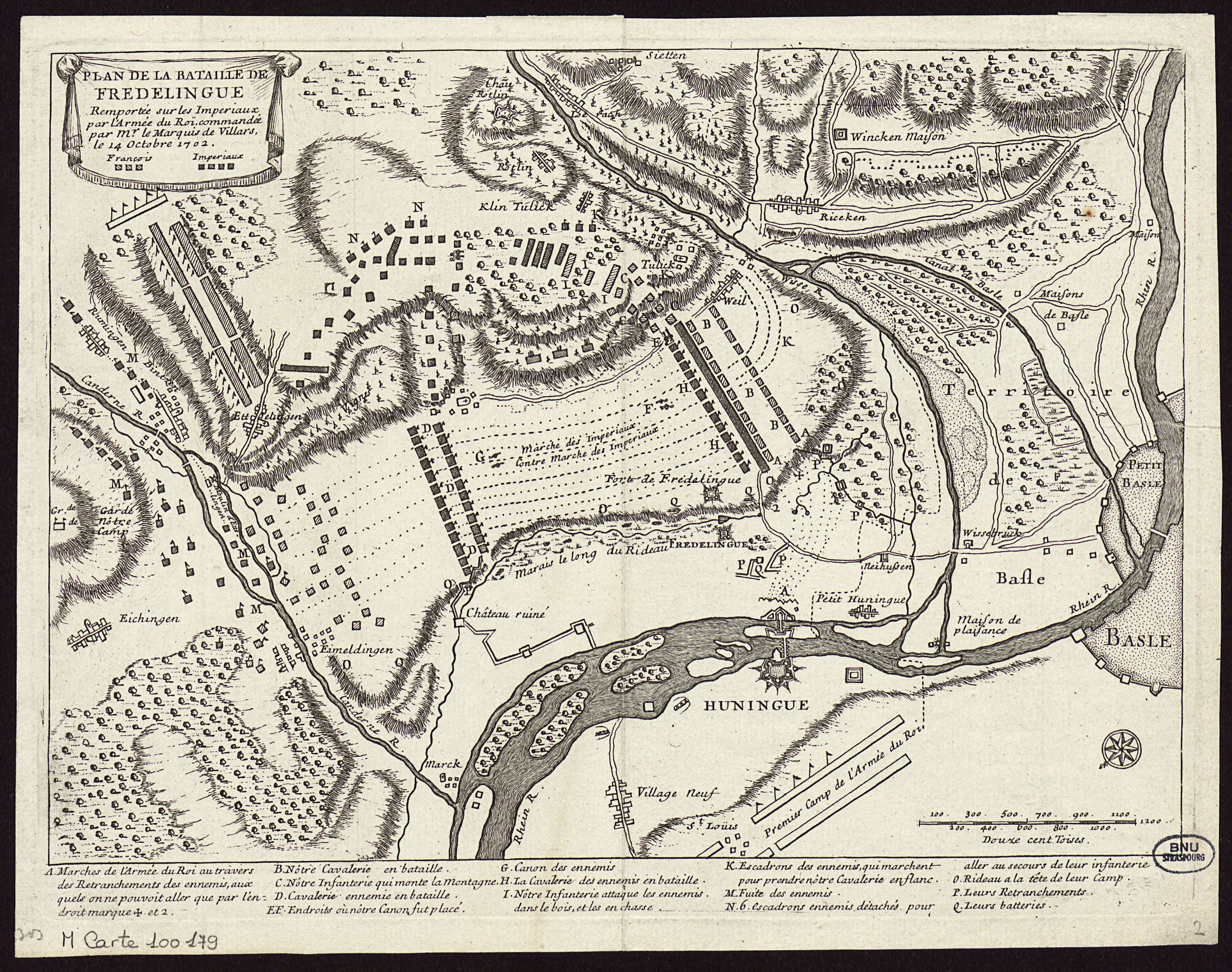
One of the maps that illustrate Quincy's Histoire militaire (Battlemap of the Battle of Friedlingen.)

Charles wrote most of his military biography of king Louis XIV after his military career had ended. According to his elder brother, Joseph Sevin de Quincy, the author of Mémoires du chevalier de Quincy, who also had a military career, Charles borrowed freely from the latter's diaries, without attribution, for the military history in that work. This clearly embittered Joseph, who writes on page 73 of volume II of his Mémoires: "I can assure you that the journals I kept of my campaigns, and which I sent to him very precisely, contributed not a little to help him compose this history; he did not show me the slightest gratitude. I found myself at nineteen sieges, six battles and several particular actions ... He does not say a word about it ... It amazes me all the more, that he gives praise to many general officers, in truth who hardly deserved them, and whose actions should be buried forever. I attribute this silence towards me to a little professional jealousy which he has always had against me, and which I forgive him with all my heart. (Note: "Je puis assurer que les journaux que j'ai faits de mes campagnes, et que je lui envoyois très exactement, n'ont pas peu contribué à l'aider pour composer cette histoire; il ne m'en a pas marqué la moindre petite reconnoissance. Je me suis trouvé à dix-neuf sièges, à six batailles et à plusieurs actions particulières ... Il n'en dit pas un mot ...Cela m'étonne d'autant plus, qu'il donne des louanges à bien des officiers généraux, en vérité qui ne les méritoient guère, et dont les actions devroient être ensevelies pour jamais. J'attribue ce silence à mon égard à un peu de jalousie de métier qu'il a toujours eue contre moi, et que je lui pardonne de tout mon coeur.")

The fact that the biography turned out to be based on the memories of two participants in the actions described, contributed to the value the work has as a primary source for the history of the War of the Spanish Succession, perceived from the French side. It may be said, however, that it often reads more as a hagiography. Another quote from Joseph, describing the unveiling of the equestrian statue of king Louis by François Girardon on the Place Vendôme (then called Place Louis-le-Grand) in 1699, at which he was present together with his brother, may let us better understand the attitude required of historians in the age of Louis XIV. He describes the unveiling ceremony, which involved the highest authorities in Paris making obeïsances to the statue as follows: "It seemed to me that this ceremony smacked a little of Nebuchadnezzarism; at least that reminded me of it." (Note: "Il me parut que cette cérémonie tenoit un peu du nabuchodonosorisme; du moins cela m'en fit ressouvenir.")

The Histoire Militaire du Règne de Louis-le-Grand, Roi de France was intended as a replacement for the "official" biography that was supposed to have been written by Jean Racine and Nicolas Boileau-Despréaux, but never marterialized, also because much material for it was destroyed in a fire in the library of Jean-Baptiste-Henri de Valincour on the night of 13 January 1716 in Saint-Cloud, according to the Preface. The War of Devolution, Franco-Dutch War, War of the Reunions, and Nine Years' War are treated in the first three volumes of the work, and the War of Spanish Succession in the four following volumes; the eighth volume is an essay on military strategy. In the Preface he furthermore describes the scheme he consistently follows for the description of the several battles and sieges treated in the book (such as strength of the opposing forces; dispositions; identity of commanders; manoevres executed; officers mentioned in dispatches; losses on both sides; and trophies captured; accompanied by the appropriate engraved battle and siege maps). In all of this he observed the best exactitude achievable.

Though Sevin writes in his Preface that "...my principal care has been to rid myself of all spirit of partiality, and to give the most sincere account of what has passed during so long a reign, without increasing the advantages, nor diminishing the losses of one or the other party, (Note: "...mon principal soin a été de me dépouiller de tout esprit de partialité, et de faire le récit le plus sincere de ce qui s'est passé dans le cours d'un si longue regne, sans augmenter les avantages, ni diminuer les pertes de l'un ou de l'autre parti...") the work was written from the French perspective. Ironically, two other French historians, Jean Dumont and Jean Rousset de Missy published a similar history, covering the War of the Spanish Succession written from the Allied perspective, as a military biography of the main Allied commanders John Churchill, 1st Duke of Marlborough and Prince Eugene of Savoy around the same time: Jean Rousset de Missy; Jean du Mont de Carelskroon; Jan van Huchtenburg (1729). Histoire militaire du prince Eugène de Savoie, du prince et duc de Marlborough, et du prince de Nassau-Frise, où l'on trouve un détail des principales actions de la dernière guerre et des batailles et sièges commandez par ces trois généraux. La Haye.

=== Publications ===
- Quincy, Charles Sevin de (1728). L' Art De La Guerre: Ou Maximes Et Instructions Sur L'Art Militaire. 2 Tômes (in French). La Haye: Scheurleer. (Note: Republication of volume 8 under a different title of the following work)
- Sevin, Charles, marquis de Quincy (1726). Histoire Militaire du Règne de Louis-le-Grand, Roi de France. Huit tômes (in French). Paris: Denis Mariette.

== Sources ==
- Bouillet, Marie Nicolas; Chassang, Alexis, eds. (1878). "Quincy (Ch. Sevin, marquis de)". Dictionnaire universel d'histoire et de géographie (in French) (26 ed.).
- Debrozy, C., ed. (1873). "Charles Sevin de Quincy". Dictionnaire général de biographie et d´histoire. Tôme 2 (in French). París: Chez Delagrave. p. 2238.
- Larousse, P., ed. (1875). "QUINCY, Charles Sevin, marquis de". Grand dictionnaire universel du XIXe siècle. Tôme XIII (in French). Paris: Administration du grand dictionnaire universel. p. 549.
- Quincy, J Sevin de (1898). Lecestre, L. (ed.). Mémoires du chevalier de Quincy. Töme I. 1690—1703 (in French). Paris.
- Quincy, J Sevin de (1899). Lecestre, L. (ed.). Mémoires du chevalier de Quincy. Töme II. 1703-1709 (in French). Paris.
- Quincy, J. Sevin de (1901). Lecestre, L. (ed.). Mémoires du chevalier de Quincy. Töme III. 1710-1713 (in French). Paris.
- Dupuy, T.N., ed. (1992). The Harper encyclopedia of military biography. HarperCollins. ISBN 9780062700155.
- León Sanz, Virginia.- 1713. La monarquía española y los tratados de Utrecht, Cuadernos de historia moderna, 2013.
- Van Nimwegen, Olaf (2020). De Veertigjarige Oorlog 1672–1712 (in Dutch). Prometheus. ISBN 978-90-446-3871-4.
- Ziegler, F.- Villars, le centurion de Louis XIV, París: Perrin, 1990.
