= Bombardment of Arras =

1712 engagement of the War of the Spanish Succession

- Part of the War of the Spanish Succession
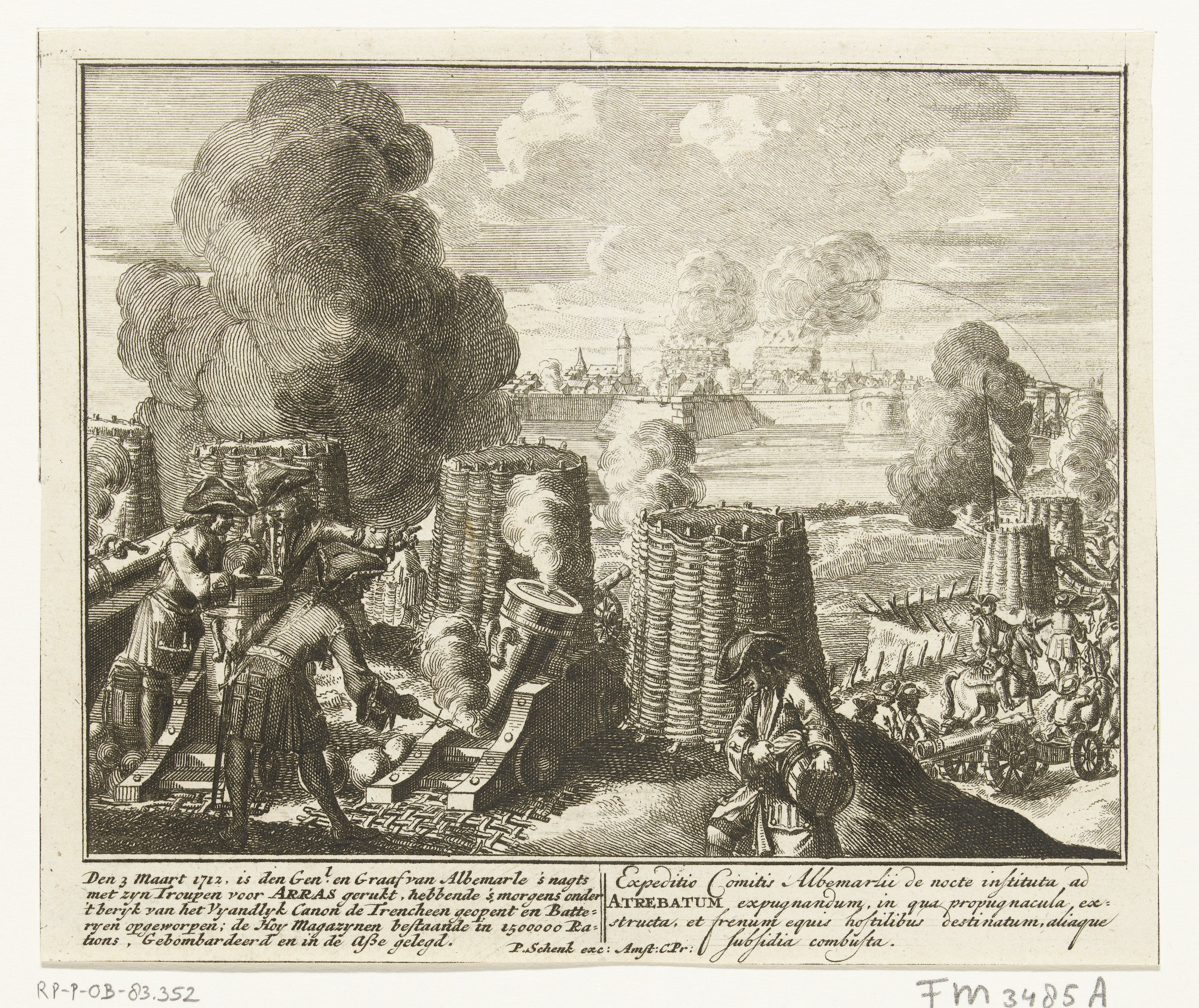
- A 1712 print depicting the bombardment
Date	2–3 March, 1712
Location	Arras, Kingdom of France
Result	Anglo-Dutch victory

Belligerents
Dutch Republic; Great Britain	France

Commanders and leaders
Albemarle; Hompesch; Grovestins; Cadogan	Montesquiou d'Artagnan

Strength
36 infantry battalions 44 cavalry squadrons (c. 17,400 men); 22 guns and mortars	Unknown

Casualties and losses
20 killed and wounded	1 to 1.2 million rations Unknown killed and wounded

The bombardment of Arras was an engagement of the War of the Spanish Succession which took place on 2–3 March 1712. A Grand Alliance army under the command of Arnold van Keppel, 1st Earl of Albemarle closed in on Arras with the aim of destroying the supplies held there. The Allies intended for this to prevent the French from fending off sieges of Arras and Cambrai. Although the Allied succeeded, the advantages gained to them were ultimately unexploited due to Austrian troops arriving too late to the Allied army.

== Background ==
In the first months of 1712, the War of the Spanish Succession was marked by disunity among the Grand Alliance. As a result of the 1710 British general election, the Whigs had been swept from power in Great Britain and replaced by the Tories, who were opposed to further involvement in the conflict. The Tory Harley ministry accused the Duke of Marlborough and his fellow Whig politicians of war profiteering; as a result, Marlborough, who had led the Allied armies in the Low Countries since 1702 was removed from office by Queen Anne under Tory pressure.

The Tories were also hostile towards the Dutch Republic, who they did not trust. In his 1711 work The Conduct of the Allies, Tory pamphleteer Jonathan Swift argued that the Dutch were ungrateful allies and a threat to Britain. In another work Swift wrote that the Dutch were in "a condition to strike terror into us, with 50,000 veterans ready to invade us from the country which we have conquered for them". When the Tory-dominated British House of Commons passed a resolution criticising the Dutch for not fulfilling prior agreements with Britain, Dutch statesman Anthonie Heinsius and his fellow regenten were outraged. The Dutch issued a reply to the resolution wherein they refuted Tory criticisms point by point, greatly embarrassing the Harley ministry.

Such disputes did not stop the Harley ministry from continuing secret peace negotiations with France. To keep their allies in the dark and maintain a strong negotiating position with France, the Harley ministry decided to participate in a new campaign in 1712, if only superficially. The Duke of Ormonde was chosen by the Harley ministry to command British troops in the Low Countries for this campaign. Although Ormonde was a veteran commander who had served under William III of England in the Nine Years' War, he was relatively inexperienced. Tory statesman Lord Oxford saw this as an advantage, as he could therefore control him more easily. Ormonde had been given secret instructions to frustrate the Allied war effort as much as possible, which would make the Dutch and Austrians more inclined to seek peace. However, the Dutch States General had no intention of allowing Ormonde to lead their army. They asked the Austrians to send Eugene of Savoy back to the Dutch Republic instead. The Austrians agreed to this and also sent an additional 20,000 men.

Marlborough, having conquered Bouchain in the previous year, had left most of his troops to occupy the outermost border towns, so that the French would be prevented from building up lines to cover their remaining lands during the winter. In January, this prompted a plan in The Hague to burn down a large hay storehouse, set up by the French within Arras, which would prevent them from getting their armies into the field early in the year. This would then allow Eugene to lay siege to Arras or Cambrai without the threat of a French army led by the Duke of Villars attacking them. The Earl of Albemarle, governor of Tournai and the most senior commander in the Dutch army in the absence of Count Tilly and Hereditary Prince of Hesse-Kassel, led the mission to Arras.

== Bombardment ==
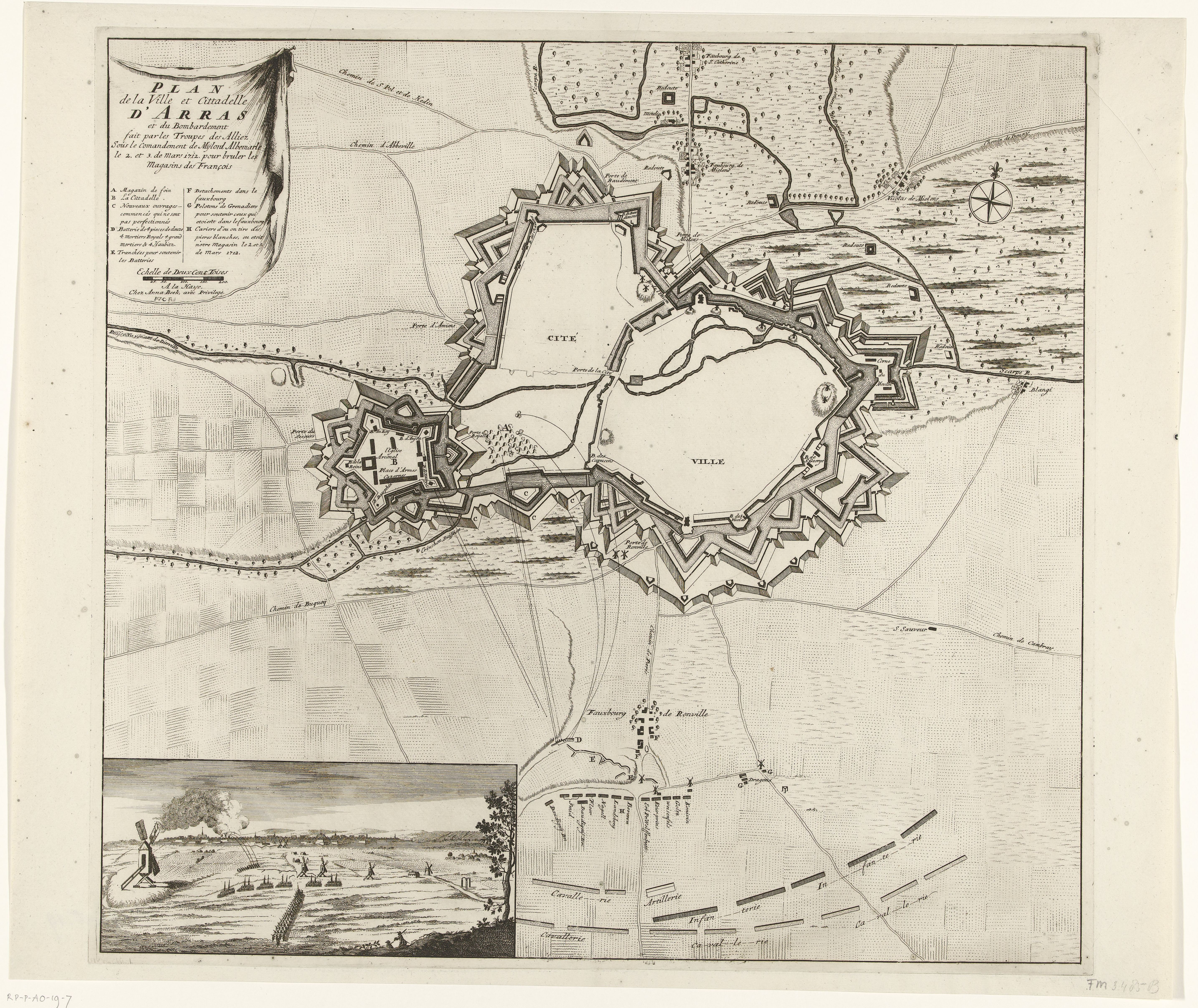
Map showing the bombardment of Arras, 1712

In Februari, Albemarle, with 36 infantry battalions and 44 cavalry squadrons, supported by Reinhard Vincent Graf von Hompesch, Frederik Sirtema van Grovestins and William Cadogan, launched a series of diversions that led the French to believe he wanted to undertake some along the river Sambre. Instead, he ordered the garrisons of Oudenaarde, Courtrai, Menen, Ath, Aire, Lille, Bethune, and Tournai to move towards Douai, where they would cross the Scarpe towards Arras. 2,000 labourers were added to this force. With this army, he left 4 o'clock in the afternoon on 1 March towards Arras. In the evening they crossed the Scarpe at Fampoux. After marching all night, Albemarle's army arrived at the plain before Arras 4 a.m. on 2 March.

There he ordered the workers to dig trenches and erect two artillery batteries. This went so smoothly that the French garrison at Atrecht under Pierre de Montesquiou d'Artagnan did not realise the encirclement of the city until the Anglo-Dutch army was fully covered and peasants brought the news to the city. D'Artagnan immediately decided to launch an attack then on Bapaume, a suburb of Arras taken by the Allies, but this attack was unsuccessful. Albemarle, on the contrary, had to wait for the heavy artillery to arrive. This arrived at 11 a.m., but it would take until 5 p.m. until the artillery barrage started. Bombs and glowing cannonballs were shot into the city.

These had the effect that the hay, straw and other supplies, which lay in thirty-six large piles on a plain between the city and the citadel, caught fire about 11 o'clock in the evening. The fire additionally consumed a large wood storehouse. Such a fire as this, which produced light burning dust, instilled fear in both the governor and the citizens that it might spread to the citadel's arsenal, and by igniting the gunpowder could destroy the whole city. D'Artagnan did herefore distribute the gunpowder in several other and safer places in all haste. Albemarle kept the firing going until three o'clock the next morning. Having fully achieved his objective, he then, 1 hour before dawn, gave the order to withdraw the artillery. The rest of the army departed in the morning at 8 o'clock with flying banners and blowing trumpets, after which he sent them all back to the towns they had previously occupied.

== Aftermath ==
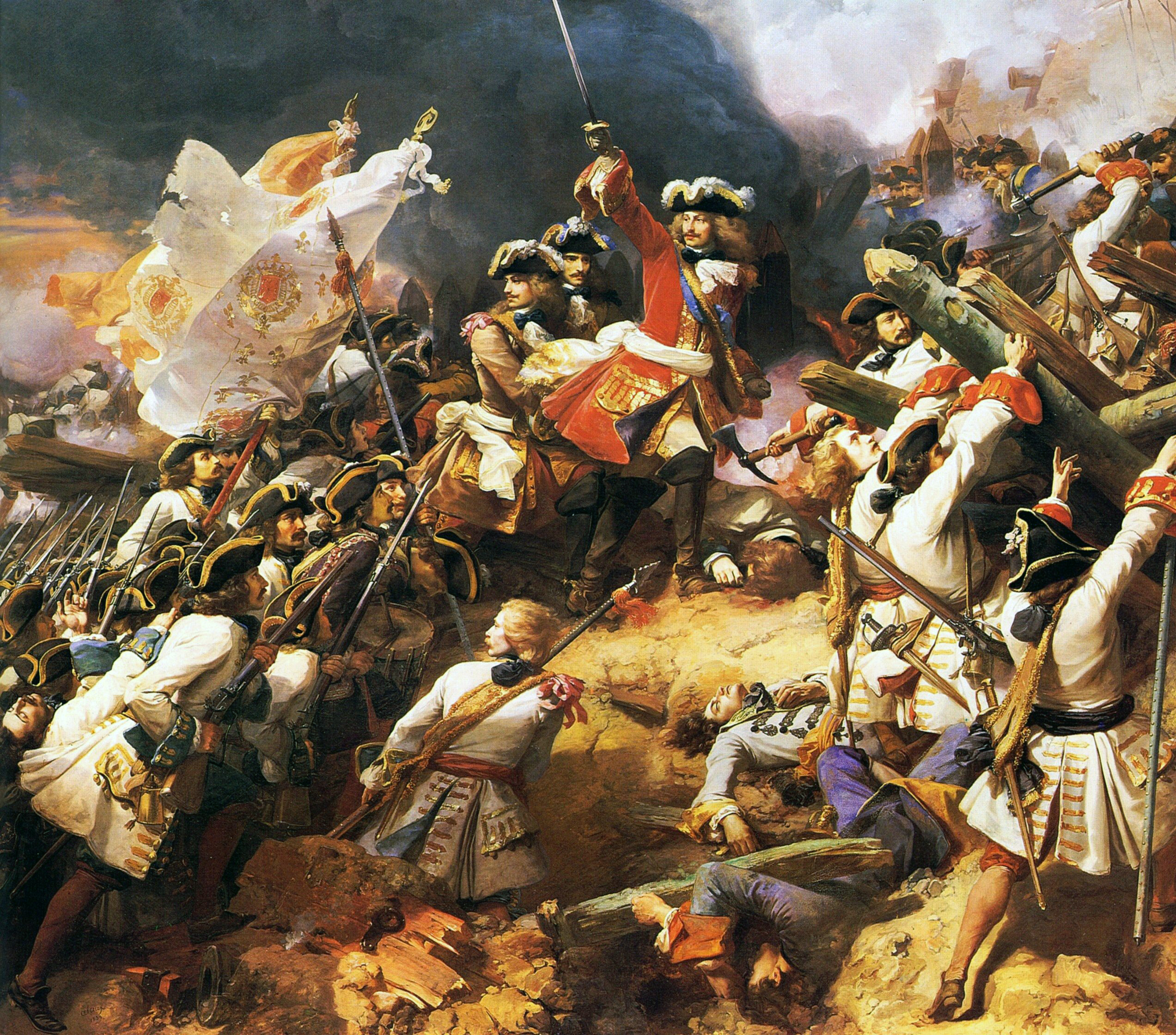
The Battle of Denain by Jean Alaux, 1839

The mission had been an undisputed success. 1 to 1.2 million rations, among other things, had gone up in flames. Albemarle wrote to the States General:

'The consternation which this expedition has caused among the enemies is incredible, and prevents her from gathering her army before the troops will be able to subsist from the land crops, and by which [they] consequently ... will not be able to prevent ... us from opening an early and advantageous campaign.'

However, to Albemarle's disappointment, this advantage was to remain entirely unexploited, as the 20,000 promised troops the Austrians would send did not arrive in the Low Countries until mid-May. Villars had by then already assembled his army in the plain between Cambrai and Arras. So instead, the Allies' campaign in 1712 would prove troublesome.

The Allies were hampered by Ormonde's reluctance to agree to any suggestions proposed by Eugene or the Dutch, which were a result of his secret orders. Although only the French had been informed by Harley ministry of the secret orders given to Ormonde, he publicly admitted to the Dutch and Austrians that he had been given "restraining orders" from his superiors in London. This embarrassed the Harley ministry, and Lord Oxford informed Britain's allies that Ormonde had misinterpreted the orders and authorised him to take part in the Allied siege of Le Quesnoy.

In June, however, Ormonde was ordered to return with his troops to Flanders. However, the 25,000–30,000 German and Danish troops in British pay refused to leave and declared to the Dutch field deputies that they would not leave the Allied army until they had received further orders from their respective sovereigns. The field deputies promised them that the Dutch Republic would pay them instead. Despite the absence of British troops, this meant that the Allies could still continue their offensive and the siege of Le Quesnoy went well for them. At the Battle of Denain, however, the Allies were defeated. This enabled Villars to recapture Le Quesnoy and other French fortresses before the armies went to winter quarters. The road to Paris thus became out of sight for the Allies and the Dutch decided it was now time to accept the Anglo-French peace proposals. On 11 April of 1713, the Peace of Utrecht was signed. The Austrians fought on until 1714 and made peace in the Peace of Rastatt.

== Sources ==
- Van Nimwegen, Olaf (2020). De Veertigjarige Oorlog 1672-1712: de strijd van de Nederlanders tegen de Zonnekoning (The 40 Years War 1672-1712: the Dutch struggle against the Sun King) (in Dutch). Prometheus. ISBN 978-90-446-3871-4.
- De Vryer, Abraham (1737). Histori van François Eugenius, prins van Savoije-Soissons (in Dutch). Loveringh en De Jonge.
- Wijn, J.W. (1964). Het Staatsche Leger: Deel VIII-3 Het tijdperk van de Spaanse Successieoorlog 1711–1715 (The Dutch States Army: Part VIII-3 The era of the War of the Spanish Succession 1711–1715) (in Dutch). Martinus Nijhoff.
