= Battle of Denain =

1712 battle of the War of the Spanish Succession

- Part of the War of the Spanish Succession
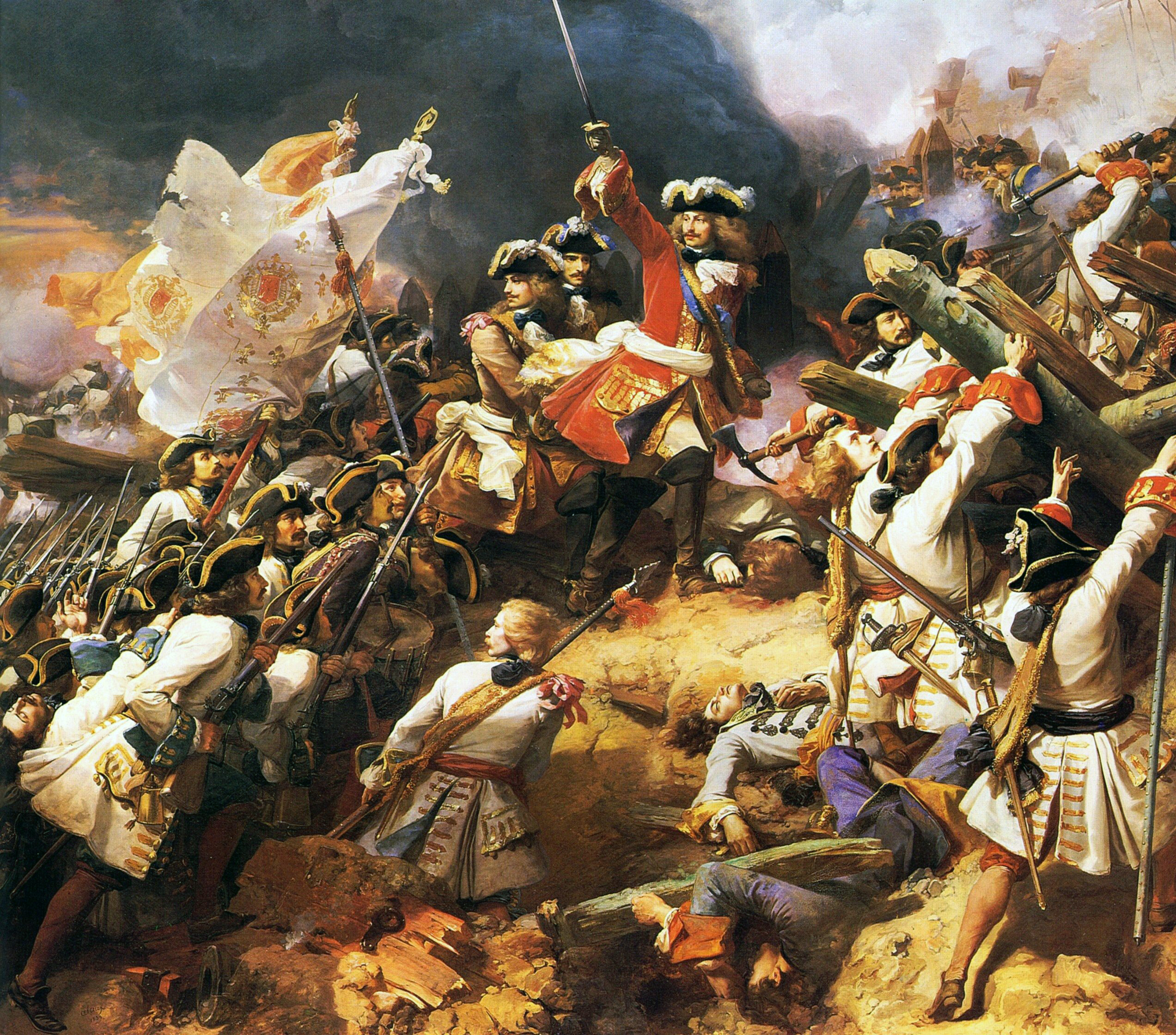
- The Battle of Denain (1839)
Date	24 July 1712
Location	Denain, France 50°20′N 3°24′E
Result	French victory
Territorial changes	French forces retake Denain.

Belligerents
France	Dutch Republic (Holy Roman Empire) Habsburg monarchy

Commanders and leaders
(Kingdom of France) Claude de Villars (Kingdom of France) Prince de Tingry	(Holy Roman Empire) Prince Eugene (Dutch Republic) Earl of Albemarle (surrendered)

Strength
70,000 total (Note: Under overall command of Villars, much of which being led by the Prince of Tingry were tasked to block the Allied attempt across the Scheldt to reinforce Denain during their attack.); 24,000–26,000 engaged at Denain	100,000 total (Note: Under overall command of Prince Eugene, much of which attempted to relieve the Allied garrison at Denain when it was attacked by the French.); 8,500–10,500 garrisoned at Denain

Casualties and losses
500–2,100 (Note: Estimates: • 500 • 2,100)	6,500–8,000 (Note: Estimates: • 6,500 • 8,000)

The Battle of Denain was fought on 24 July 1712 as part of the War of the Spanish Succession. It resulted in a French victory, under Marshal Villars, against Dutch and Austrian forces, under Prince Eugene of Savoy.

It was the war's last battle in Flanders and one of the most consequential, breaking the Grand Alliance's ability to threaten Paris and reversing nearly two years of French territorial losses. In itself a local and tactical victory, Denain was made decisive by its relentless exploitation by Villars, who skillfully maneuvered to reclaim strategic border fortifications that would blunt any allied effort to renew their advance on Paris and dictate peace terms to Louis XIV.

== Background ==
The War of Spanish Succession had raged since 1701. After over a decade of war, France was in a dark period, both financially and militarily. The early victories of Marshal Villars at the Battle of Friedlingen and the Battle of Höchstadt were followed by numerous defeats to the Allied forces, most notably the armies under Prince Eugene of Savoy and the Duke of Marlborough. In 1708, after the Battle of Oudenaarde, nearly all the strongholds of northern France were under the control of the Grand Alliance. There was also an economic crisis, and the winter of 1708-1709 was one of the most rigorous of the 18th century, leading to famine and high mortality.

The command of the French northern army went to Marshal Villars in 1709, who wasted no time in reorganising its demoralised forces. When the Allied campaign led by Prince Eugene and the Duke of Marlborough engaged the French at Malplaquet, Villars was wounded and the French retreated from the field, but the Allies suffered twice as many casualties and their campaign soon sputtered out. France's precarious position had been stabilized, the Allies were unable to achieve their goal of forcing harsh terms on the Bourbons and the war continued. In Britain, the anti-war Tories managed to gain power in 1710 and were increasingly prepared to agree terms with French negotiators. Despite this, the 1711 campaign saw Marlborough enjoy further success by leading his army through the lines Ne Plus Ultra and capturing Bouchain, a key fortress in northern France.

Marlborough had fallen out of favour with Queen Anne and his political opponents manoeuvred to have him dismissed as Captain General in December 1711.

== Prelude ==
=== Disunity in the Allied leadership ===
The first months of 1712 was marked by disunity among the Grand Alliance. As a result of the 1710 British general election, the Whigs had been swept from power in Britain and replaced by the Tories, who were opposed to further British involvement in the war. The Tory Harley ministry accused the Duke of Marlborough and his fellow Whigs of war profiteering; as a result, Marlborough, who had led the Allied armies in the Low Countries since 1702, was removed from office by Queen Anne under Tory pressure.

The Tories were also hostile towards the Dutch Republic, who they did not trust. In his 1711 work The Conduct of the Allies, the Tory pamphleteer Jonathan Swift argued that the Dutch were ungrateful allies and a threat to Britain. In another work, Swift wrote that the Dutch were in "a condition to strike terror into us, with 50,000 veterans ready to invade us from the country which we have conquered for them". The Tory-dominated British House of Commons passed a resolution criticising the Dutch for not fulfilling prior agreements with Britain, which outraged Dutch statesman Anthonie Heinsius and his fellow regenten. The Dutch issued a reply to the resolution wherein they refuted its criticisms point by point, greatly embarrassing the Harley ministry.

Such disputes did not stop the new British government from continuing secret peace negotiations with France. To keep their allies in the dark and maintain a strong negotiating position with France, the Harley ministry decided to participate in a new campaign in 1712, if only superficially. The Duke of Ormonde was chosen by the ministry to command British troops in the Low Countries for the campaign. Although a veteran commander who had served under William III of England in the Nine Years' War, Ormonde was relatively inexperienced; the Tory leader Lord Oxford saw this as an advantage, as he could therefore control him more easily. Ormonde had been given secret instructions to frustrate the Allied war effort as much as possible, which would make the Dutch and Austrians more inclined to seek peace. However, the Dutch States General did not wish for Ormonde to command Dutch troops, and requested the Austrians to send Prince Eugene of Savoy back to Holland instead. The Austrians agreed to this and sent Eugene along with an additional 20,000 soldiers.

=== Beginning of the campaign ===
The Duke of Marlborough, having conquered Bouchain in the previous year, had left most of his troops to occupy the outermost border towns, so that the French would be prevented from building up lines to cover their remaining lands during the winter. This prompted a plan in The Hague to burn down a large hay storehouse, set up by the French within Arras. This would prevent Villars from getting his armies into the field early in the year and allow Eugene to lay siege to Arras or Cambrai without the threat of a French army. On 2 and 3 March 1712, an Allied army under Arnold van Keppel, Earl of Albemarle closed in on Arras and bombarded the town. The action was a major success, but the advantage had to go entirely unused because the Emperor's troops arrived too late to the Allied army. Villars had by then already assembled his army in the plain between Cambrai and Arras.

In June, Prince Eugene besieged and captured Le Quesnoy. The Duke of Ormonde withdrew his forces during the siege, leading to a rift between Britain and the rest of the Grand Alliance. In line with their prior agreement with the French, Ormonde removed his men towards Dunkirk. However, the 25,000–30,000 German and Danish troops in British pay refused to leave and declared to the Dutch field deputies that they would not leave the Allied army until they had received further orders from their respective sovereigns. The field deputies promised them that the Dutch Republic would pay them instead. Despite the absence of British troops, this meant that the Allies could still continue their offensive and Eugene and Count Tilly concluded the siege of Le Quesnoy successfully.

Once the Allies were assured of the support of the auxiliary troops that were previously in British service, they decided the fortress of Landrecies would be the next target. Ordinarily, they would have first captured Valenciennes to secure their supply lines, ensuring a more secure siege of the city. However, the political situation left the Dutch-Imperial army with limited time to break through the French line of fortresses, compelling them to take greater risks. The Allied army's supply lines were exceedingly long and ran dangerously close to the French positions. Defending these extended lines required the army to be fragmented.

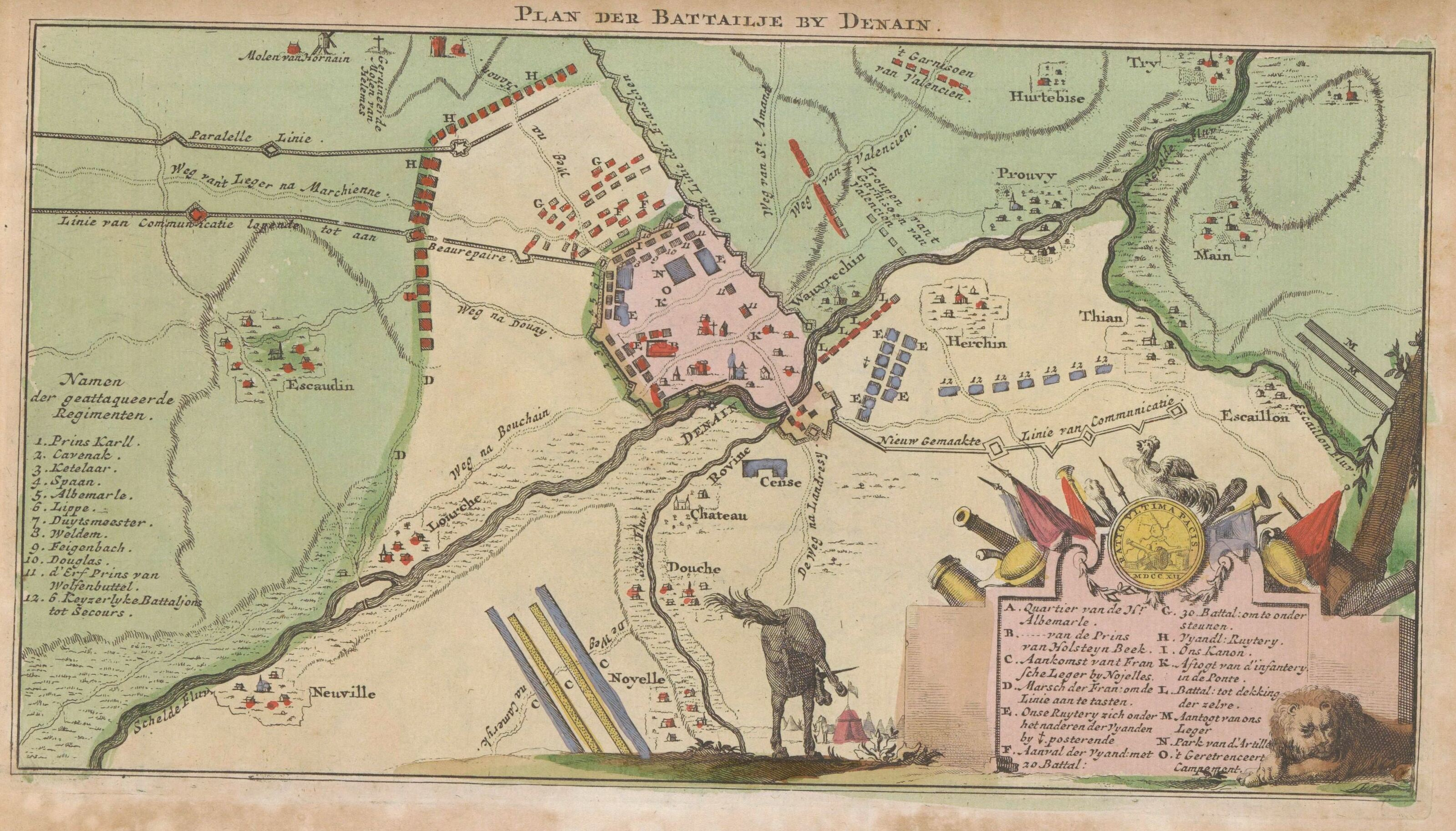
Dutch map showing the order of battle of the troops at the Battle of Denain on 24 July 1712. In the bottom right corner, a crowing French rooster stands atop the legend, beside a reclining Dutch lion and a bucking British unicorn.

The Dutch-Imperial army comprised 122 battalions and 273 squadrons totalling 100,000 men under the overall command of Prince Eugene. Although Villars initially commanded a larger force composed of 139 battalions and 249 squadrons,the situation shifted in favour of the Allies. As the defending party, Villars had to allocate 40 battalions to garrison various fortress towns. Additionally, to safeguard the interior from raids, like the one of Grovestins, he was compelled to detach 36 squadrons. Prince of Anhalt-Dessau encircled Landrecies with 34 battalions and 30 squadrons, while the main Allied force was positioned between Fontaine au Bois and Thiant. Some troops were reserved for guarding the supply line that went from Landrecies to Marchiennes.

A corps of 10 battalions and 23 squadrons under Albemarle was stationed at Denain, a fortified encampment, and not a fortress as was typically the case. It was only equipped with field fortifications that were no match for the overwhelming numerical superiority Albemarle would face. Due to the hard ground, it lacked high ramparts or a deep moat, had no outer ditch, and—perhaps most critically, despite what the painting by Jean Alaux suggest—was without a palisade. The retrenchment had been constructed to guard against sorties from Valenciennes and against smaller enemy raids. It does not appear that Albemarle and Eugene had anticipated facing a large enemy force or an entire army. Only a single pontoon bridge connected Albemarle’s encampment to the right bank of the Scheldt. Since the British had taken their bridging equipment with them, Albemarle provided the materials for a second pontoon bridge to the main army. The wooden bridge he planned as a replacement was still unfinished when the French arrived.

== Battle ==
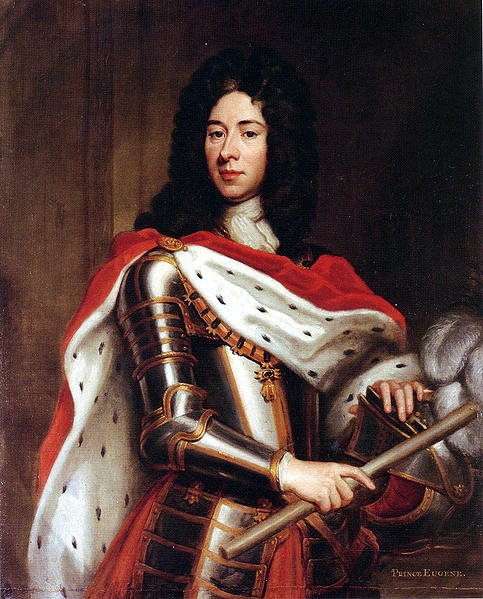
Eugene of Savoy in 1712.

After a detailed examination of the enemy dispositions, Villars decided in the greatest secrecy to attack Denain. He brought with him no more than 70,000 men under the Army of Flanders, assigned to him by the king himself, into the area. Elements of the French cavalry were sent to seize the various bridges crossing the river Selle, which ran through le Cateau to join the Scheldt opposite Denain. During the evening, a French detachment also took up positions around a mill at Haspres, blocking the river that crossed there. That night, the French infantry began to march towards Prince Eugene's forces at Landrecies. In response to the threat, Prince Eugene reinforced Landrecies, weakening the Allied right wing, under the Earl of Albemarle, which held Denain.

At dawn, however, Villars swung the line of advance of his army and aimed it behind the cover of the Selle in three columns at Denain. At five o'clock in the morning, Villars and his principal lieutenants drew up their plan of attack at Avesnes-le-Sec. They chose the windmill there as a vantage point for observation of the surrounding lowland. Villars handpicked 24,000 French infantry that he would personally lead to attack the 8,500 strong Dutch garrison at Denain.

At seven o’clock, the French infantrymen reached Neuville-sur-Escaut and were immediately ordered to seize the bridges across the Scheldt. At eight o’clock, the Allies were surprised to discover the large French presence in the area. The Earl of Albemarle, at the head of the Dutch garrison in and around Denain, warned Prince Eugene, but the Prince of Savoy was then not greatly concerned. Matters only worsened as a supply convoy of 500 wagons from the main Allied army headed to the garrison was captured en route by dragoons led by the Count of Broglie just west of the garrison. By one o'clock in the afternoon, the attack had already been started. The French sappers led the infantry against heavy fire and took Denain at the point of the bayonet. Many defenders were killed, and the remaining Dutch infantry attempted to escape across the mill bridge. However, it collapsed during the retreat, and hundreds of Allied troops drowned.

Realising the gravity of the situation, Prince Eugene attempted to force his way across the Scheldt at Prouvy to help Albemarle, committing the rest of the entire grand Allied army for the effort. However, under the command of the Prince de Tingry, the rest of the combined French army held the bridge at Prouvy against repeated Austrian attacks. Finally, as the day drew to a close, the French destroyed the bridge to prevent it falling into the hands of the enemy. That left the Prince of Savoy's army blocked on the left flank by the Scheldt, and the Allies could not counterattack to retake Denain. There, Albemarle and his staff were taken prisoner, together with some 4,100 troops. The Allies suffered 6,500 to 8,000 losses, mostly borne by the Dutch, while French casualties were 500 to 2,100.

== Aftermath ==
The battle was not immediately recognised to be as decisive as it turned out to be; most of Prince Eugene's army was relatively unscathed. However, with the loss of Denain, the Allied position began to unravel, and over the next few months, the French recovered Le Quesnoy, Marchines, Douai, and Bouchain.

Almost immediately, Villars began a siege of the key allied supply base at Marchiennes, whose 100 cannon fell into French hands along with up to 9,000 prisoners and large volumes of stores and equipment. This movement threatened Eugene's line of communications, compelling the Austrians to lift the siege of Landrecies and retire north. Villars responded by seizing Douai (31 July) and Le Quesnoy (8 October) after short sieges. The loss of Le Quesnoy alone cost the Allies 3,000 killed or wounded. Villars next moved against Bouchain, the site of Marlborough's last triumph, taking the city 19 October. This had the effect of reestablishing a part of the pré carré, the vital double-line of fortifications protecting Paris, dashing any remaining allied hopes of bringing Louis XIV to terms by a march on the French capital.

When news of the victory reached Versailles, the court erupted in an outpouring of joy; Louis XIV was reportedly so moved that, for the first time in his sixty-year reign, the monarch thanked his courtiers for their support. With Louis XIV's realm secure, the decade-long war in Flanders came to a close. Few other theatres held comparable promise for advancing the Allied war aims: in the Alps, Marshal Berwick with some 35,000 men safely contained the opposing 50,000 Austrians and Savoyards; in Catalonia, the Allies under Starhemberg were reeling after defeats at Brihuega and Villaviciosa; on the Portuguese frontier, the remaining Anglo-Portuguese army was falling back before a Spanish army under the Marquis de Bay, removing the last serious threat to Philip V's succession; on the Rhine, the Duke of Württemberg could only bombard French lines, to which the French responded with cavalry raids into Germany before both sides settled into winter quarters.

Against this backdrop, the Dutch joined the British in negotiating a separate peace with Louis XIV, forcing Eugene to march the Imperial army back to Germany to continue the war in the Rhineland. When Villars and Eugene renewed operations in this new theatre the following season, the Frenchman again emerged victorious, taking the strongpoints of Freiburg and Landau and compelling the Emperor to sue for peace. The two men were then given power to negotiate a peace agreement and eventually drew up the terms of the Treaty of Rastatt, which finally brought the last of the fighting to an end. Eugene's reputation soon recovered when he won a major victory by defeating the Turks at the 1717 Siege of Belgrade.

== Sources ==
- Cook, Chris; Stevenson, John (2016). British Historical Facts: 1688-1760. Palgrave Macmillan UK. ISBN 978-1349023691.
- Chandler, David G. Marlborough as Military Commander. Spellmount Ltd, (2003). ISBN 1-86227-195-X
- Clodfelter, M. (2017). Warfare and Armed Conflicts: A Statistical Encyclopedia of Casualty and Other Figures, 1492–2015 (4th ed.). Jefferson, North Carolina: McFarland. ISBN 978-0786474707.
- Dupuy, Richard Ernest; Dupuy, Trevor Nevitt (1977). The Encyclopedia of Military History From 3500 B.C. to the Present. Harper & Row. ISBN 978-0060111397.
- Eggenberger, David (2012). An Encyclopedia of Battles Accounts of Over 1,560 Battles from 1479 B.C. to the Present. Dover Publications. ISBN 978-0486142012.
- Lynn, John A. (1999). The Wars of Louis XIV: 1667–1714. London: Longman. ISBN 0-582-05629-2.
- Henderson, Nicholas. Prince Eugen of Savoy. Weifenfeld and Nicolson, 1964.
- Chase Maenius. The Art of War[s]: Paintings of Heroes, Horrors and History. 2014. ISBN 978-1320309554
- Van Nimwegen, Olaf (2020). De Veertigjarige Oorlog 1672–1712: de strijd van de Nederlanders tegen de Zonnekoning (The 40 Years War 1672–1712: the Dutch struggle against the Sun King) (in Dutch). Prometheus. ISBN 978-90-446-3871-4.
- De Vryer, Abraham (1737). Histori van François Eugenius, prins van Savoije-Soissons (in Dutch). Loveringh en De Jonge.
- Wijn, J.W. (1964). Het Staatsche Leger: Deel VIII-3 Het tijdperk van de Spaanse Successieoorlog 1711–1715 (The Dutch States Army: Part VIII-3 The era of the War of the Spanish Succession 1711–1715) (in Dutch). Martinus Nijhoff.
- Sturgill, Claude C. (1965). Marshal Villars and the War of the Spanish Succession. University of Kentucky Press. ISBN 978-0813111025.
- Vault, François Eugène de; Pelet-Clozeau, François Eugène de Jean-Jacques Germain (1862). Mémoires militaires relatifs à la Succession d'Espagne sous Louis XIV. Vol. 11. Impr. Royale. Archived from the original on 27 July 2024.
