= Arnold van Keppel, 1st Earl of Albemarle =

Dutch States Army officer

The Right Honourable The Earl of Albermarle
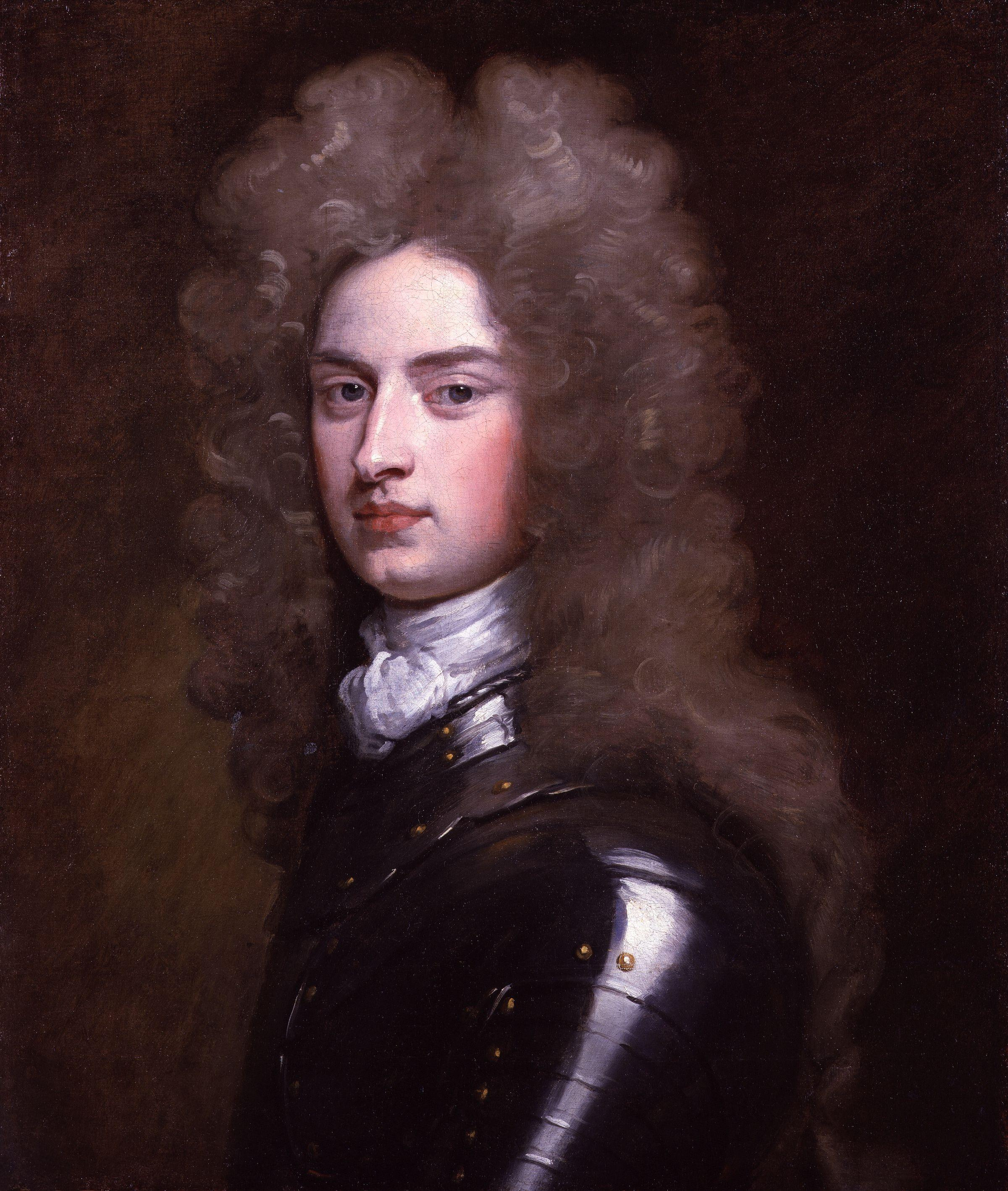
- The Earl c. 1700
- Born: Arnold Joost van Keppel; January 1670; Zutphen, Dutch Republic
- Died: 30 May 1718 (aged 48)
- Spouse: Geertruid Johanna Quirina van der Duyn
- Issue Detail: Willem van Keppel, 2nd Earl of Albemarle; Sophia van Keppel
- Father: Oswald van Keppel
- Mother: Anna Geertruid van Lintelo
- Military career
- Allegiance: Dutch Republic
- Service years: 1702–1718
- Conflicts: Nine Years' War; War of the Spanish Succession; Capture of Liège; Passage of the Lines of Brabant; Battle of Ramillies; Siege of Ostend; Battle of Oudenarde; Siege of Lille; Crossing of the Scheldt; Siege of Tournai; Battle of Malplaquet; Siege of Aire; Bombardment of Arras; Battle of Denain

Arnold Joost van Keppel, 1st Earl of Albemarle (January 1670 – 30 May 1718) was a Dutch States Army officer who fought for William III of England and became the first Earl of Albemarle. He had a very close relationship with William and proved a capable cavalry commander. In the latter stages of the War of the Spanish Succession he sometimes assumed Dutch supreme command in absence of Claude Frédéric t'Serclaes, Count of Tilly.

== Life ==
Arnold Joost van Keppel was born in the De Voorst country house near Zutphen in the Dutch Republic. Born in 1670 and was the heir of a junior branch of an ancient and noble family in Gelderland; the son of Oswald van Keppel and his wife Anna Geertruid van Lintelo. De Voorst is a large country house near Zutphen, financed by William III, and not unlike the royal palace Het Loo in Apeldoorn. He achieved fame and wealth as the right-hand man of William III of Orange. He became the page of honour to William III in his mid-teens, possibly as early as 1685. It has been claimed that he was William's lover, but no conclusive evidence has been discovered. Keppel accompanied William to England in the Glorious Revolution of 1688.

While some have suggested their association began when Keppel was only 16, others argue a later date, possibly at the time of a hunting accident when he is said to have attracted the king's attention by his uncomplaining demeanour upon breaking a leg. Public commentary on the relationship intensified in 1692 when Keppel began to receive grants of land from the king. He became Groom of the Bedchamber and Master of the Robes in 1695. In 1696, he was created the Viscount Bury in Lancashire, and the Baron Ashford of Ashford, Kent. On 10 February 1697, William made Van Keppel the Earl of Albemarle. In 1699, he was awarded the command of the First Life Guards.

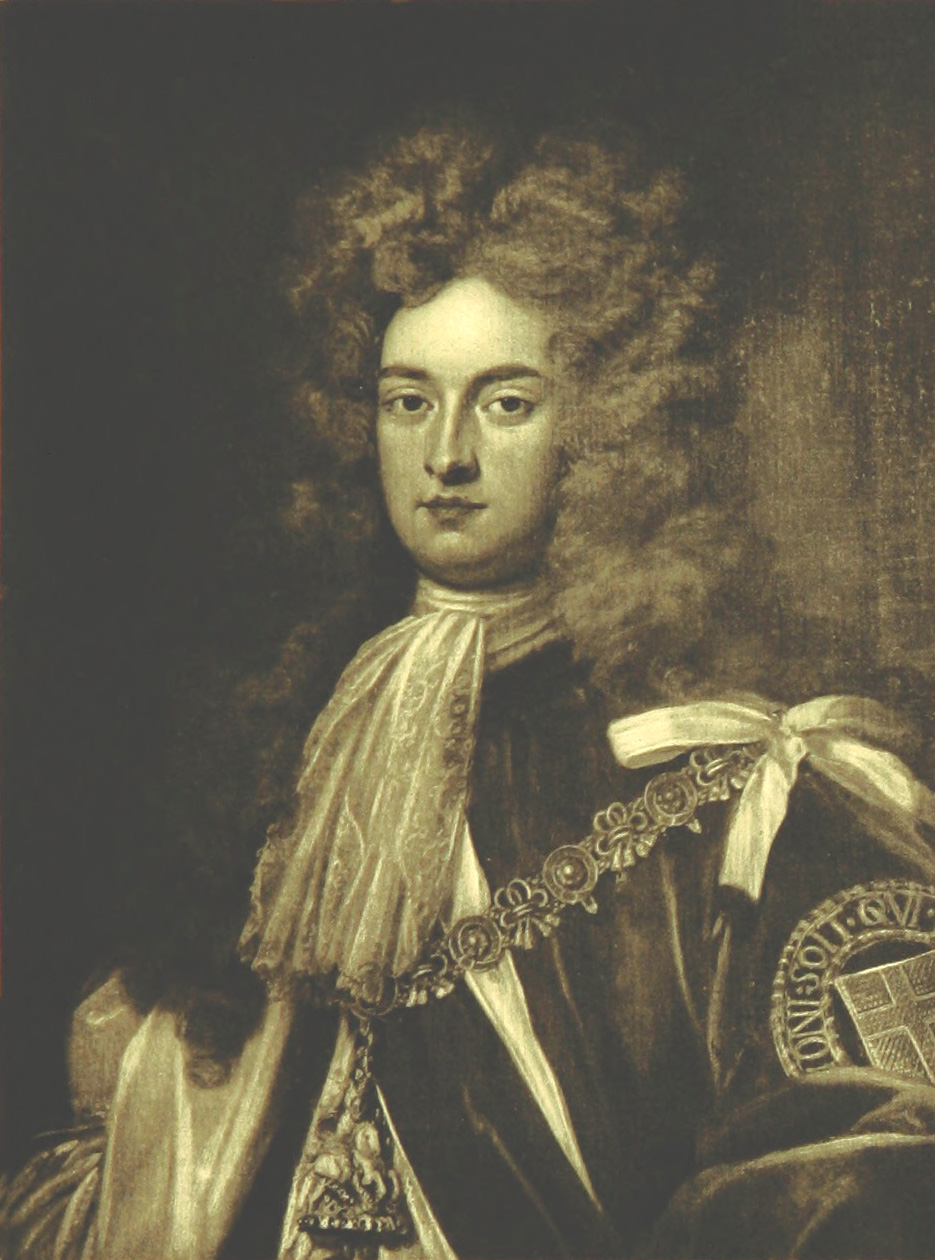
Arnold van Keppel in 1698

In 1700, William gave Albemarle extensive lands in Ireland, but Parliament obliged the king to cancel this grant. William instead granted him £50,000. The same year he was created a Knight of the Garter. He served both with the English and Dutch troops, was a major-general in 1697, colonel of several regiments and governor of 's-Hertogenbosch.

Handsome and engaging, he rivalled Portland (whose jealousy he aroused in the royal favour), possessed William's full confidence, and accompanied him everywhere. In February 1702 William, then prostrated with his last illness, sent Albemarle to the Netherlands to arrange the coming campaign, and he only returned in time to receive William's last commissions on his deathbed, including being entrusted with the king's private papers.

After the death of William III, who bequeathed to him ƒ200,000 and the lordship of Bredevoort, Albemarle returned to the Netherlands, took his seat as a noble in the States-General, and became a general of cavalry in the Dutch army. He joined the forces of the allies in 1702 in the War of Spanish Succession, was present at the Battle of Ramillies in 1706, and at Oudenaarde in 1708, and distinguished himself at the Siege of Lille. He commanded at the siege of Aire in 1710, led Marlborough's second line in 1711, and was general of the Dutch forces in early 1712. As commander of the Dutch forces he successfully bombarded Arras and destroyed much of the French supplies there, but he was defeated at Denain after the withdrawal of Ormonde and the English forces and taken prisoner. He died on 30 May 1718, at the age of forty-eight.

== Family ==
Albemarle married Geertruid Johanna Quirina van der Duyn, daughter of Major General Scravenmore (an anglicisation of 's Gravenmoer) who served as an officer in the Danish Auxiliary Corps in the Williamite War in Ireland.

- William Anne, who succeeded him as 2nd Earl of Albemarle. He married the granddaughter of Charles II of England.
- Sophia (1716–1773), who married General John Thomas (son of Sir Edmond Thomas, 2nd Bt.). They had at least two sons. The younger son, Colonel Charles Nassau Thomas, became Vice-Chamberlain to George IV, when he was Prince of Wales and Prince Regent.

== Arms ==
Coat of arms of Arnold van Keppel, 1st Earl of Albemarle
Coronet Coronet of an Earl. Crest Out of a ducal coronet or, a swan's head and neck argent. Escutcheon Gules, three escallops argent. Supporters Two lions ducally crowned or. Motto Ne cede malis (Yield not to adversity)

== Sources ==
- Falkner, James (2014). Marlborough's War Machine, 1702–1711. Pen & Sword Military. ISBN 9781473842953.

Military offices
Preceded by The Earl of Scarbrough	Captain and Colonel of His Majesty's Own Troop of Horse Guards; 1699–1710	Succeeded by The Earl of Portland
Court offices
Preceded by William Nassau de Zuylestein	Master of the Robes; 1695–1701	Succeeded by Cornelius Nassau
Peerage of England
New creation	Earl of Albemarle; 1697–1718	Succeeded by William van Keppel
