= Reinhard Vincent Graf von Hompesch =

Dutch States Army officer and nobleman

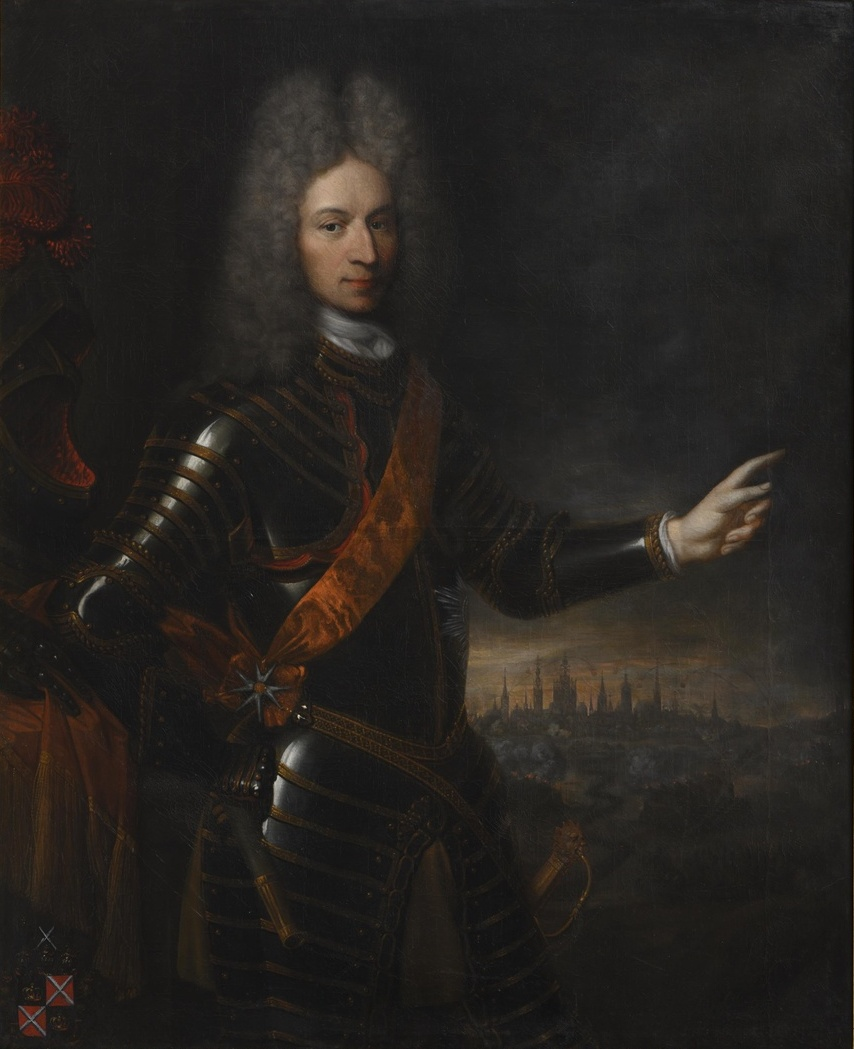
- Reinhard Vincent von Hompesch (1660–1733)
- Born: 1660
- Died: 20 January 1733 (aged 72–73) 's-Hertogenbosch
- Father: Johann Dietrich II von Hompesch zu Bollheim und Rurich
- Mother: Anna Louisa von Ketzgen

Military service
- Battles/wars: Nine Years' War; War of the Spanish Succession; Battle of Ekeren; Battle of Speyerbach; Battle of Schellenberg; Battle of Blenheim; Battle of Elixheim; Battle of Ramillies; Battle of Oudenarde; Battle of Malplaquet; Bombardment of Arras; Siege of Douai

Reinhard Vincent Graf von Hompesch (1660 – 20 January 1733) was a Dutch States Army officer and nobleman who served as the governor of Luxembourg, Namur and ’s-Hertogenbosch. His parents were Johann Dietrich II von Hompesch zu Bollheim and Rurich and Anna Louisa von Ketzgen.

== Life ==
Hompesch was a member of the Protestant Hompesch zu Bollheim und Rurich family, an aristocratic family from the duchies of Juliers and Berg in Westphalia, in the lower-Rhine border region between Germany and the Netherlands. He had many siblings, two of whom also chose a military career.

By 1691 von Hompesch was a major in the Dutch Horse Guards, becoming Colonel of that regiment in 1711. On 6 July 1698, he was appointed to the position of Master of the Buckhounds under William III of England. In 1701 he was appointed major general. During the war of the Spanish Succession War he fought at the Battle of Ekeren (1703), and in the following year in the rank of Lieutenant General at the Battle of Blenheim, where he commanded the second line of cavalry. Thereafter Marlborough appointed him and Major General Jacques-Louis, comte de Noyelles et de Fallais (who had commanded a cavalry brigade at Blenheim) to command of the Trier area. Von Hompesch fortified Trier and occupied Saarbrücken.

In 1704 he became commander of the Grave region. In 1705 and 1706 he commanded the Meuse region. For his services in 1706 he was elevated by Emperor Joseph I to the rank of count. In 1708 he fought at Oudenarde and in 1709 at Malplaquet.

In July 1710 he became governor of Douai after the Allied victory in the siege of the city, which had lasted from April to June. When he covered the repulse of the allies from the neighbouring town of Arleux on 28 July 1711, his forces were thrown back to Douai, but in counterattack opened the way to France for the Allies by occupying an important bridge.

Hompesch was still in command of Douai two years later when the French retook it after a relatively brief siege. Hompesch had insufficient forces to be able to mount a lengthy resistance, while the population, who did not appreciate martial law under a Protestant occupying force, hoped for a rapid end to hostilities. Villars having refused to grant the defeated Governor the honours of war, Hompesch and the entire garrison were taken prisoner on 29 July 1712 and the French captured a large quantity of cannons and ammunition.

In 1713 Hompesch was appointed Governor of Luxembourg, then in 1714 of Namur, and finally of ’s-Hertogenbosch from 1718 until his death in 1733. On 12 April 1723 he was promoted General of Cavalry. In 1732, when tensions with Prussia were high, Hompesch became the supreme commander of the whole Dutch States Army and conducted a number of exercises on the border meant as a show of force. In 1721 he bought the estate and castle of Stevensweert, where he died in 1733.

In 1721 he was an extraordinary envoy to the general states in Berlin, where he was awarded the Order of the Black Eagle. Later, in 1725 he undertook a second diplomatic mission, this time for the Dutch government, when he negotiated with Simon Henry Adolph, Count of Lippe-Detmold for the purchase by Holland of the Dutch lordships of Vianen and Ameide - a trade which the heavily indebted duke could not refuse.

== Family ==
Hompesch had two brothers who chose a military career like him, Adrien Gustave, killed at the siege of Douai in 1710 and Adam Adrien Louis (1678-1733), who also rose to the rank of general, first in the service of Holland and then of Prussia. In addition, one of his descendants, Ferdinand von Hompesch zu Bolheim (1744-1805), was the last Grand Master of the Order of Hospitallers of St. John of Jerusalem.
