= The Storming of Valenciennes =

Painting by Jean Alaux

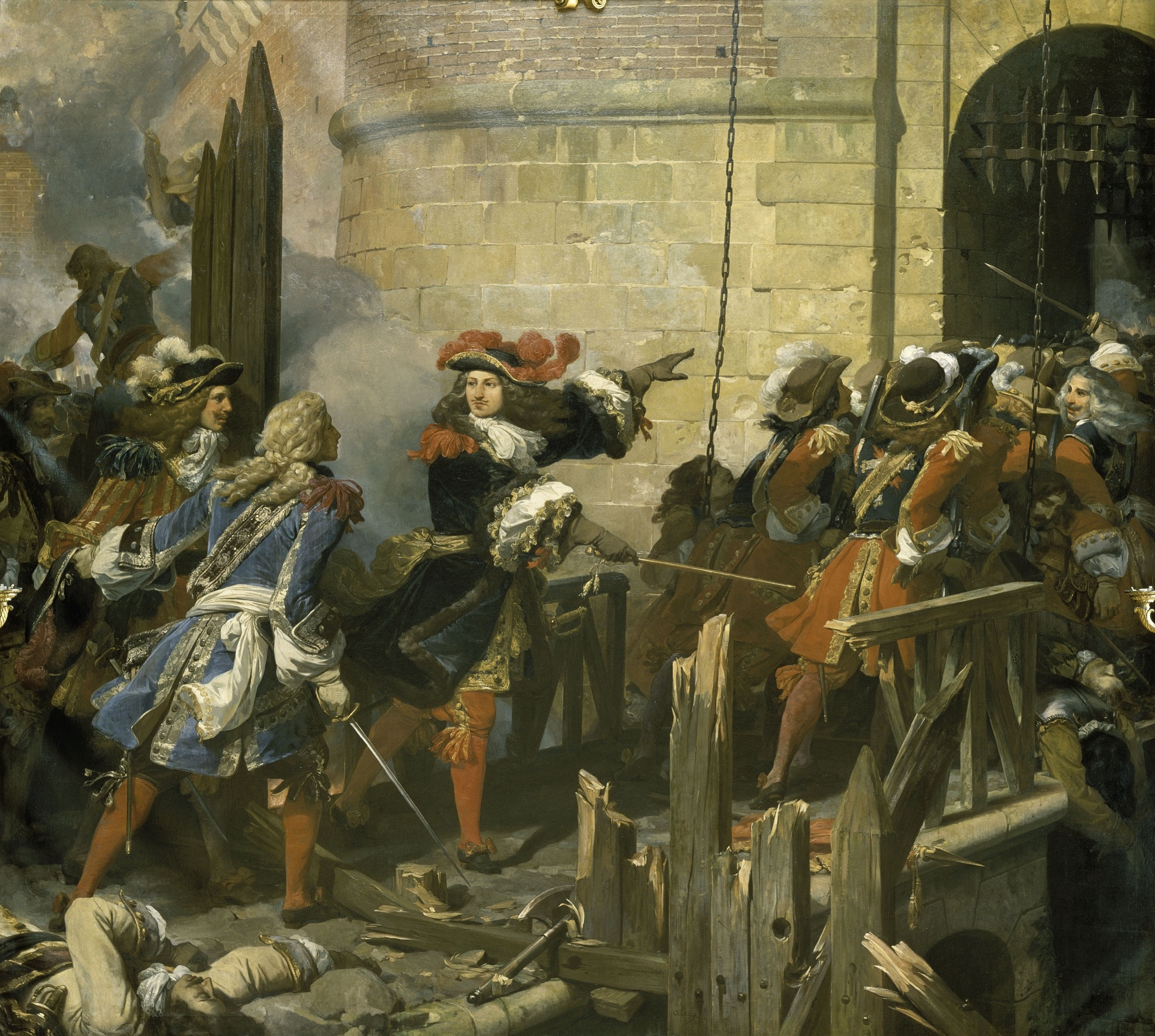
- Artist: Jean Alaux
- Year: 1837
- Type: Oil on canvas, history painting
- Dimensions: 415 cm × 465 cm (163 in × 183 in)
- Location: Palace of Versailles, Versailles

The Storming of Valenciennes (French: Prise de Valenciennes) is an oil on canvas history painting by the French artist Jean Alaux, from 1837.

== History and description ==
The scene is set during the Siege of Valenciennes in the Franco-Dutch War when Habsburg Spain fought on the Dutch side. A French Army force directed by Marshal Vauban converted the earlier blockade into a formal siege. The picture reimagines the moment on 17 March 1677 when French troops including the Musketeers of the Guard managed to overrun the weakened walls of the city, forcing the Spanish to surrender. The painting gives the impression that Louis XIV led the storming parties wheras he really watched from a distance. The town was ceded to France at the Treaty of Nijmegen.

The painting was commissioned for the new Musée de l'Histoire de France at the Palace of Versailles. This was part of a wholesale scheme to glorify key moments in French History undertaken by the July Monarchy of Louis Philippe I.The picture was displayed at the Salon of 1838 held at the Louvre in Paris. It now hangs in the Galerie des Batailles at Versailles.

== Bibliography ==
- Coutagne, Denis. François-Marius Granet, 1775-1849: Une vie pour la peinture. Somogy éditions d'art, 2008.
- Gervereau, Laurent. La guerre sans dentelles. Skira-Flammarion, 2009.
