= Siege of Valenciennes (1676–1677) =

1677 siege of the Franco-Dutch War

- Part of the Franco-Dutch War
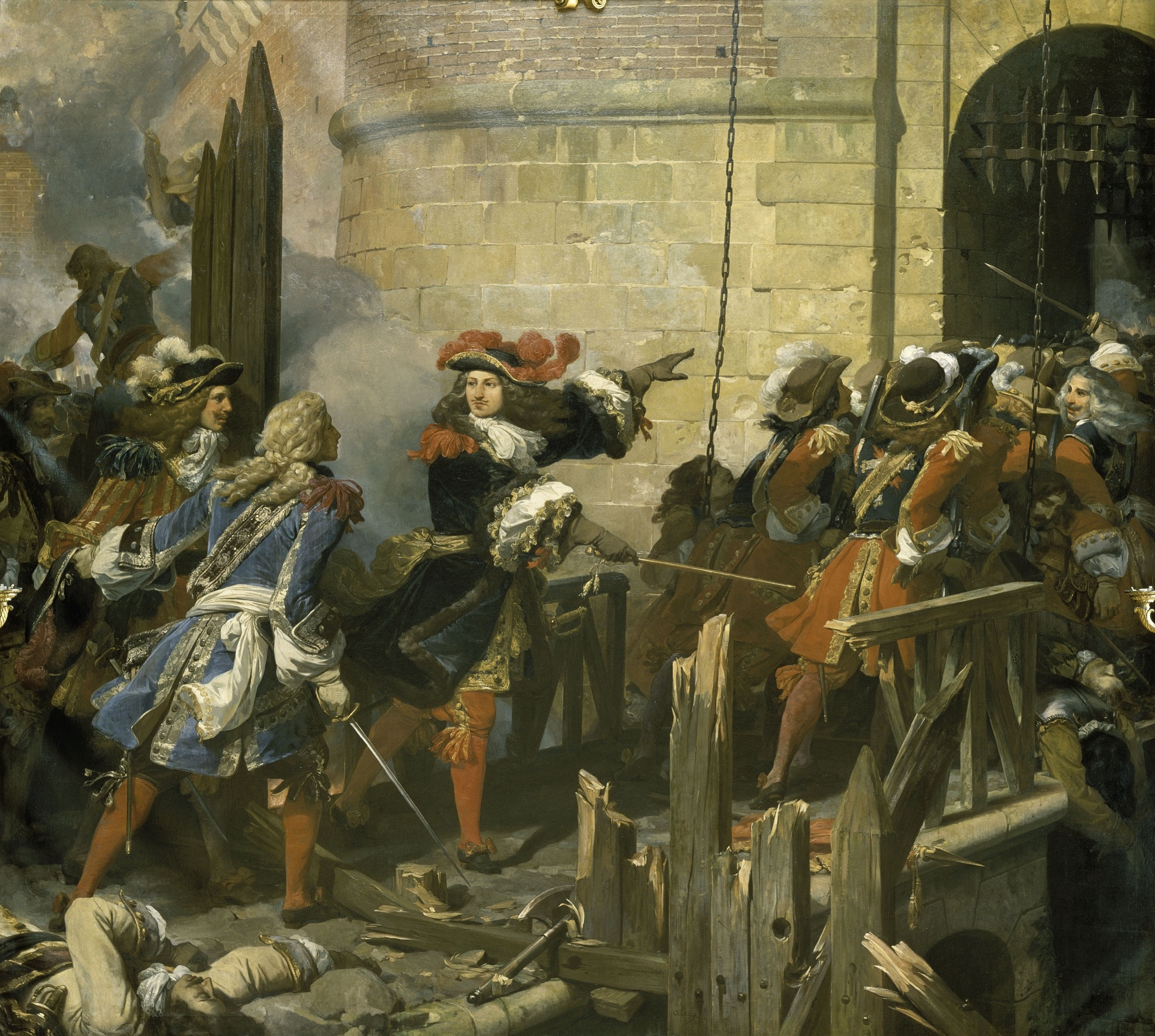
- The Storming of Valenciennes (1837)
Date	28 February–17 March 1677
Location	Valenciennes, County of Hainaut
Result	French victory

Belligerents
France	Spain

Commanders and leaders
Luxembourg; Vauban	Richebourg

Strength
c. 35,000	1,150 plus 2,000–3,000 auxiliaries

Casualties and losses
Unknown	Unknown

The Siege of Valenciennes, 28 February to 17 March 1677, took place during the 1672 to 1678 Franco-Dutch War. Valenciennes, then in the Spanish Netherlands, was assaulted by a French army under Luxembourg, with siege operations conducted by Vauban. Over the winter of 1676 to 1677, Valenciennes had been subjected to a tight blockade, preventing the receipt of reinforcements or supplies. With no hope of support, the town surrendered on 17 March, and was formally ceded by Spain to France under the August 1678 Treaty of Nijmegen.

== Background ==
In the 1667–1668 War of Devolution, Louis XIV of France occupied much of the Spanish Netherlands and Franche-Comté. Under pressure from the Dutch Republic, England and Sweden, he relinquished most of these gains in the Treaty of Aix-la-Chapelle. Before trying again, Louis decided to split the so-called Triple Alliance by paying Sweden to remain neutral. In 1670, he also signed an alliance with Charles II of England against the Dutch in the 1670 Secret Treaty of Dover.

When France invaded the Dutch Republic in May 1672, they initially seemed to have won an overwhelming victory, but the Dutch position stabilised. Concern at French gains brought them support from Frederick William of Brandenburg-Prussia, Emperor Leopold and Charles II of Spain. France retained the Dutch stronghold of Maastricht, but withdrew from the Netherlands in 1673, additional fronts opening in the Rhineland and the Spanish Pyrenees.

Key locations in Northern France and the Spanish Netherlands

The French position weakened in early 1674, when Denmark–Norway joined the Alliance in January, followed by the February Treaty of Westminster making peace between Britain and the Dutch Republic. Despite this, by the end of 1674, France had re-captured Franche-Comté, and made significant gains in Alsace; the focus now changed to consolidation. An effective Allied response in Flanders was hampered by power struggles in Madrid, whose control over the Spanish Netherlands was by now largely nominal.

Peace talks had begun at Nijmegen in 1676 but Louis' policy was to take the offensive before agreeing terms and negotiate from strength; the French quickly captured Condé-sur-l'Escaut, Bouchain, Maubeuge and Bavay. The capture of Condé and Bouchain allowed them to blockade Valenciennes and Cambrai; their cavalry fought skirmishes with the Spanish garrisons and devastated the villages around the towns. Marshal Schomberg, commander of the French field army in Flanders, proposed taking Cambrai in August but was ordered to relieve Maastricht, then under siege by the Dutch.

The plan for 1677 was to take Valenciennes, Cambrai and Saint-Omer; this would complete the French frontière de fer or "iron border," which Louis calculated would leave the Dutch little reason to continue. To confuse his opponents, the French king travelled to Metz on 7 February, where he inspected the Army of the Moselle, now commanded by Schomberg. Over the winter, Marquis de Louvois assembled supply depots along the border with the Spanish Netherlands, allowing the campaign to open in February, a month earlier than usual. In late February, a detachment of 12,000 men besieged Saint Omer, while the main army of 35,000 men under duc de Luxembourg surrounded Valenciennes, where they were joined by Louis.

== Battle ==
Valenciennes was positioned on the Rhonelle, a tributary of the Scheldt, a major trade route giving access to the sea at Antwerp. Until the advent of railways in the 19th century, goods and supplies were largely transported by water and campaigns often focused on gaining access to these. Its governor, the Marquis de Richebourg, was an experienced soldier and brother of the Prince d'Epinoy, senior members of the French-speaking nobility in the Spanish Netherlands. He had around 1,150 regular troops, plus two to three thousand civilian auxiliaries and adequate supplies of food and arms. However, his position was hopeless without relief, while the Dutch were still assembling troops and supplies. Since even the best defended town could not be held indefinitely, his objective was to occupy the attacking force as long as possible.

Operations were directed by Vauban, employing the siege parallel pioneered at Maastricht in 1673. The bombardment began on 1 March, but siege works were delayed by heavy rain. For propaganda purposes, Louis often appeared at major sieges and joined Luxembourg at Valenciennes, along with other subordinate commanders including his brother, Philippe of Orléans, d'Humières and La Feuillade.

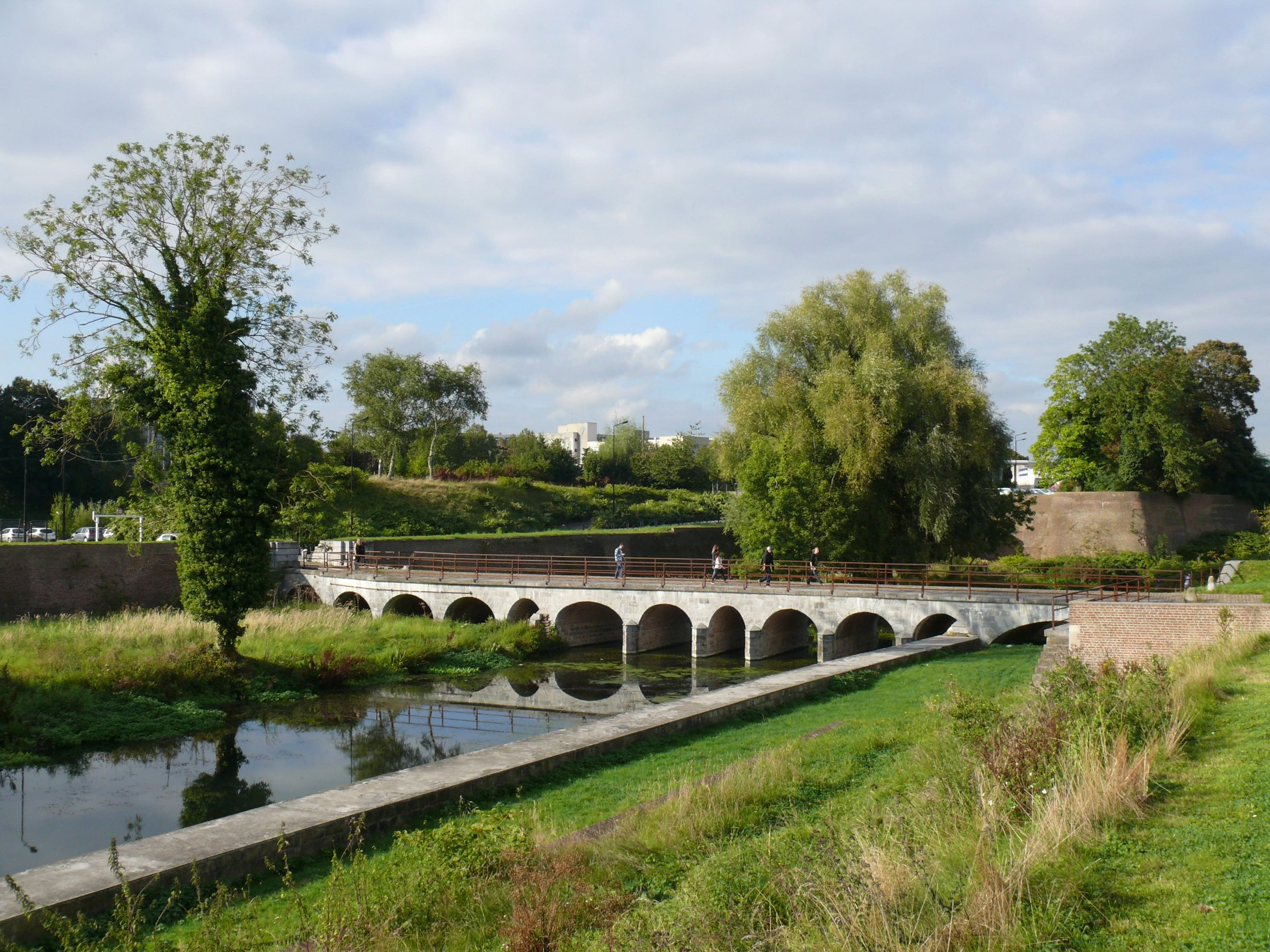
Valenciennes; the remains of the Citadel

Work on the trenches finally began on 8 March, preparing for an assault on the Porte d'Anzin, the strongest part of the defences but where the ground was driest. By 16 March, Vauban felt they were close enough to launch an attack, and proposed they do so by day. Normal practice was to do so at night, but he argued it would also surprise the defenders, while allowing better co-ordination among the attacking force.

His plan was approved, and the French artillery kept up a continuous bombardment during the night of 16th/17th, while an assault force of 4,000 moved into the trenches, including the elite Musketeers of the Guard. At 9:00 a.m. on 17 March, the attackers formed two columns and stormed the walls; they achieved complete surprise and quickly over-ran the defenders, capturing a bridge over the Rhonelle that controlled access to the main city. Both sides wanted to minimise the damage that would follow an assault, since Louis intended to annex it to France, while the conventions of siege warfare shielded a town from being sacked if the defenders yielded once 'a practicable breach' had been made. Richebourg promptly surrendered, and Luxembourg withdrew the attacking troops after the city council agreed to pay a ransom.

== Aftermath ==
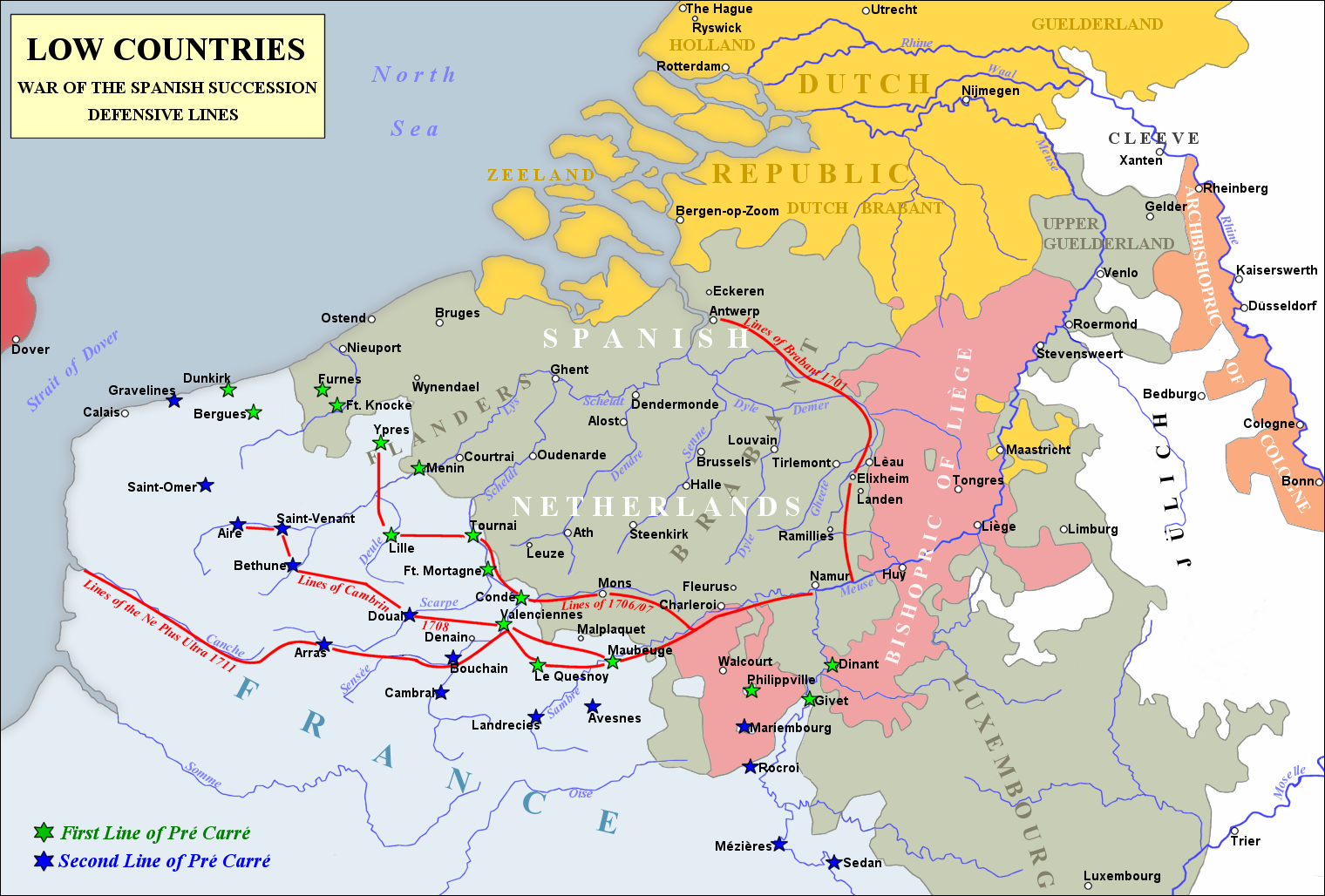
Post-1675, French strategy in Flanders was to create the line of fortresses Vauban called frontière de fer.or 'iron border'

After Valenciennes surrendered on 17 March, the main army moved onto Cambrai. An attempt by William of Orange to relieve Saint-Omer was defeated at Cassel on 11 April and Cambrai surrendered on 17 April, followed by Saint-Omer on 20 April.

Superior logistics allowed the French to make gains early in the campaigning season, before the Allies could mobilise, then consolidate. The capture of Valenciennes and Cambrai largely completed their 1677 objectives in Flanders. The peace talks at Nijmegen were given a greater sense of urgency in November after William's marriage to his cousin Mary, niece of Charles II of England. An Anglo-Dutch defensive alliance followed in March 1678, although English troops did not arrive in significant numbers until late May; Louis used this opportunity to capture Ypres and Ghent in early March, before signing a peace treaty with the Dutch on 10 August.

The war with the Dutch officially ended on 10 August 1678 with the signing of the Treaties of Nijmegen, although a combined Dutch-Spanish army attacked the French at Saint-Denis on 13 August. The agreement ensured Spain retained Mons and on 19 September, they signed their own treaty with France, ceding Saint-Omer, Cassel, Aire, Ypres, Cambrai, Valenciennes and Maubeuge. With the exception of Ypres, returned to Spain in 1697, this fixed France's northern frontier close to where it remains today but the Treaties of Nijmegen proved the highpoint of French expansion under Louis XIV.

== Sources ==
- Afflerbach, Holger; Strachan, Hew, eds. (2012). How Fighting Ends: A History of Surrender. OUP. ISBN 978-0199693627.
- Childs, John (1991). The Nine Years' War and the British Army, 1688–1697: The Operations in the Low Countries (2013 ed.). Manchester University Press. ISBN 0719089964.
- Davenport, Frances (1917). European Treaties bearing on the History of the United States and its Dependencies.
- De Périni, Hardÿ (1896). Batailles françaises Volume V. Ernest Flammarion.
- Lesaffer, Randall. "The Wars of Louis XIV in Treaties (Part V): The Peace of Nijmegen (1678–1679)". Oxford Public International Law.
- Lynn, John (1996). The Wars of Louis XIV, 1667–1714 (Modern Wars in Perspective). Longman. ISBN 978-0582056299.
- Nolan, Cathal (2008). Wars of the age of Louis XIV, 1650–1715. ABC-CLIO. ISBN 978-0-313-33046-9.
- Satterfield, George (2003). Princes, Posts and Partisans: The Army of Louis XIV and Partisan Warfare in the Netherlands (1673–1678). Brill. ISBN 978-9004131767.
- Smith, Rhea (1965). Spain; A Modern History. University of Michigan Press. ISBN 978-0472071500.
- Van Nimwegen, Olaf (2010). The Dutch Army and the Military Revolutions, 1588–1688 (Warfare in History). Boydell Press. ISBN 978-1843835752.
- Visconti Primi, Jean Baptiste (1678). La campagne du roy en l'année 1677 (2018 ed.). Hachette Livre-BNF. ISBN 978-2012679610.
- Young, William (2004). International Politics and Warfare in the Age of Louis XIV and Peter the Great. iUniverse. ISBN 978-0595813988.
