= The Battle of Denain =

Painting by Jean Alaux

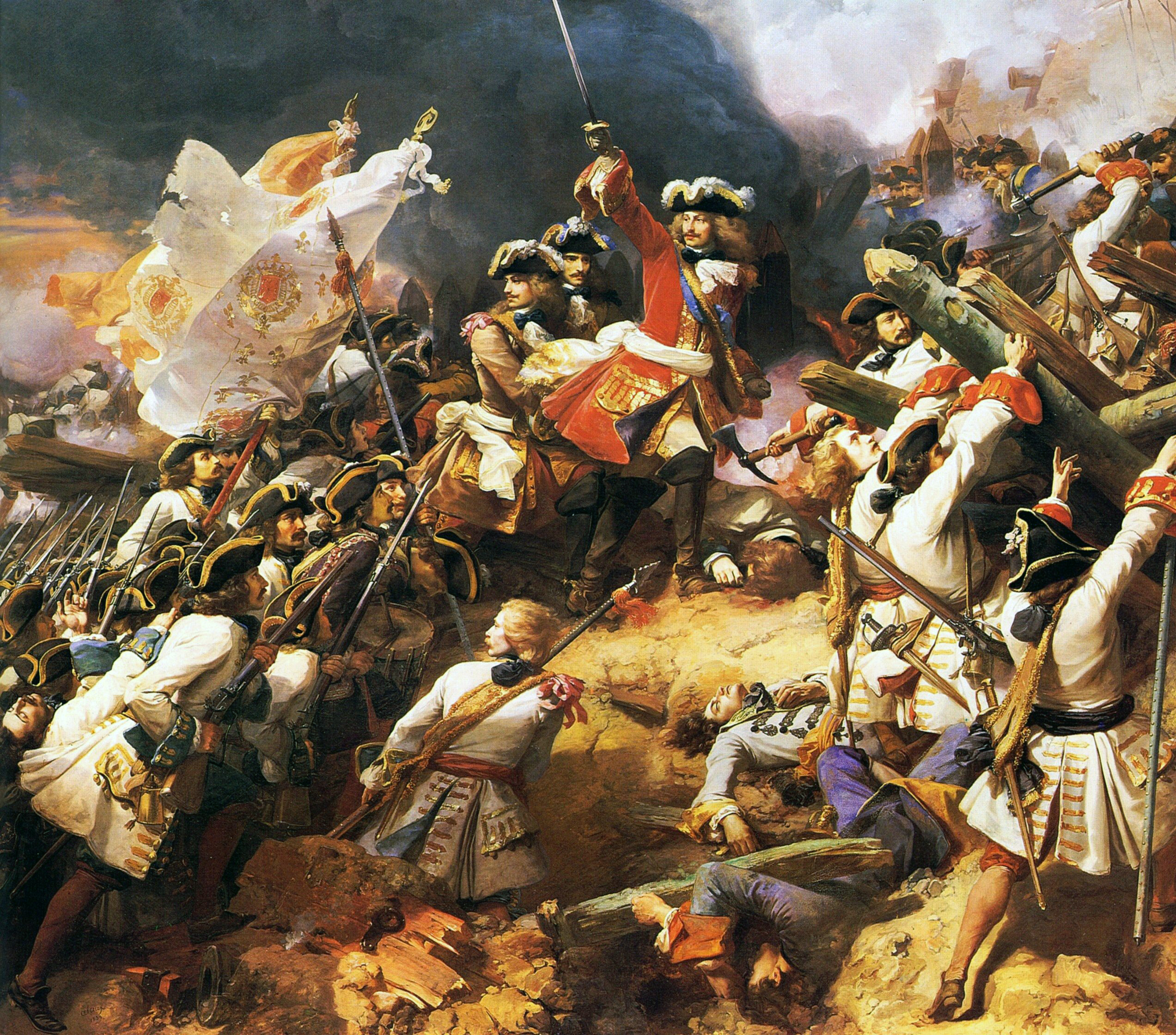
- Artist: Jean Alaux
- Year: 1839
- Medium: Oil on canvas
- Dimensions: 465 cm × 542 cm (183 in × 213 in)
- Location: Palace of Versailles, Versailles

The Battle of Denain (French: La Bataille de Denain) is an 1839 history painting by the French artist Jean Alaux. It depicts the Battle of Denain, fought on 24 July 1712, during the War of the Spanish Succession. After the British Army had withdrawn from the Grand Alliance against Louis XIV, the French were able to go on the offensive and win a victory over Prince Eugene of Savoy at Denain in Northern France. This ended a run of defeats they had suffered against the Allies. Their commander Marshal Villars is shown leading his men forward.

The large painting was commissioned by Louis Philippe I for the Galerie des Batailles of the new Musée de l'Histoire de France at the Palace of Versailles. During the July Monarchy a large number of battle scenes were produced commemorating military victories from French history. Alaux received 12,000 Francs for this picture, which was exhibited at the Salon of 1839 in Paris.

== Bibliography ==
- Gervereau, Laurent. La guerre sans dentelles. Skira-Flammarion, 2009.
