= The Conduct of the Allies =

1711 book by Jonathan Swift

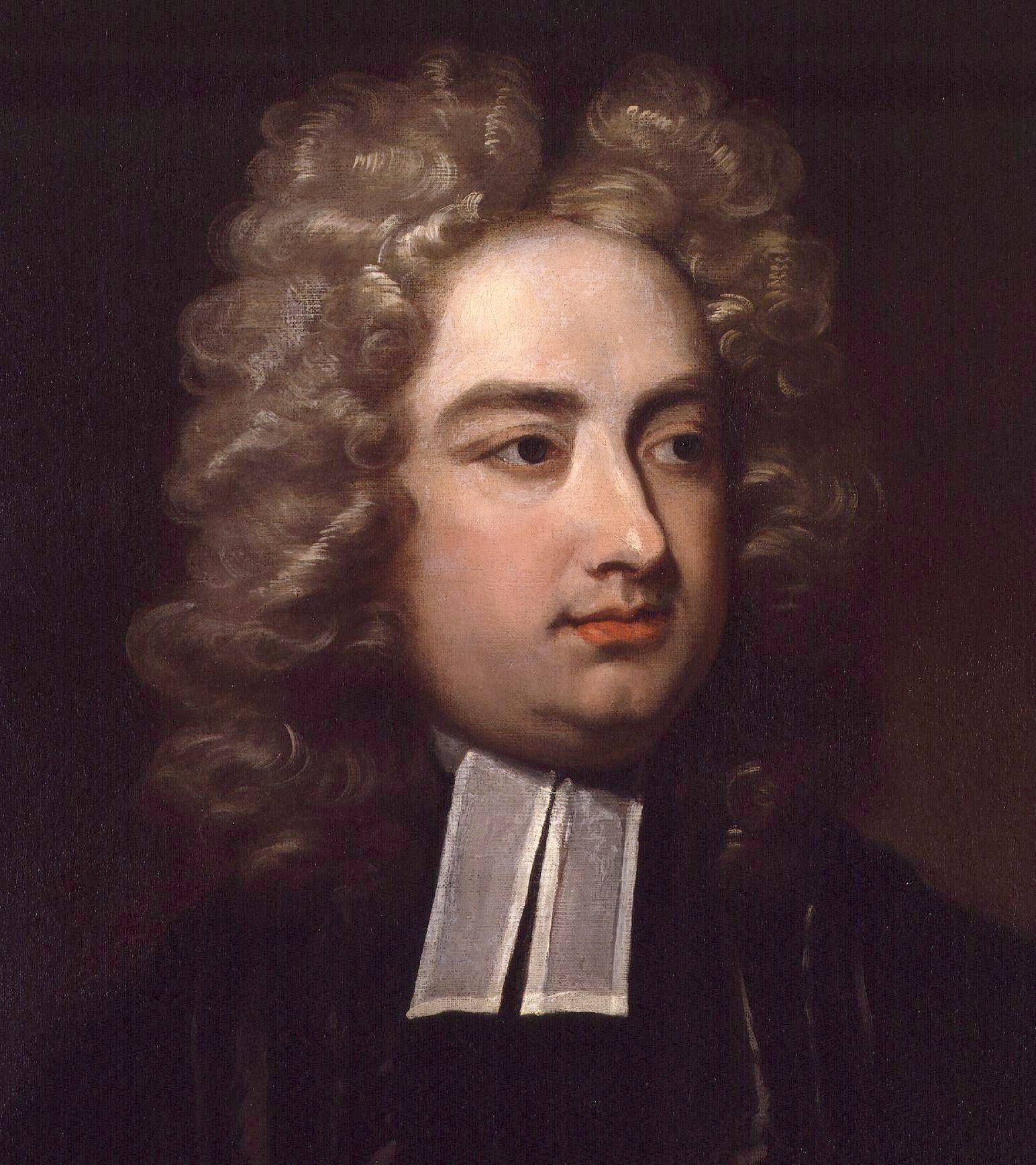
Jonathan Swift by Charles Jervas.

The Conduct of the Allies and Late Ministry in Beginning and Carrying on the Present War was a book in essay-style written by Jonathan Swift, in which he attacked Britain's allies in the War of the Spanish Succession. It was published on 27 November 1711.

== Background ==
Britain had been at war with France from 1689 to 1697 and continued in 1702 in a Grand Alliance that included the Dutch. During the summer of 1711, Queen Anne's Secretary of State for the Northern Department, Lord Bolingbroke, began secret peace negotiations with the French foreign minister, Torcy. The preliminaries of the peace were signed on 27 September. The Whig opposition attempted to rally support against the Treaty with their slogan "No Peace Without Spain".

Bolingbroke helped Swift with the book's composition.

== Overview ==
After the preface of four paragraphs, the book is divided into five sections. Firstly, 10 paragraphs give a theoretical and historical background. Secondly, ten paragraphs give the immediate causes of the war. Thirdly, 48 paragraphs contain the substance of Swift's argument, including the government's case for a unilateral peace with France. Fourthly, 10 paragraph attack the previous Whig government and justify the appointment of Tory's ministry in 1710. Fifthly, the Whig war aim of preventing the French king's grandson from inheriting the Spanish throne is discussed.

Swift attacked the Duke of Marlborough: "whether this War were prudently begun or not, it is plain, that the true Spring or Motive of it, was the aggrandising of a particular Family [the Churchills], and in short, a War of the General [Marlborough] and the Ministry [the Whigs,] and not of the Prince or People".

== Reception ==
The book was a tremendous popular success. By the end of January 1712 the book had sold 11,000 copies. Swift's anti-war and anti-Whig arguments captured parliamentary and popular opinion. The government subsequently signed the Peace of Utrecht.

== See also ==
- List of books with anti-war themes
