= Jean Alaux =

French painter (1786–1864)

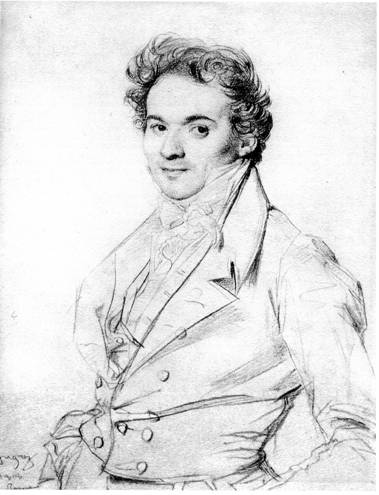
1818 portrait of Alaux by Ingres

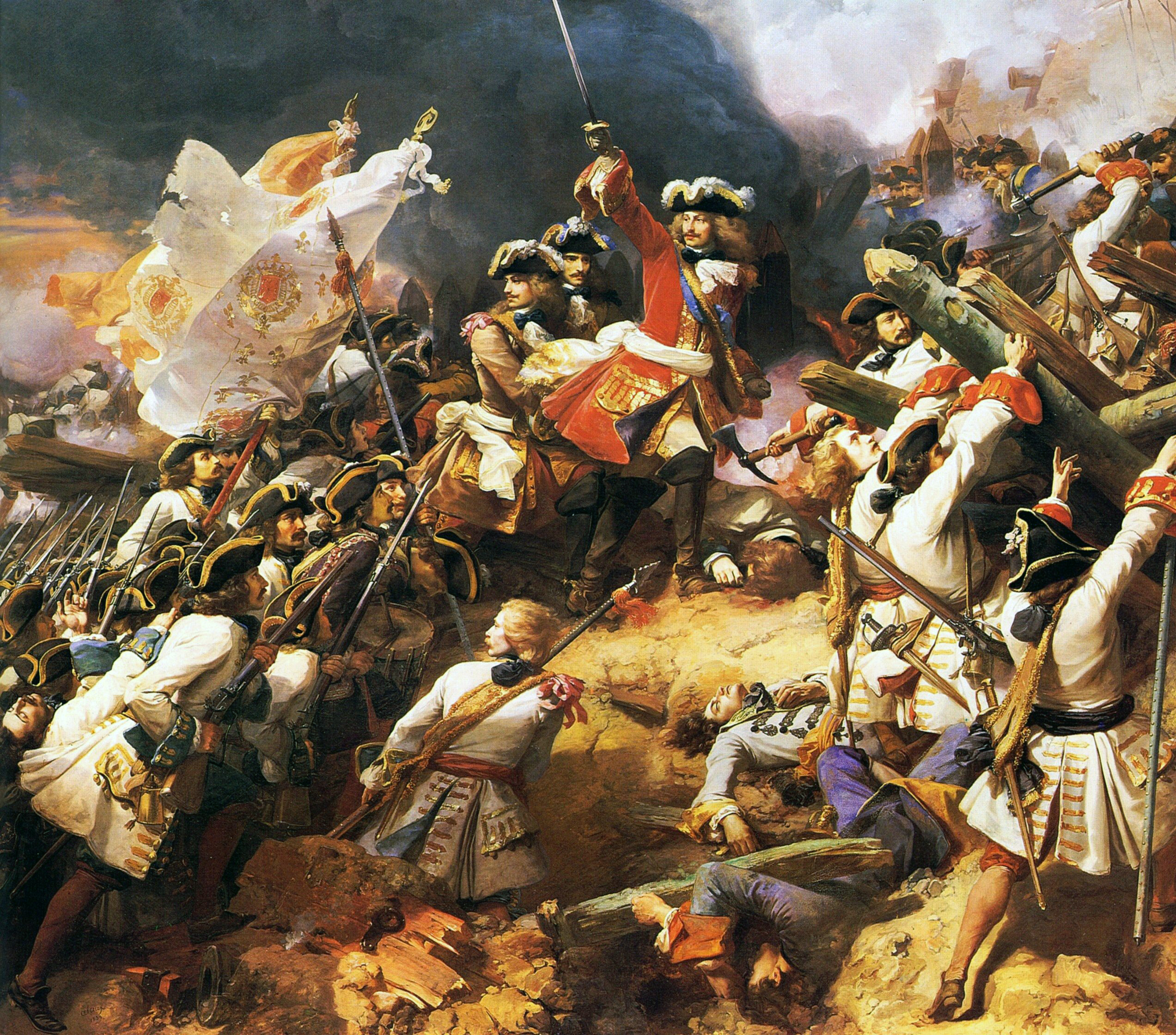
The Battle of Denain (1839)

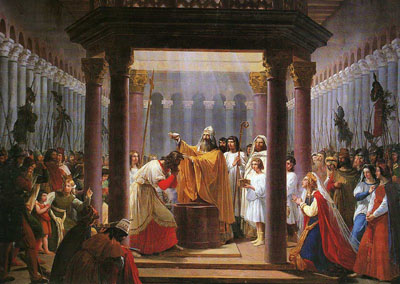
The Baptism of Clovis (1825)

Jean Alaux, called "le Romain" ("the Roman"), (1786 – 2 March 1864) was a French history painter and Director of the French Academy in Rome from 1846 to 1852.

== Biography ==
Alaux was born in Bordeaux, the son of a painter and the second of four brothers who all became painters. He received his first lessons in art from his father, but went on to a formal training with Pierre Lacour and later with Pierre-Narcisse Guérin. In 1807 he was admitted to the École des Beaux-Arts in Paris. From 1808 he entered works for the Prix de Rome, but his energies were diverted when his elder brother, Jean-Francois Alaux (1783–1858), asked him to help with a large "neorama" (a type of Panorama) he was working on. Alaux eventually won the major Prix de Rome in 1815 with a work entitled Briseis weeping over the body of Patroclus, a scene inspired by the Iliad of Homer. He subsequently became a pensionnaire at the French Academy in Rome from 1816 to 1820 and went on to become its director.

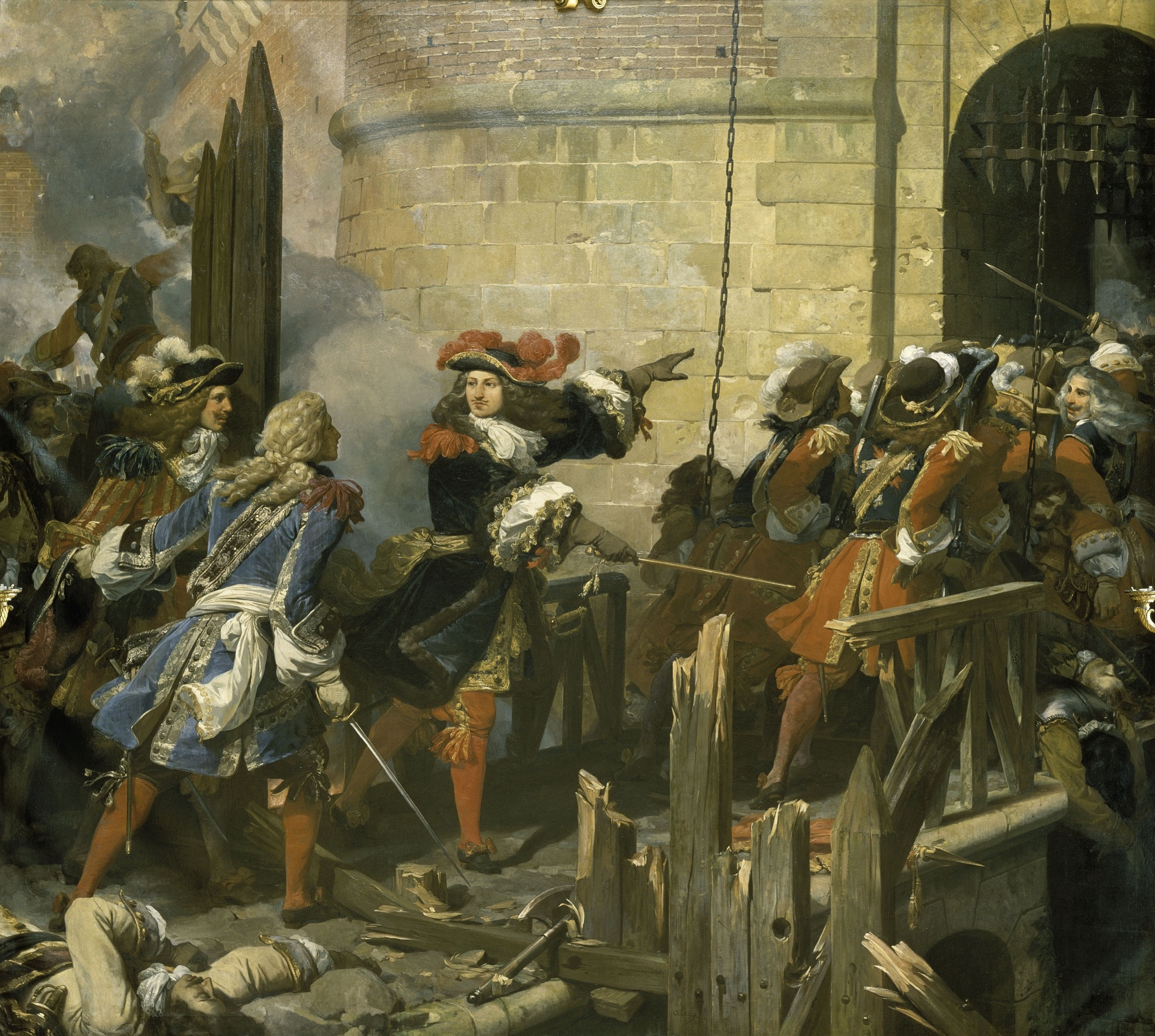
The Storming of Valenciennes (1837)

Among his fellow artists at the Academy were Drolling, Picot, and Cogniet, along with sculptors David d'Angers, Pradier, and Ramey; he became a friend of Ingres. His first painting at the Academy was Cadmus killing the dragon at the fountains of Dirce, which was later purchased by the Duke of Orleans but was destroyed in the fire which engulfed the Palais-Royal in the French Revolution of 1848. Alaux also painted at the Academy Diamedes carrying off the palladium and Episodes in the combats between the centaurs and the Lapithes. In 1821, he returned to France, where his reputation steadily grew with works such as The Baptism of Clovis (1825), States General of 1838, The Assembly of the notables at Rouen in 1596, and States General 1614. Under the July Monarchy, he worked at the "Galerie des batailles" of the Château de Versailles, for which he painted The Battle of Villaviciosa (1836); The Storming of Valenciennes (1837); and The Battle of Denain (1839).

Alaux was appointed as director of the French Academy in Rome in 1846 and was caught up in the siege of Rome of 1849, involving defending Italian forces under Garibaldi and the invading French army; he and his students were forced to temporarily flee the city for France. His directorship ended quietly with his retirement in 1852.

Alaux died in Paris on 2 March 1864.
