= Jacques-Louis Comte de Noyelles =

Walloon military officer in the service of the Dutch Republic

Jacques-Louis, Comte de Noyelles
- Died: 11 April 1708; Barcelona
- Military career
- Allegiance: Dutch Republic
- Branch: Infantry
- Service years: 1674–1708
- Rank: General
- Unit: Dutch States Army
- Conflicts: Franco-Dutch War; Nine Years' War; Glorious Revolution; Battle of Fleurus; Battle of Steenkerque; Battle of Landen; Siege of Namur; War of the Spanish Succession; Siege of Stevensweert; Capture of Liège; Siege of Huy; Battle of Blenheim; Battle of Elixheim; Siege of Zandvliet; Siege of Barcelona

Jacques-Louis, Comte de Noyelles (c. 1655 – Barcelona, 11 April 1708) was a Walloon military officer in the service of the Dutch Republic between 1672 and 1708. He was also named an Austrian Field Marshal. He served in the Franco-Dutch War, the Glorious Revolution, the Nine Years' War, and the War of the Spanish Succession in both the northern and the Iberian theatres of that war.

== Life ==
=== Personal life ===
Jacques-Louis was the son of the Walloon military officer in Spanish service Eugène-Eustace, Comte de Noyelles (Note: A county in Artois, which had until 1659 been part of the Spanish Netherlands.) et de Fallais (Note: A county within the Duchy of Brabant, which had been the fief of his mother, Marguerite de Bourgogne, comtesse de Fallais.) and Marie-Alexandrine, baronne de Ketteler et du Saint-Empire. He married Sophie-Charlotte d'Aumale de Hautcourt in 1679 in The Hague. They had six children: Marie (1681), Guillaume (1682), Eugène-Philippe (1685), Johanna-Amarantha (1686), Marie (2, 1687) and Guillaume (2, 1689). There was an earlier son, Frédéric-Charles-Louis (birthdate unknown), who was appointed as a captain in his father's regiment in 1699, which points to a possible earlier marriage. (Note: In the Commisionbooks of the Raad van State there are entries for both his commission as captain in 1699, and as "brigadier" of the Infantry on 15 February 1707.)

Jacques-Louis received the county of Fallais, his grandmother's fief, from his father in 1686, despite the fact that by that time it had been auctioned off for debts on the orders of the feudal court of the Duchy of Brabant in the Spanish Netherlands. He obtained on 13 February 1688 an order from the feudal court for Brabant in The Hague, (Note: This was a court instituted by the Dutch Republic after the Peace of Münster, in which it was awarded the northern part of the Duchy of Brabant, in competition with the feudal court of the southern part of the Duchy of Brabant, that was retained by Spain as part of the Spanish Netherlands.) contradicting the order of the Brabant court, which enabled him between 1688 and 1692 to exercise all feudal rights in Fallais. For that reason he was able to add "comte de Fallais" to his name. But at the urging of the governor-general in Brussels the States General of the Netherlands decided on 16 January 1692 to invalidate the order of the feudal court in The Hague, and give the county back to the person who had bought it at auction in 1686. Jacques-Louis so lost Fallais, but he kept using the extension "de Fallais" to his name.

=== Career ===
Noyelles started his military career as a cadet in the Blue Guard (Note: Life guard of stadtholder William III.) in the Dutch States Army in 1672. On 21 November 1674 he was promoted to captain in the Guard. On 7 January 1681 he was promoted to colonel of the Zeeland regiment of foot of Maregnault; this was henceforth known as "Fallais" after the name the colonel preferred. In 1688 he accompanied Wiliam III to England as part of the invasion force that brought about the Glorious Revolution.

At the beginning of the War of the Grand Alliance his regiment was first part of the army led by Prince Georg Friedrich of Waldeck in the Spring of 1689. As such he fought in the Battle of Walcourt. Later that year his regiment was placed at the disposal of the Army of Flanders under Francisco Antonio de Agurto, 1st Marquess of Gastañaga. He was made a "brigadier" (Note: This was an informal rank in the Dutch States Army up to 1701, when it was formalized.) on 24 December 1689. His regiment was part of the army led by Waldeck that fought in the Battle of Fleurus (1690). In 1691 he was made a major-general (Note: He was also made postmaster-general for the entire army.) and distinguished himself at the Battle of Steenkerque in 1692 and the Battle of Neerwinden in 1693. On 25 October 1694 he was promoted to lieutenant-general. In 1695 together with Charles Thomas, Prince of Vaudémont he commanded the allied troops diverting marshal François de Neufville, duc de Villeroy during the Siege of Namur (1695). He was instrumental in preventing a surprise attack by Villeroy on the Allied troops dujring the night of 13–14 July 1695. After the Peace of Ryswick in 1697 he was appointed governor of the fortress city Bergen op Zoom.

At the start of the War of Spanish Succession he captured Stevensweert, after having taken part in the Siege of Venlo (1702), and the next year Huy. In 1703–1704 he commanded the allied troops on the Meuse with headquarters Liège. In 1704 he was made a full general of infantry. (Note: At the same time as Nassau-Ouwerkerk was made a Field Marshal, and Slangenburg and John William Friso were also made full generals.) In that year he fought in the Battle of Blenheim at the head of a Hanoverian brigade of cavalry. (Note: He may have been wounded in the throat according to a letter by Sophia of Hanover to her sister Louise Hollandine of the Palatinate of 17 August 1704.) The next year he commanded the Dutch contingent in Marlborough's Moselle campaign.

On the eve of the Battle of Elixheim, 17 July 1705, Dutch troops, consisting of 22 battalions and 30 squadrons, under Noyelles attacked the castle of Wangen that protected a bridge across the Gete river and a part of the Lines of Brabant. In two columns, the Dutch marched forward. Both columns were preceded by a detachment of grenadiers. The attack on the castle itself was to be carried out by the left column, at a stone bridge over the Geete, close to the village of Nederhespen. Sixty experienced grenadiers were ordered to take control of the Geete crossing point. They then had to break through the French lines through a flank attack and wait for reinforcements. The cavalry of the right column had the task of routing the enemy dragoons at Orsmael. 16 June at 9 pm, the advance had begun. However, due to various complications, it would take until 4am the next day for the first troops to arrive at the river. Nevertheless, the attack went smoothly. Poor reconnaissance by the French meant that they had been unaware of the Dutch advance. The castle, occupied by 30 French soldiers, was quickly taken and the French lines also offered little resistance. Noyelles' right-wing column broke through the lines at Over- and Nederhespen without a fight. The next day the main Allied forced crossed this bridge and pierced the French lines. The French lost nine standards, three flags, 18 guns, and 2500 prisoners, among whom the French army commander Yves d'Alègre. Later that year Noyelles directed the Siege of Zandvliet.

In 1706 he was sent to Catalonia to command the Dutch troops in Spain during the War of Spanish Succession as the replacement of general Fagel. Emperor Charles VI, the pretender to the Spanish throne under the name king Charles III of Spain, was very enamored of him and made him a Feldmarschall-Lieutenant in the Austrian army. He effected the lifting of the Siege of Barcelona by the French and Spanish troops of king Philip V of Spain in 1706. Together with lord Peterborough he led the Anglo-Dutch army in Catalonia during 1706–1707. (Note: He opposed the policies of the allied commander, the Huguenot Frenchman in English service Henri de Massue, Earl of Galway, whose nemesis he became, to the frustration of the (by then) British First Lord of the Treasury Sidney Godolphin, 1st Earl of Godolphin, who saw him as an evil influence on king Charles III.) After the disappointing events of 1707, especially the devastating losses during the Battle of Almansa, where Noyelles was not present, he asked for his recall. However, that didn't arrive in time. Noyelles died of a throat disease in Barcelona on 11 April 1708. Noyelles' death was seen as a significant setback for the Allies by Charles, as he had planned to place the entire Spanish militia under his command and entrust him with its reorganization.

== Sources ==
- Enschedé, A.J. (1896). "Jacques-Louis, Comte de Noyelles et de Fallais. Général au service des Provinces-Unies". Bulletin de la Commission pour l'histoire des églises Wallonnes (in French). Martinus Nijhoff. pp. 79–88.
- Frey, L.; Frey, M.L. (1995). "Noyelles et Falais, Jacques-Louis, comte de". The Treaties of the War of the Spanish Succession: An Historical and Critical Dictionary. Greenwood Publishing Group. p. 312.
- Institut archéologique liégeois (1886). "Eugéne-Ignace de Noyelles 1657-1687". Bulletin de l'Institut archéologique liégeoise, Volumes 19-20 (in French). Liège: Maison Curtius. pp. 354–365.
- Stapleton, John (2003). "Forging a coalition army: William III, the Grand Alliance, and the confederate army in the Spanish Netherlands, 1688-1697 (dissertation)". Ohio State U. Archived from the original on 13 March 2022.
- Wijn, J.W. (1956). Het Staatsche Leger: Deel VIII-1 Het tijdperk van de Spaanse Successieoorlog 1702–1705 (The Dutch States Army: Part VIII-1 The era of the War of the Spanish Succession 1702–1705) (in Dutch). Martinus Nijhoff.
- Wijn, J.W. (1959). Het Staatsche Leger: Deel VIII-2 Het tijdperk van de Spaanse Successieoorlog (The Dutch States Army: Part VIII-2 The era of the War of the Spanish Succession) (in Dutch). Martinus Nijhoff.
