= Battle of Landen =

1693 battle of the Nine Years' War

- Part of the Nine Years' War
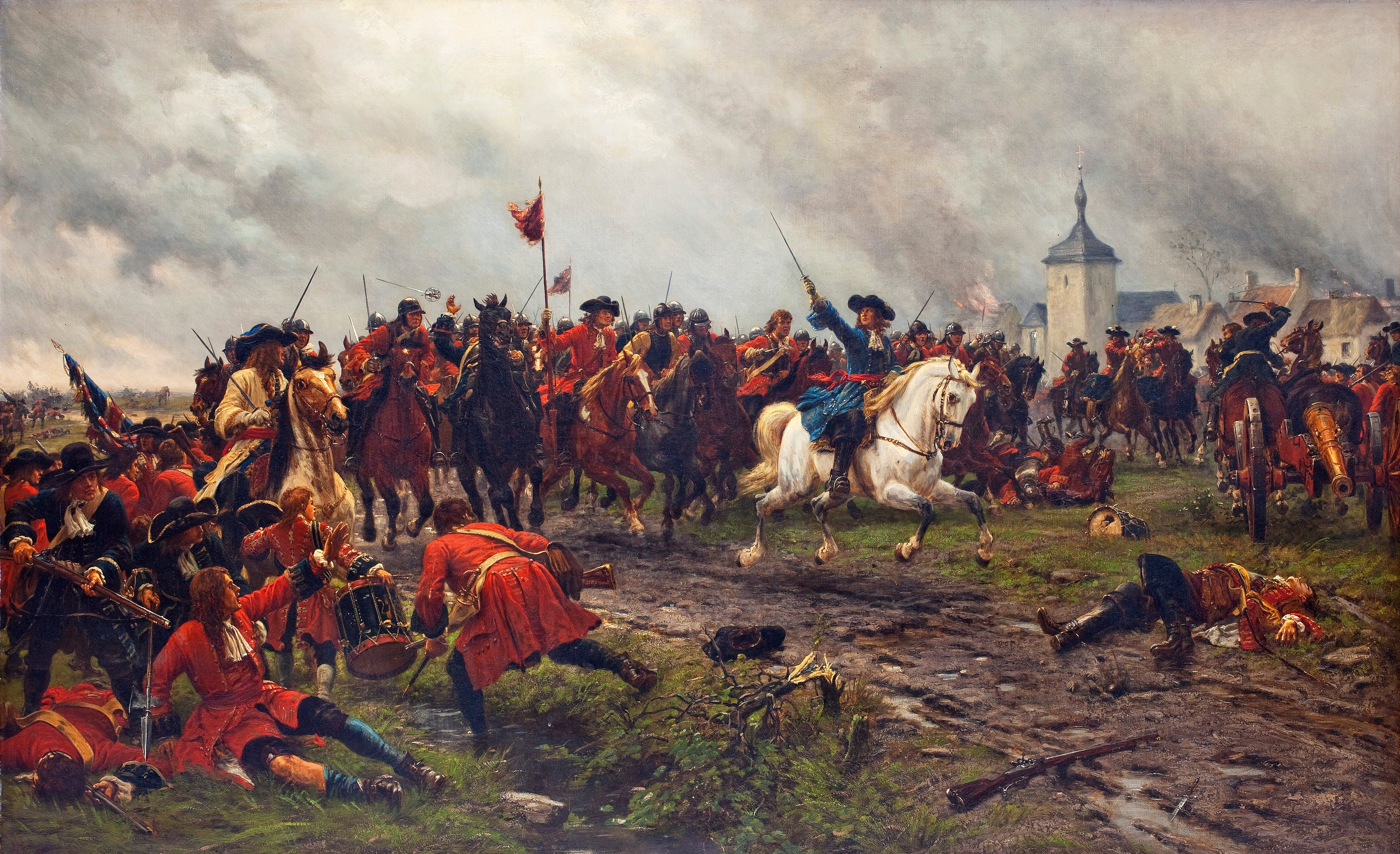
- William III leading a cavalry charge at the battle
Date	29 July 1693
Location	Neerwinden, present-day Belgium 50°46′21″N 05°02′06″E
Result	French victory

Belligerents
France	Dutch Republic; England; Holy Roman Empire; Spain; Scotland

Commanders and leaders
(Kingdom of France) Luxembourg (Kingdom of France) Berwick (POW) (Kingdom of France) Villeroy (Kingdom of France) Conti	(Dutch Republic) (Kingdom of England) (Kingdom of Scotland) William III (Dutch Republic) Henry Casimir II (Dutch Republic) Nassau-Usingen (Holy Roman Empire) (Spanish Empire) Maximilian

Strength
70,000 (Note: Estimates for the number of French troops vary from 66,000 men to 80,000 men. In any case it is assumed that the French significantly outnumbered the Allies.); 70 guns	50,000 (Note: Estimates of the amount of Allied troops range from 40,000 to 60,000, but are most often placed at around 50,000.); 80–100 guns

Casualties and losses
8,000 to 15,000 killed or wounded (Note: Different estimates: • 8,000–10,000; • 15,000)	9,500 to 20,000 killed, wounded or captured, plus 60–84 guns (Note: Different estimates: • 9,500 plus 80 guns; • 12,000 to 14,000 plus 60 guns; • 16,500 plus 84 guns; • 18,000 to 20,000 plus 80 guns)

The Battle of Landen, also known as Battle of Neerwinden took place on 29 July 1693, during the Nine Years' War near Landen, then in the Spanish Netherlands, now part of Belgium. A French army under Marshal Luxembourg defeated an Allied force led by William III.

By 1693, all combatants were struggling with the financial and material costs of the conflict. Hoping to end the war with a favourable negotiated peace, Louis XIV of France decided first to improve his position by taking the offensive. Having achieved local superiority in numbers, Luxembourg attacked the main Allied army, which was holding positions around Landen.

Most of the fighting took place on the Allied right, which the French assaulted three times before finally breaking through. Although forced to abandon their guns, most of the Allied army retreated in good order as the French were too exhausted to initiate a pursuit.

Although the French forced the Allies from the field, as with the Battle of Steenkerque the previous year, both sides suffered heavy casualties and Louis failed to achieve the decisive result that would force the Allies to negotiate peace. William quickly replaced his losses and in 1694 achieved numerical superiority in Flanders for the first time in the war.

== Background ==
Since the outbreak of the Nine Years' War in 1689, the French generally held the advantage in the Spanish Netherlands, but failed to achieve a decisive victory or divide the Grand Alliance. By 1693, the strategic situation seemed to be moving in favour of the Allies. However, all sides were now struggling with the cost of the war and catastrophic famine caused by the Little Ice Age. These factors made military operations more problematic, especially due to an increase in the average size of armies from 25,000 in 1648 to over 100,000 by 1697, levels unsustainable for pre-industrial economies.

1693 Flanders campaign; key locations using modern borders

Fighting a multi-front war on his own, Louis XIV of France was keen to reach a negotiated peace, but sought to improve his position before doing so. When the 1693 campaigning season began, Louis took the offensive in the Rhineland, Flanders and Catalonia. When the attack in Germany proved unexpectedly successful, in early June Luxembourg was ordered to reinforce it with 28,000 of his own troops and prevent the Allies doing the same. He was also ordered to capture Liège, the capital of the Prince-Bishopric of Liège.

Luxembourg increased his field force to 116,000 by stripping garrisons from towns throughout Maritime Flanders, including Dunkirk and Ypres. On 9 June, he embarked on a series of marches, simultaneously threatening Liège, Huy and Charleroi. Maximilian of Bavaria, Governor of the Spanish Netherlands, insisted on covering all three, forcing the Allies to divide their forces. However, despite his numerical superiority, Luxembourg was not strong enough to besiege Liège and keep the main Allied force at bay. To further stretch French resources, William sent 15,000 men under Ferdinand Willem of Wurttemberg into Artois, and on 18 July, the latter broke through the lines of the Scheldt near Dottignies.

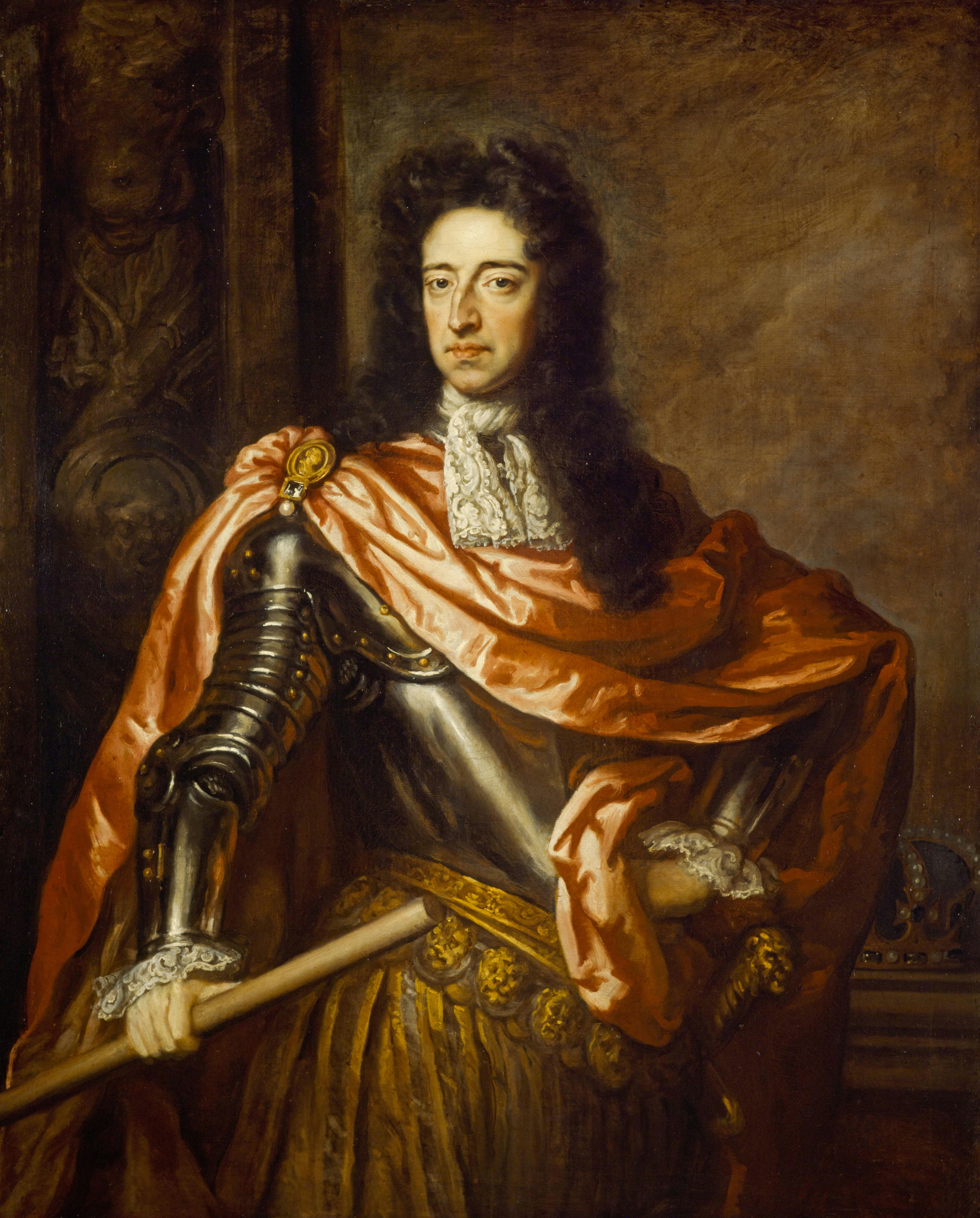
William of Orange, by Godfrey Kneller.

In response, Luxembourg ordered Villeroy to take Huy, which surrendered on 23 July. William increased the Liège garrison to 17,000, while his remaining troops established a line running in a rough semicircle from Eliksem on the right, to Neerwinden on the left. This position provided flexibility of response, but their ability to manoeuvre was restricted by the Little Geete River, three kilometres to the rear.

Seeing an opportunity, Luxembourg reversed his route, and after a forced march of 30 kilometres, arrived at Landen in the early evening of 28 July. Since the Allied army was outnumbered by 70,000 to 50,000, he assumed William would link up with Würtemberg before risking battle. Although notified of the French approach by mid-afternoon, William decided to hold his ground despite being advised to slip across the river at night. Factors behind this decision included lack of cavalry to cover an orderly retreat, while the small battlefield would prevent Luxembourg making full use of his superior numbers.

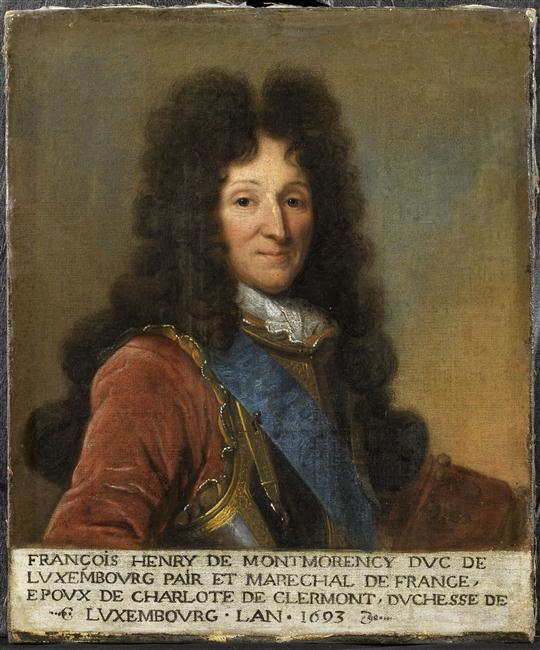
Luxembourg, by Hyacinthe Rigaud.

The Allies hastily constructed earthworks running between Laar and Neerwinden, containing 80 of their 91 pieces of heavy artillery. While less effective against infantry attack or artillery bombardment, these provided protection from the superior French cavalry. In the centre, the open ground between Neerwinden and Neerlanden was solidly entrenched, with the village of Rumsdorp on the centre-left as an advance post. The left rested on Landen brook and was the hardest to attack.

Maximilian commanded the Allied right, with the centre led by William himself, and Henry Casimir II the left. These were drawn up in conventional formation, with the infantry in front and cavalry to the rear. Luxembourg concentrated his main assault force of 28,000 men against the Allied right, while his centre and right under Villeroy and Prince de Conti respectively conducted simultaneous attacks to prevent William reinforcing his right. A strong force of infantry and dragoons was designated to attack Rumsdorp. In this formation his tightly packed French lines in the centre were, however, optimal targets for Allied artillery.

== Battle ==
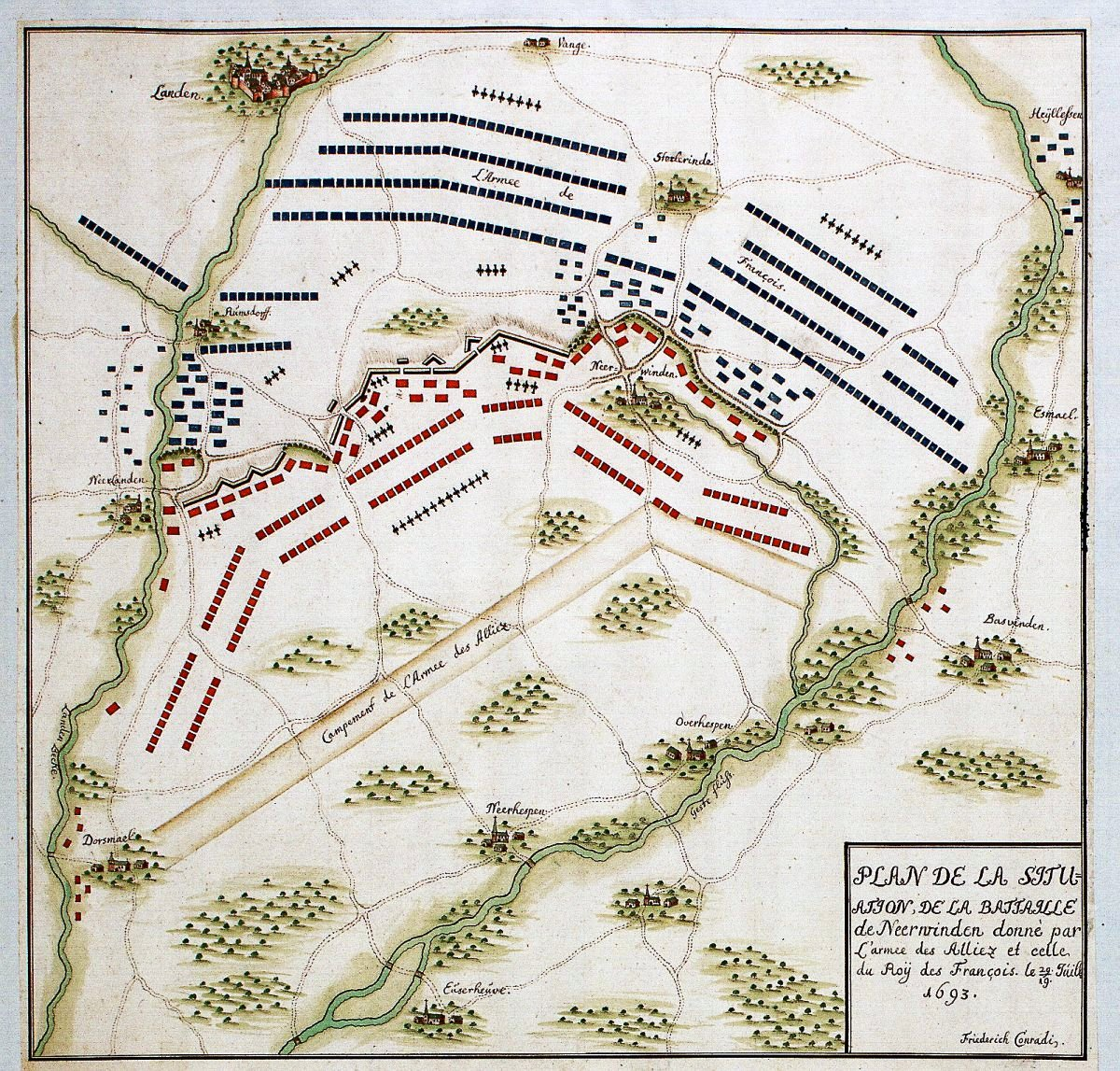
Map of the battle. The Allied armies are in red.

=== Artillery duel and the first French assault ===
The artillery duel probably started between 6:00 and 7:00. The army of the Dutch Republic always possessed very large amounts of artillery and the Allied artillery regiments were better equipped than those of the French. The duel thus went largely in favour of the Allies and they inflicted terrible destruction on the French. With about 150 artillery pieces in total, it was very intense. In a letter to the Prince of Condé the Prince de Conti wrote:

... the most valiant officers of our army had never seen such a cannonade, so long and so close, and more like the fighting at sea than on land.

Count Solms, general of the Allied infantry, was mortally wounded in this phase of the battle. Somewhere between 8 and 9 a.m. the French began their attack on Laar and Neerwinden. Three assault columns, consisting of 28 battalions, launched a furious attack; Berwick in the middle stormed Neerwinden, while to his left the Lieutenant-General Rubantel and to his right the Lieutenant-General De Montchevreuil, supported his attack. Laar was soon captured, but things went less well for the French in Neerwinden. Here the French had to take every part of the village separately and the defenders fought with great bravery. Berwick managed to gain ground only slowly. While this was going on, French cavalry, after conquering Laar, pushed across the Laar Brook and attacked the Spanish cavalry, which it overran. But the French were in turn thrown back across the stream with great losses. This attack, however, caused the gunners of English battery on the heights behind Laar to evacuate their position without receiving orders to do so.

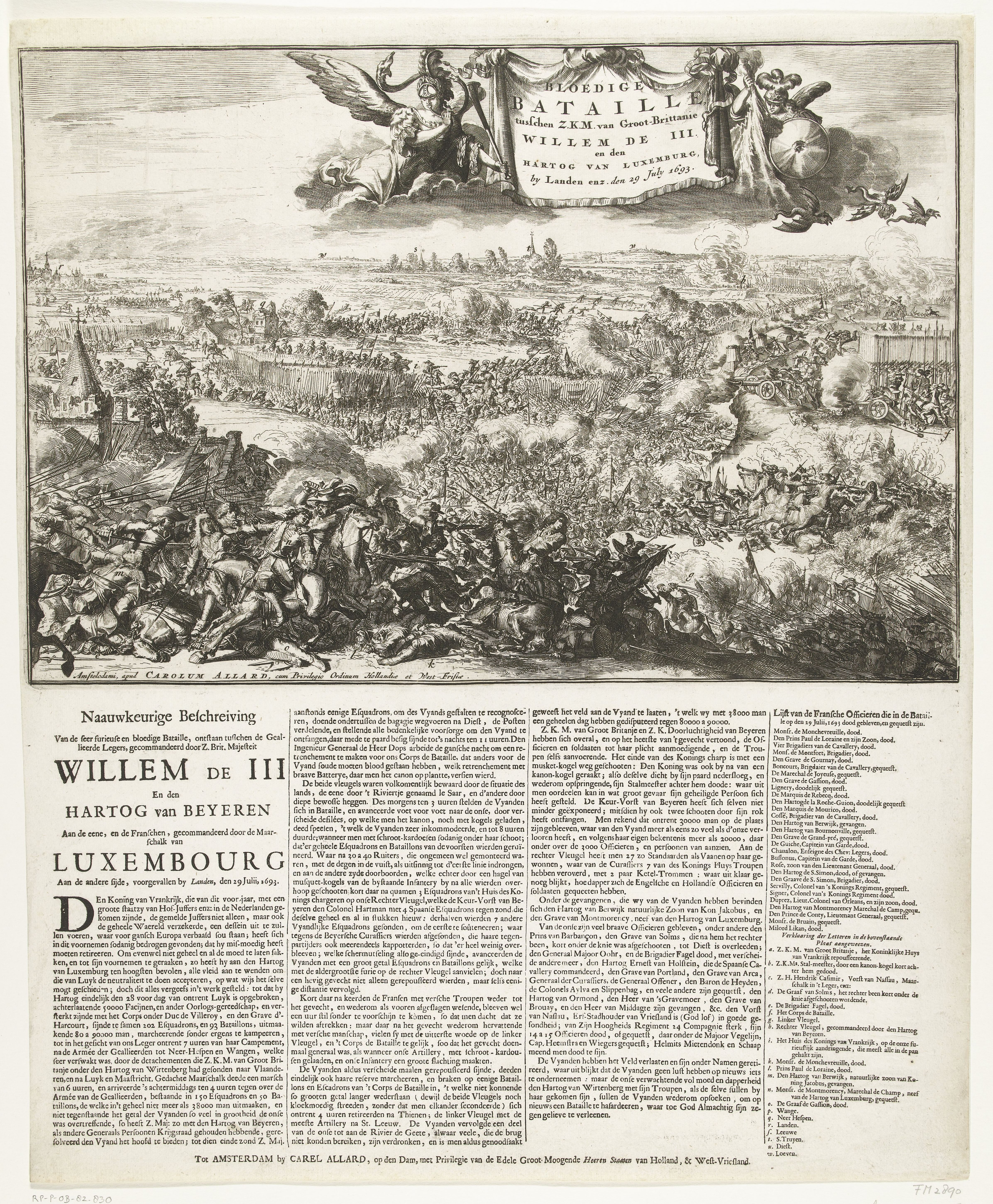
Dutch depiction and description of the battle by Romeyn de Hooghe and Carel Allard.

Berwick penetrated through to the edge of Neerwinden, but Rubantel and Montchevreuil, were unable to keep advancing on beside him, and, in the face of the great fire directed by the defender at their flanks, deviated more and more towards the centre of the village and finally retreated behind Berwick. This would become fatal to them. A counterattack by the Elector of Bavaria on the flanks of Rubantel and Montchevreuil forced them both out of the village and then Berwick's corps, after which Laar was also recaptured. This important counterattack, carried out with the help of English battalions from the centre sent by William III, restored the original allied lines. The French had suffered very heavy losses, Montchevreuil had been killed and Berwick captured.

Shortly after the commencement of the attack on Neerwinden and Laar, the French center made an attempt to breach the fortified line of the Allies. However, this effort was quickly abandoned. The foremost line of the French cavalry, comprising the elite Maison du Roi, advanced as if to storm it, but encountered a formidable gunfire, prompting a hasty retreat.

A little later, the French also attacked Rumsdorp and Neerlanden. Rumsdorp was taken by them, but their attack on the entrenched line behind it was repulsed. East of the Landen Brook, dismounted dragoons stormed Neerlanden, penetrated it twice, but were thrown back each time. Here the fight took on a ferocity that was not at all in Luxemburg's intention. The Dutch artillerymen had switched to canister shot and were killing hundreds of French troops. The streets became clogged with piles of corpses and wounded soldiers. Both William and Luxembourg rushed to this wing. William with reinforcments, while Luxembourg expressed his displeasure and ordered that they should fall back and stick to holding the outer fence of Rumsdorp. Luxembourg then returned to his left wing, where the battered troops of the assault on Neerwinden were gathered. He reorganised and reinforced this wing with 7,000 men from his general reserve and ordered a second attack on Laar and Neerwinden, this time led by the Prince de Conti.

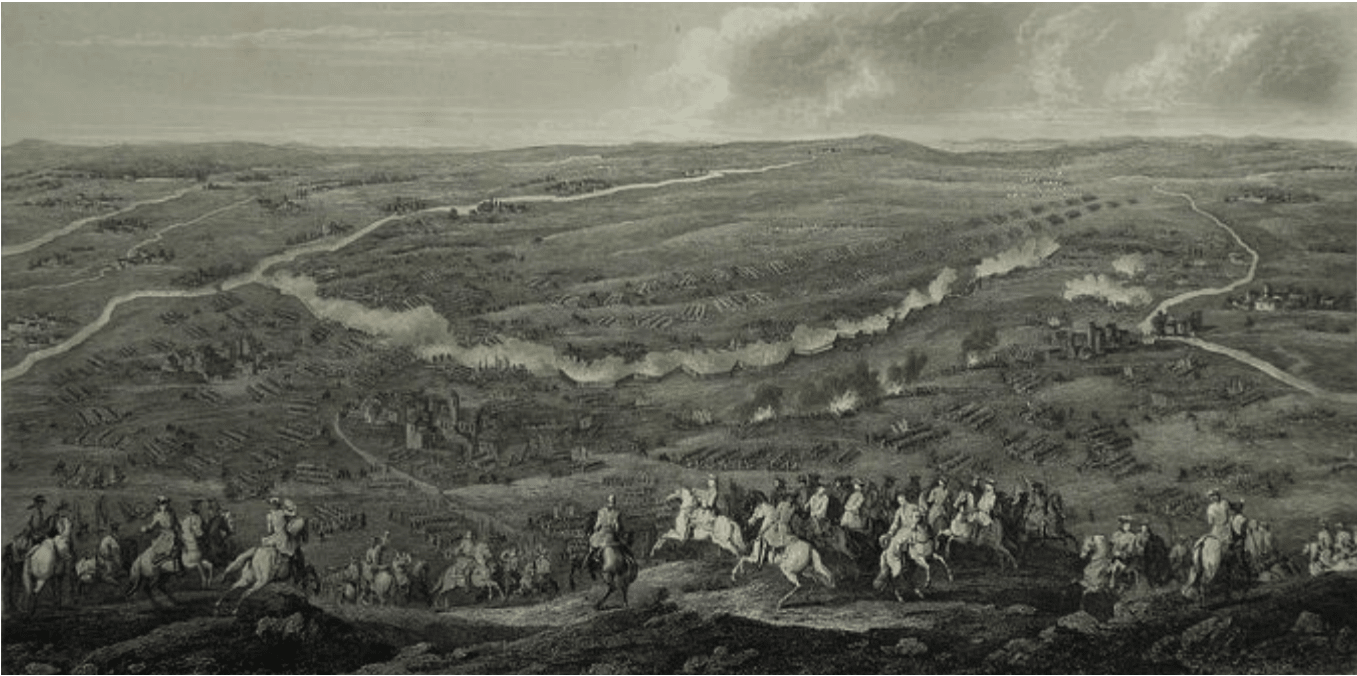
Painting of the battle, depicted from the French side.

=== Second French assault ===
This second attack took much the same course as the first. Again, Laar was taken first; in Neerwinden the defender fought behind hedges and walls and from the houses with great courage and perseverance, without however being able to prevent de Conti from slowly penetrating to the northern edge of the village. Here, however, the defenders (under which the English First Foot Guards, the Scots Guards and a battalion of Dutch Blue Guards) again held their ground through great effort. Again William III rushed in with English battalions to the action, and counterattacked. With the exception of the south-western edge, Neerwinden was recaptured after a long and bloody battle and then Laar too. The stubbornness with which 44 French and probably 33 German and English battalions, 30,000 to 40,000 men in all, fought here in a confined space and a short distance caused very heavy losses on both sides.

Midday was approaching and Luxembourg was still far from accomplishing his intended goal. His subordinates advised him, in view of the sinking courage of his troops and the great losses his infantry had suffered, to break off the fight. But Luxembourg decided otherwise. He still had 20 battalions of infantry in reserve, including seven battalions of the Maison du Roi, the elite of the French army, and his cavalry of 30,000 men was still almost intact.

=== Third French assault and breakthrough ===
Luxembourg took 7,000 infantry from his centre and left wing for a third attack on the allied right. He ordered an attack with the entire infantry at once, while personally leading the attack on Laar and Neerwinden. William again moved additional English units to meet this threat, but this could not prevent the villages from finally both falling into French hands after very heavy fighting. They were helped in this by the depletion of the defenders' ammunition. The cavalry of the Maison du Roi immediately charged the discouraged Hanoverian cavalry, but were checked by several battalions of Dutch infantry whom William had brought up from the Allied centre. The Dutch were in turn forced to retreat by an attack of the French and Swiss Guards. This gave the other French troops in the vicinity of Neerwinden the opportunity to break through the entrenchments of the Allies.

At the same time as the assault on Neerwinden and Laar de Feuquières ordered French infantry from Rumsdorp to secure a passage through the Allied centre, which had been largely deserted. He then brought up his cavalry to form up on the other side of the Allied entrenchments. Around this moment the Dutch artillerymen ceased their fire and retreated, probably to avoid falling into the hands of the advancing enemy. (Note: This retreat proved to be a contentious move as William blamed it in a large part for the defeat. Charles le Goulon, the Allied artillery commander, maintained that he had acted on the orders of General Obdam, while Obdam denied issuing such instructions. The intensity of Goulon's defense caused him to use language which offended William and did not endear him to the monarch. Ultimately, despite Goulon's claims of following orders, he was found in the wrong and was removed from the command of the artillery. Goulon was replaced by Otto Christoffel van Verschuer, a commander who would distinguish himself at the Battle of Ekeren a decade later.)

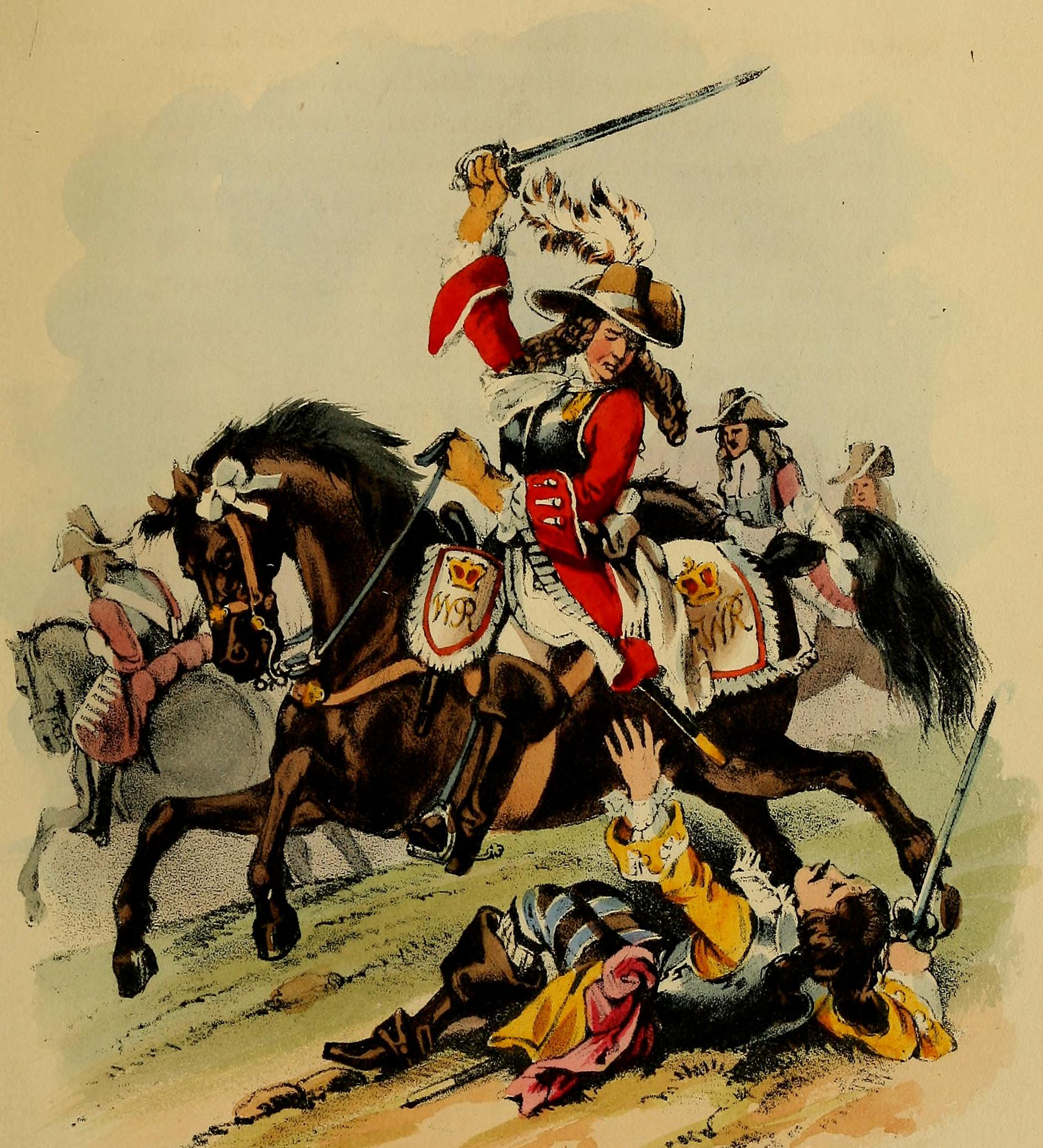
19th century depiction of an English horseman at the battle.

This French breakthrough happened around 15:00 and an hour later William ordered the Allies to retreat over the Geete. Doing so they abandoned most of their artillery which was entrenched and could not be withdrawn in time. There were by now 125 squadrons behind the allied lines and the battle had dissolved into a hand-to-hand combat of 30,000 to 40,000 horsemen clashing in a space of less than three square kilometres. This quickly took on the characteristics of a rearguard action. Maximilian of Bavaria and his German and Spanish cavalry were swiftly overwhelmed and forced to retreat across the Gete. The charges of the Dutch and English cavalry, under the personal leadership of William, were more successful. William led a number of cavalry charges himself, was nearly captured, but succeeded in slowing the French down and gained time for his pursued troops to scramble across the river. Although the retreat on the right was carried out in disarray, both William and Maximilian managed to get to safety.

The Dano-Dutch left wing under Hendrik Casimir fared better in their retreat, despite the strong resistance they faced. During their retreat his troops faced not only the enemy infantry in Rumsdorp and Attenhoven, but also the majority of the 125 French squadrons under Feuquières, which surrounded them from all sides. They however managed to fight their way through the French over a distance of about 7 kilometres and crossed the Geete in good order. (Note: Hendrik Casimir wrote later: 'As soon as the King [...] had directed me to think of retreating to save the left wing, towards which the enemy cavalry was already advancing to cut it off, I withdrew it from the posts, which I had up to that point held, and with all the order that could be observed in this end, let it descend towards the river of Gete. They [the left flank] passed it almost entirely, despite the continuous fire of the French squadrons, for only those who were too hasty drowned.' 'All the officers and the soldiers, mainly the infantry, behaved in such a way as could be expected of men of honour') Another Nine battalions of Dutch and Danish infantry under brigadier François Nicolas Fagel who were cut off close to Rumsdorp fought a stubborn rearguard action, but also crossed the river in good order. A few hundred allied horsemen had drowned trying to cross the Geete, but, supported by several British units holding positions around the bridge most of the army had reached the other side of the river by 17:00 and continued their retreat, undisturbed by the French cavalry. (Note: The Earl of Athlone, lamented that his cavalry, who fought the least, suffered most of its losses to a small river.)

== Aftermath ==
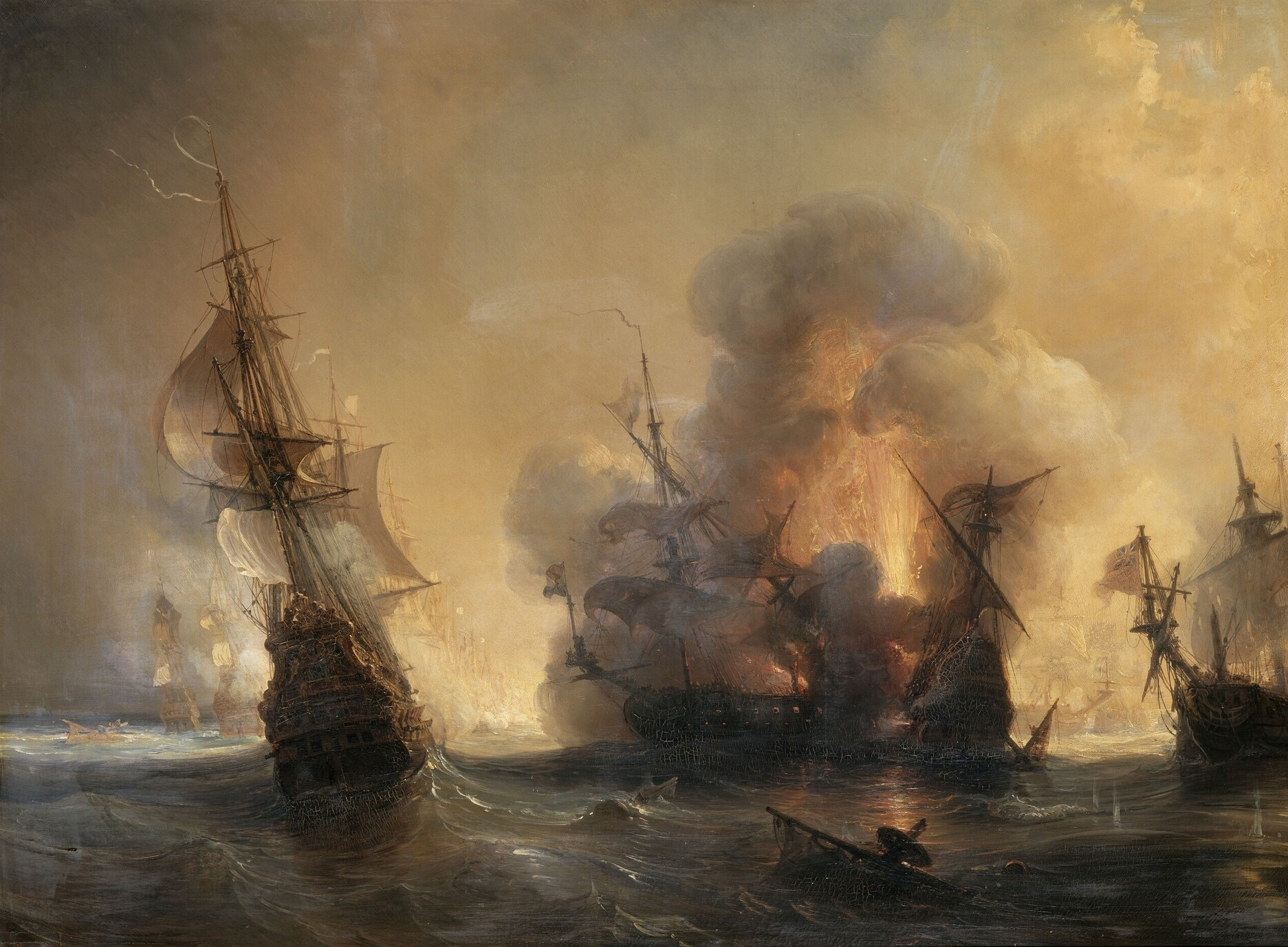
Both sides viewed the French naval victory at Lagos on 27 June as more significant

Whereas usually French generals announced their victories with much detail and praise, this time Luxembourg sent only a summary message to the king. (Note: Phillippe de Courcillon, Marquis of Dangeau noted on 1 August: M. de Luxembourg writes the king no more than four lines on a scrap of paper. This is roughly his letter: [...] 'Your enemies have done wonders, but your troops have done even better than them. [...] I myself, Sire, have no other merit than to have carried out the orders you gave me to take Huy and engage in battle with the Prince of Orange.') Landen might have been a crushing victory if the simultaneous attacks he ordered on the Allied left and centre had gone as planned. As it was, both sides suffered heavy casualties. However, estimated casualties varied widely. The French themselves claimed to have lost between 7,000 and 8,000 men, which was strongly disputed by the Allies. (Note: See also the work of Edward D'Auvergne.) (Note: The Earl of Orkney wrote in 1709 after the bloody Battle of Malplaquet, were the Allies suffered many casualties, that: 'I do not believe they have lost so many as wee. [but] I doubt it is with us as it was with the French at the battle of Landen.') French officer De la Colonie also came to a different conclusion and wrote that they had lost 18,000 to 20,000 men:

Their loss was reckoned to be at least fourteen or fifteen thousand men and twenty-eight pieces of cannon. Our own loss was so considerable that it was never exactly shown in the returns. The glory of victory was ours, but we paid dearly for it. We lost eighteen to twenty thousand men, including a great number of officers of distinction [...] The enemy called this action the Battle of the Fascines, on account of those that our men carried and the immense number of our killed, who, as they declared, were used as fascines to fill in the ditches.

Estimates of Allied losses range from 8,000 to 18,000 killed and wounded, with another 1,500 or 2,000 captured. A visitor to the area in 1707 noted the fields were still scattered with the bones of the dead.

William had a silver medal struck to celebrate his success in 'saving Liege' and escaping with the bulk of his troops. This was partly propaganda to counter the Battle of Lagos on 27 June, when the French intercepted a large Anglo-Dutch convoy and inflicted serious commercial damage, but there was also truth to the claim. Luxembourg's infantry was so battered that he indeed had to refrain from besieging Liège, while the return of Württemberg's corps meant that the Allies were able to replace their losses within days. A mutiny even broke out in the French army in which entire regiments rioted and demanded payment of back pay in threatening fashion. Louis XIV sent money and ordered Luxembourg to return to the French border to reassure the troops that they did not have to fight another battle. For these reasons it has been suggested by some writers that the battle was actually a strategic victory for William.

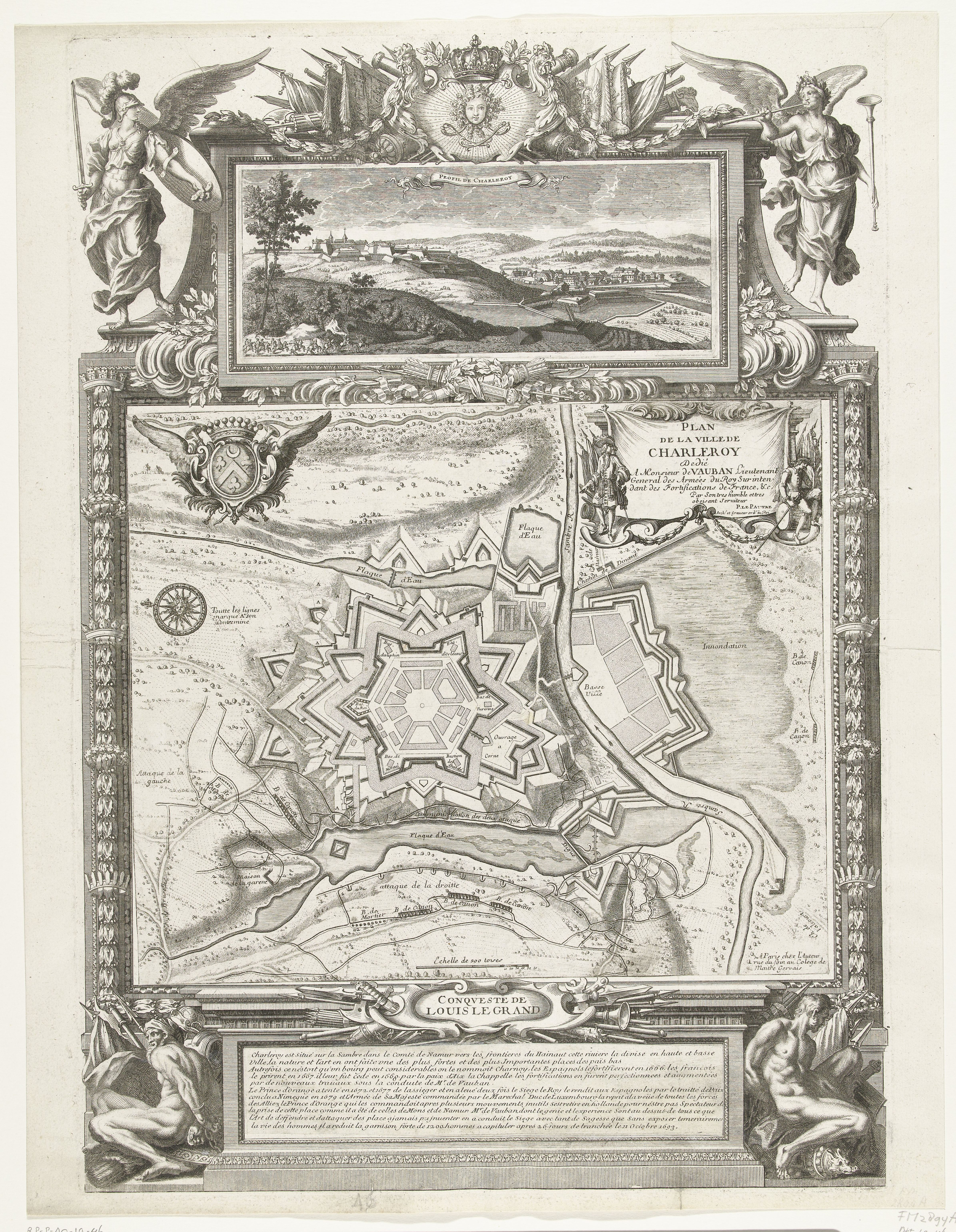
French contemporary illustration of the conquest of Charleroi.

The fact that William was able to save Liège and Maastricht from an attack, and the success of the Duke of Württemberg's raid in French Flanders meant that the 1693 campaign could be seen as overall Allied success. Still, the loss of Namur in 1692 followed by the defeat at Landen was evidence to William and Anthonie Heinsius, the Dutch Grand Pensionary, that the numerical inferiority of the Allies made it difficult to effectively protect the Spanish Netherlands. As a result, the Anglo-Dutch armies grew significantly in the following years, allowing William and the Allied army to assume the offensive and gain the initiative. Huy was recaptured in 1694 and Namur the next year.

Although Luxembourg has been criticised for failing to exploit his victory, his troops were exhausted, while the poor harvests of previous years meant a lack of forage for the horses and baggage train needed to pursue his opponents. The problem was so acute that capturing the Allied artillery proved a mixed blessing, as the French scarcely had sufficient to move their own. To still make something of the campaign Louis ordered Luxembourg to besiege the strategically unimportant but strong town of Charleroi. Its 4,000 strong Spanish garrison resisted for a month, but surrendered on the 13th of October, having lost more than half of its strength. Landen would be Luxembourg's last battle as he died in January 1695, depriving Louis of his best general.

== Legacy ==
The Irish Brigade fought on the French side and suffered severe losses; including the Irish Jacobite hero Patrick Sarsfield, who was mortally wounded during an attack on the village of Neerwinden.

Laurence Sterne's famous 1759 picaresque novel Tristram Shandy contains various references to the Nine Years' War, mostly the 1695 Second Siege of Namur. However, Corporal Trim refers to the Battle of Landen as follows:

Your honour remembers with concern, said the corporal, the total rout and confusion of our camp and army at the affair of Landen; every one was left to shift for himself; and if it had not been for the regiments of Wyndham, Lumley, and Galway, which covered the retreat over the bridge Neerspeeken, the king himself could scarce have gained it – he was press'd hard, as your honour knows, on every side of him...

It is during this battle that, seeing the French determination to gain the high ground in spite of the murderous Allied bombardment, William is alleged to have exclaimed "Oh! That insolent nation!".

== Sources ==
- Van Alphen, Marc; Hoffenaar, Jan; Lemmers, Alan; Van der Spek, Christiaan (2019). Krijgsmacht en Handelsgeest: Om het machtsevenwicht in Europa (in Dutch). Boom. ISBN 978-90-244-3038-3.
- The Paris Relation of the Battle of Landen [Neerwinden], July 29th 1693. D Rhodes. 1693.
- D'Auvergne, Edward (1693). The History of the Last Campagne in the Spanish Netherlands. Universiteit Gent.
- Black, Jeremy (2011). Beyond the Military Revolution: War in the Seventeenth Century World. Palgrave Macmillan. ISBN 978-0230251564.
- Bodart, Gaston (1908). Militär-historisches Kriegs-Lexikon (1618–1905). Wien und Leipzig, C. W. Stern. ISBN 978-0364323502.
- Bright, James Pierce (1836). A History of England; Volume III (2016 ed.). Palala Press. ISBN 135856860X.
- Castex, Jean-Claude (2012). Combats franco-anglais de la guerre de trente ans et de la ligue d'Augsbourg (in French). Editions du Phare Ouest. ISBN 978-2921668118.
- Chandler, David G (2004). Blenheim preparation: the English army on the march to the Danube: collected essays. Spellmount.
- Childs, John (1991). The Nine Years' War and the British Army 1688–1697: The Operations in the Low Countries. Manchester University Press. ISBN 978-0719034619.
- Childs, John (1987). The British Army of William III, 1689–1702. Manchester University Press. ISBN 978-0719019876.
- Cra'Ster, H. H. E.; Orkney, Lord (1904). Cra’ster, H. H. E. (ed.). ""Letters of the First Lord Orkney during Marlborough's Campaigns."". The English Historical Review. 19 (74): 307–321. doi:10.1093/ehr/XIX.LXXIV.307. JSTOR 548832.
- De la Pause, Guillaume Plantavit (1738). The Life of James Fitz-James Duke of Berwick (2017 ed.). Andesite Press. ISBN 1376209276.
- De Périni, Hardÿ (1896). Batailles françaises V5. Ernest Flammarion, Paris.
- Goulon, Edouard (1961). "Charles Le Goullon (1645–1705): Capitaine Général Des Mineurs de France et La Révocation de l'Edit de Nantes". Bulletin de la Société de l'Histoire du Protestantisme Français (1903–2015) (in French). 107.
- Grant, RG, ed. (2011). 1001 Battles That Changed the Course of History. Universe Publishing. ISBN 978-0789322333.
- Holmes, Richard (2009). Marlborough; England's Fragile Genius. Harper Press. ISBN 978-0007225729.
- Horsley, Walter C, ed. (1904). The chronicles of an old campaigner M. de la Colonie, 1692–1717. J. Murray.
- Knoop, Willem Jan (1895). Krijgs- en geschiedkundige beschouwingen over Willem den derde, 1672–1697: Volume 3. H. A. M. Roelants.
- Lenihan, Pádraig (2016). "The 'Irish Brigade' 1690–1715". Eighteenth-Century Ireland / Iris an Dá Chultúr. 31: 47–74. doi:10.3828/eci.2016.6. JSTOR 26347059.
- Martin, Ronald (2003). "1693: The Year of Battles". Western Society for French History. 31. hdl:2027/spo.0642292.0031.006.
- Van Nimwegen, Olaf (2020). De Veertigjarige Oorlog 1672–1712: de strijd van de Nederlanders tegen de Zonnekoning (The 40 Years War 1672–1712: the Dutch struggle against the Sun King) (in Dutch). Prometheus. ISBN 978-90-446-3871-4.
- Oosterman, Johannes Theodorus (1906). "Neerwinden (29 Juli 1693)". De Tijdspiegel (in Dutch). 63.
- Stapleton, John. M (2003). Forging a Coalition Army: William III, the Grand Alliance, and the Confederate Army in the Spanish Netherlands, 1688–1697. Ohio State University. Archived from the original on 13 March 2022.
- Sterne, Laurence (1782). The beauties of Sterne: including all his pathetic tales, and most distinguished observations on life. Selected for the heart of sensibility (2018 ed.). Forgotten Books. ISBN 0259231916.
- De Vries, Jan (2009). "The Economic Crisis of the 17th Century". Interdisciplinary Studies. 40 (2).
