= Siege of Zoutleeuw =

1705 siege at Zoutleeuw during the War of the Spanish Succession

- Part of the War of the Spanish Succession
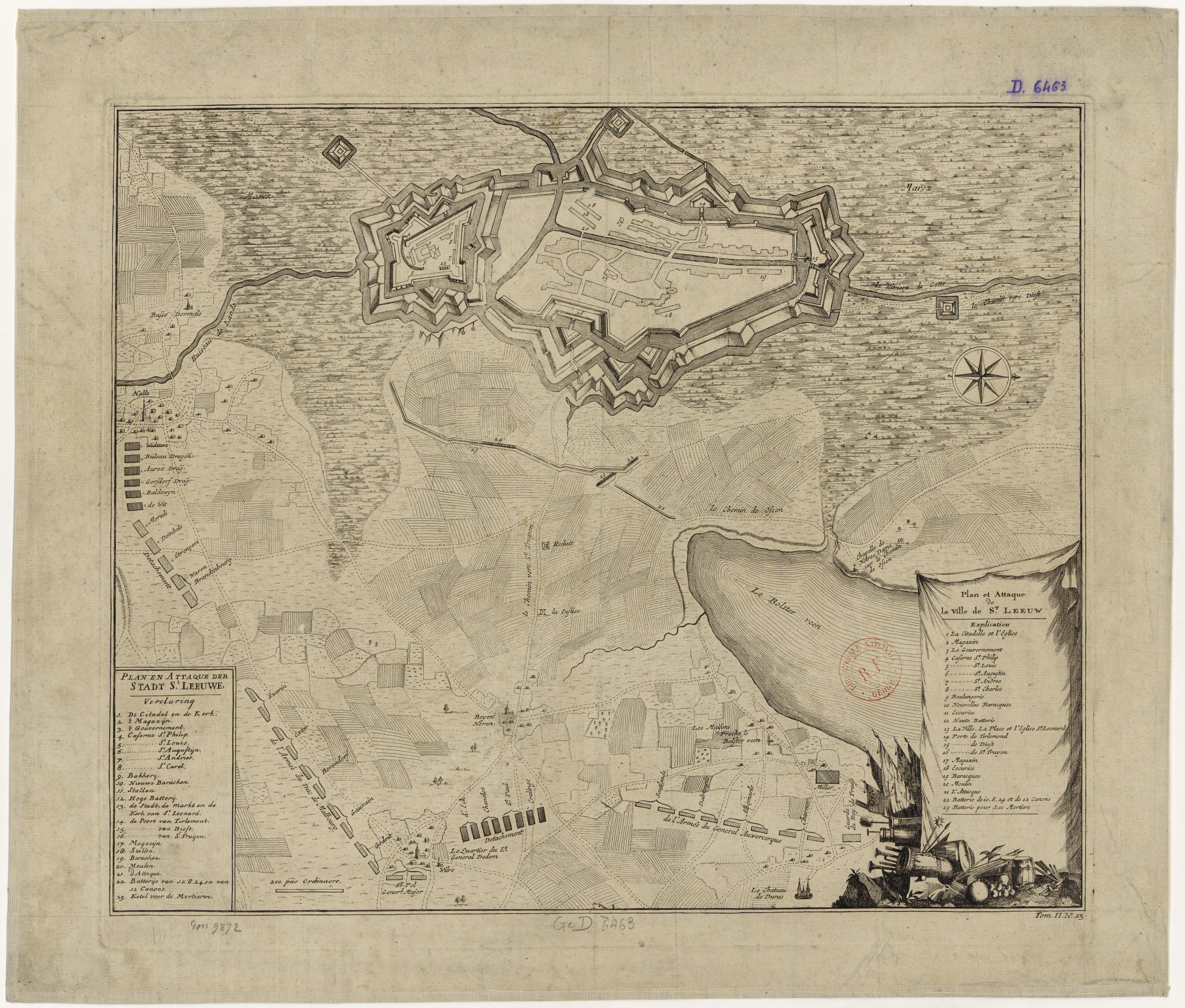
- Dutch plan of the attack of Zoutleeuw (early 18th century)
Date	Investment: 29 August – 5 September 1705 (1 week); Siege: 31 August – 5 September 1705 (5 days)
Location	Zoutleeuw, Flemish Brabant, Belgium 50.833°N 5.104°E
Result	Allied victory

Belligerents
Allies: Dutch Republic; England; Scotland; Holy Roman Empire	France

Commanders and leaders
(Dutch Republic) Lieutenant general Dedem	(Kingdom of France) Brigadier general Dumont

Strength
10,000 men 16 artillery pieces	400 men 18 guns 2 mortars

Casualties and losses
Light	400 men captured or killed 20 guns and mortars captured

The siege of Zoutleeuw or the siege of Léau (29 August 1705 – 5 September 1705) was a siege of the War of the Spanish Succession. Allied troops with 16 artillery pieces under the command of the English Captain general the Duke of Marlborough, besieged and captured the small French-held Brabantine fortified town of Zoutleeuw in the Spanish Netherlands.

== Prelude ==
After piercing the French fortified lines Lines of Brabant at Elixheim on 18 July 1705, the Duke of Marlborough found his plans to bring the French army under Duc de Villeroi to a decisive battle frustrated by the French refusal to engage and their extensive use of field fortifications. The Allies contented themselves by widening the breach in the lines of Brabant by capturing Zoutleeuw to the north of Eliksem on 5 September. Zoutleeuw had been hastily abandoned by the French troops of the Duke of Berwick in July, after the Allied capture of Huy, with gaps being blown up in the walls.

== Siege ==
Zoutleeuw, surrounded by swamps, was taken by a small detachment of 15 battalions and 15 squadron's with 16 artillery pieces under the command of lieutenant general Dedem. The town was invested on 29 August and trenches were opened on 31 August. The Allied siege train arrived from Maastricht on 3 September. That same night, the besiegers attacked and captured a redoubt with little opposition. The infantry battalions carried the trenches within 100 yards of the town, the siege artillery quickly following them.

Before the Allied artillery batteries could open fire, the French governor brigadier general Dumont decided to surrender on 4 September after Dedem threatened to kill the entire garrison of 400 men if they continued to resist. The town and citadel were occupied by 200 Allied troops on 5 September. The garrison marched out on 7 September to become prisoners of war in Maastricht, the officers being allowed to retain their swords and baggage.

== Aftermath ==
The Allies took 10 bronze guns, eight iron guns, two bronze mortars, 10,000 grenades, 200 barrels of gunpowder, 6,000 tools, 2,000 muskets, 100 barrels of musket balls and 18,000 sacks of flour.

The siege was the last major Allied operation near the Meuse river as the strong French fortresses of Namur and Charleroi and more tempting targets in Brabant discouraged them from moving upriver. Marlborough had the Lines of Brabant levelled and the town of Tirlemont dismantled.

== Sources ==
- Ostwald, J. (2006). Vauban Under Siege: Engineering Efficiency and Martial Vigor in the War of the Spanish Succession. Brill. ISBN 978-9004154896.
- Nimwegen, Olaf van (1995). De subsistentie van het leger: Logistiek en strategie van het Geallieerde en met name het Staatse leger tijdens de Spaanse Successieoorlog in de Nederlanden en het Heilige Roomse Rijk (1701-1712) [The subsistence of the Allied and especially the Dutch army during the War of the Spanish Succession] (Thesis) (in Dutch). Universiteit Utrecht.
