= Hendrik Trajectinus, Count of Solms =

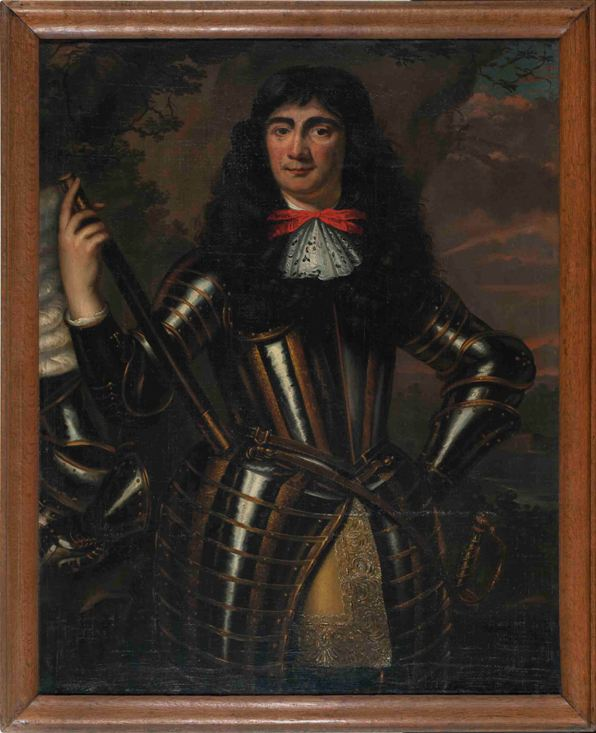
- A portrait by Jan de Baen, likely of Hendrik Trajectinus, Count of Solms
- Born: 1636; Maastricht, Dutch Republic
- Died: 4 August 1693 (aged 56–57); Spanish Netherlands
- Military career
- Allegiance: Dutch Republic
- Branch: Dutch States Army
- Service years: 1670–1693
- Conflicts: Franco-Dutch War; Battle of Seneffe; Siege of Maastricht; Battle of Saint-Denis; Nine Years' War; 1688 Invasion of England; Battle of the Boyne; Siege of Limerick; Battle of Steenkerque; Battle of Landen †

Hendrik Trajectinus, Count of Solms, (1636 – 13 July 1693) was a Dutch States Army officer and nobleman.

Solms was born in Utrecht. A cousin of William of Orange, he served in his armies during the various wars against Louis XIV of France.

In 1688 Solms accompanied William during his invasion of England as part of the Glorious Revolution. It was a contingent of the Blue Guards under his command that first entered London to secure it for William. He again accompanied Orange, now declared William III of England, during his Irish campaign of 1690. He took part in the Battle of the Boyne, a decisive victory over the Irish Army of James II.

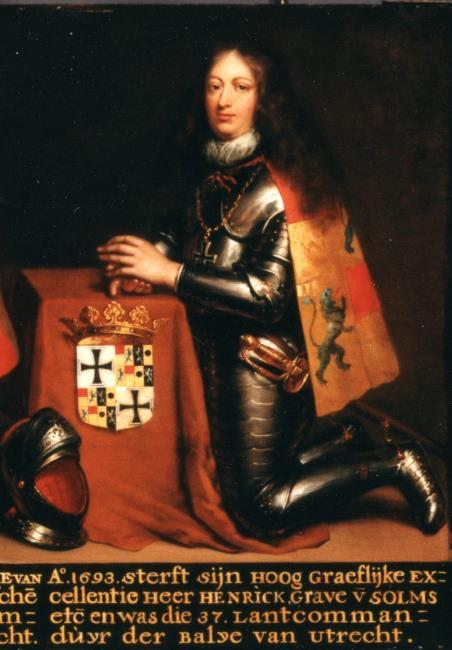

When William departed for England after the unsuccessful Siege of Limerick, he left Solms in command of his army in Ireland. However the Count turned down the offer to lead it during the coming campaign and he was replaced by another Dutchman Godert de Ginkell, 1st Earl of Athlone.

Solms then served with William as part of the Grand Alliance forces fighting in the Low Countries. Commander of the Garde te Voet, he played an important role in the Battle of Steenkerque in 1692. The following year was mortally wounded at the Battle of Landen.

== Bibliography ==
- Childs, John. The Williamite Wars in Ireland. Bloomsbury Publishing, 2007.
