= Landen =

Municipality in Flemish Region, Belgium

- City and municipality
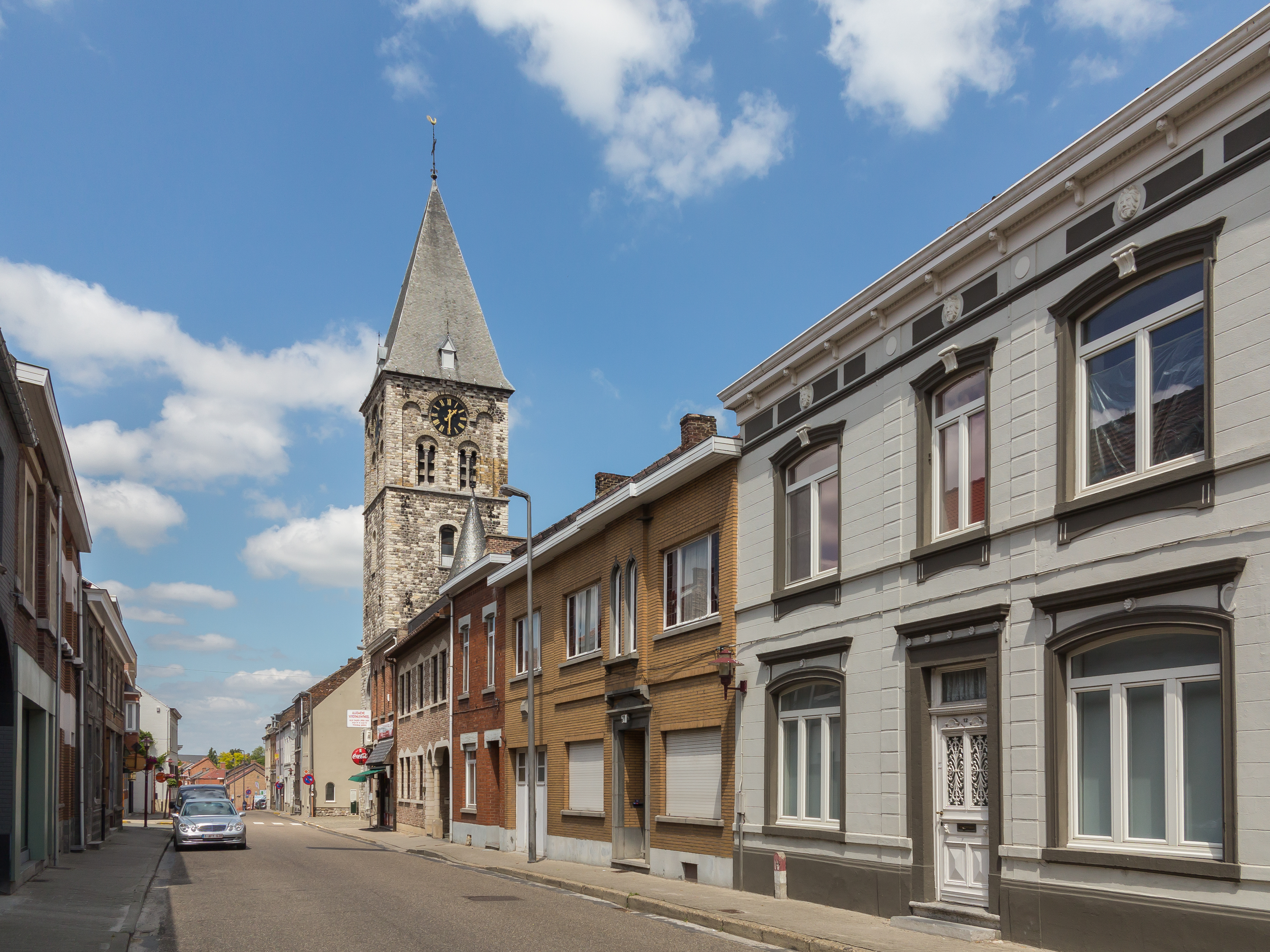
- Parish church St. Gertrude in the city center

- Flag Coat of arms

- Location of Landen in Flemish Brabant
- Interactive map of Landen
- Location in Belgium
- Coordinates: 50°45′N 05°05′E
- Country: Belgium
- Community: Flemish Community
- Region: Flemish Region
- Province: Flemish Brabant
- Arrondissement: Leuven

Government
  - Mayor: Didier Reynaerts (Open Landen)
  - Governing parties: Open Landen & Vooruit

Area
  - Total: 53.3 km^{2} (20.6 sq mi)

Population (2018-01-01)
  - Total: 15,961
  - Density: 299/km^{2} (776/sq mi)
- Postal codes: 3400, 3401, 3404
- NIS code: 24059
- Area codes: 011, 016, 019
- Website: www.landen.be

Landen (Dutch pronunciation: [ˈlɑndə(n)]) is a municipality and city located in the Belgian province of Flemish Brabant. The municipality comprises the city of Landen proper and the villages of Attenhoven, Eliksem, Ezemaal, Laar, Neerlanden, Neerwinden, Overwinden, Rumsdorp, Waasmont, Walsbets, Walshoutem, Wange and Wezeren. On January 1, 2006, Landen had a total population of 14,682. The total area is 54.05 km² which gives a population density of 272 inhabitants per km².

== History ==
Landen is the birthplace of Pippin of Landen, and his daughter, Saint Gertrude, is the city's patron Saint.

On the territory of the municipality two great battles were fought. The first was fought in 1693, during the Nine Years' War between the Anglo-Allied army under William III of England and the French under the Duke of Luxembourg, ending in a French victory. The second Battle of Neerwinden took place during the French Revolutionary Wars between the Austrians under Prince Josias of Coburg and the French under General Dumouriez and ended in an Austrian victory (these battles are commonly referred to as the Battles of Neerwinden). Within the municipal boundaries, one can find multiple Roman tombs.

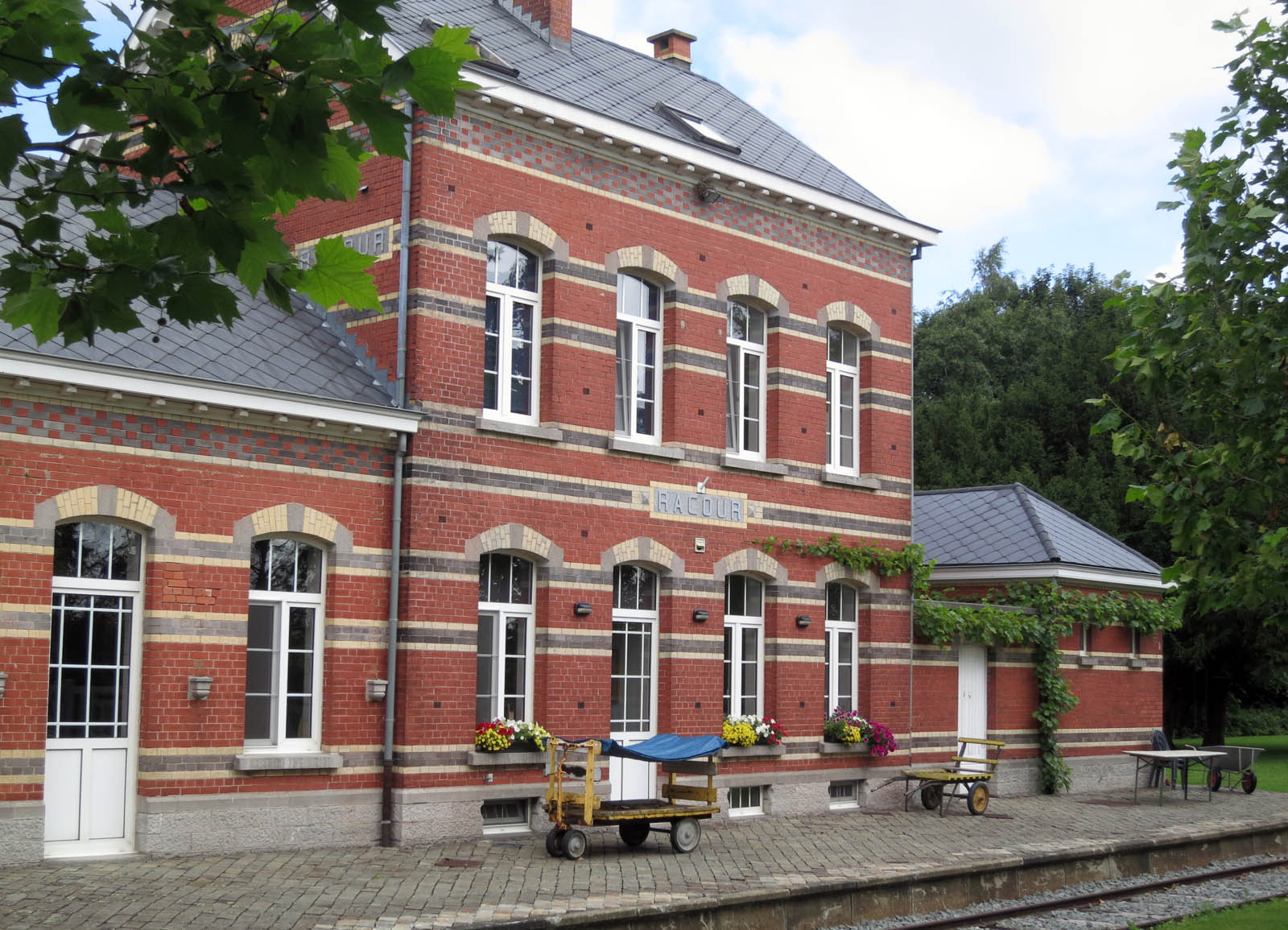
Former railway station of Racour

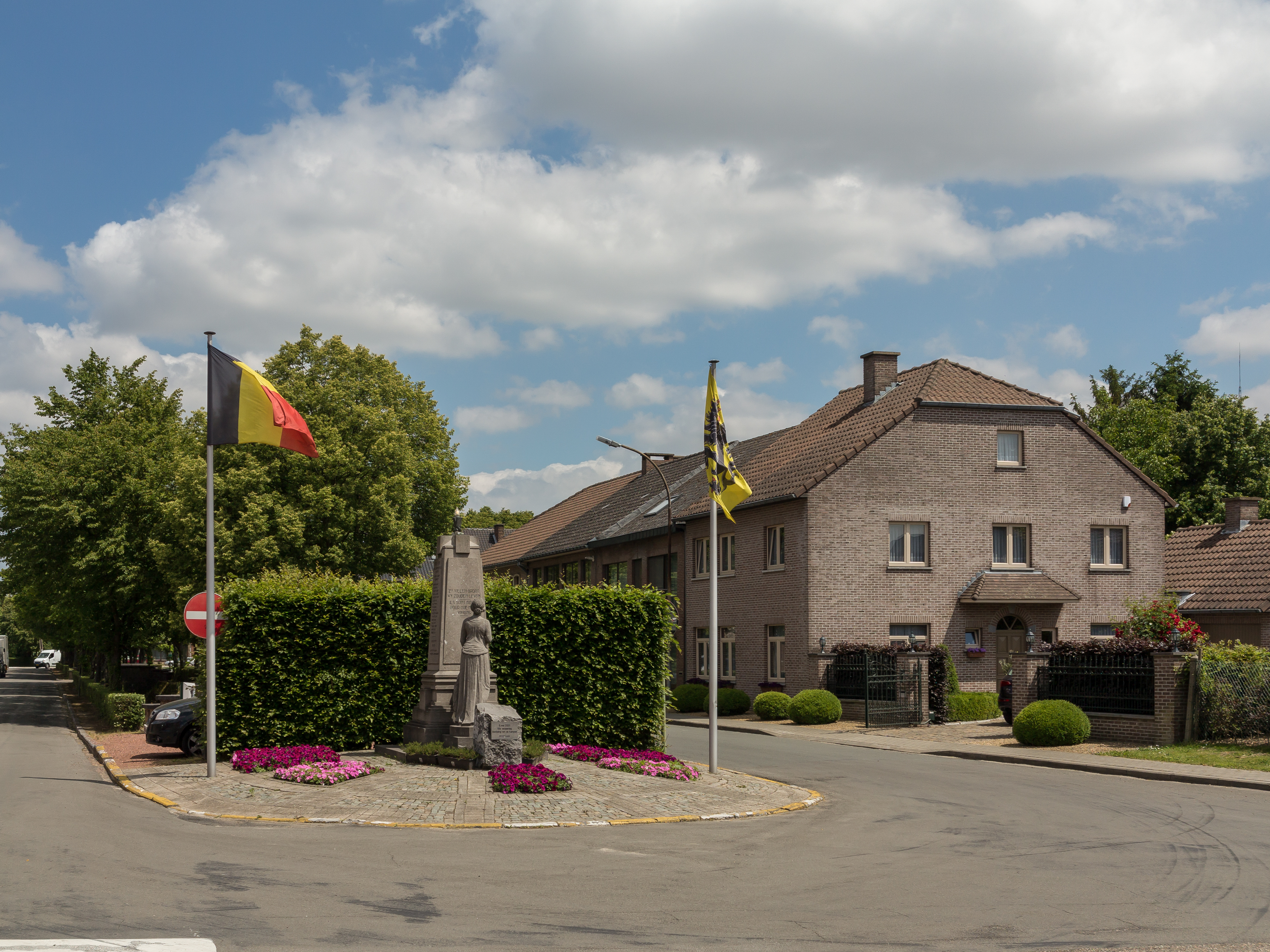
War memorial

== Transport ==
The town is served by Landen railway station.
