= Steenkerque =

Village in Wallonia, Belgium

Coordinates: 50°38′N 4°04′E

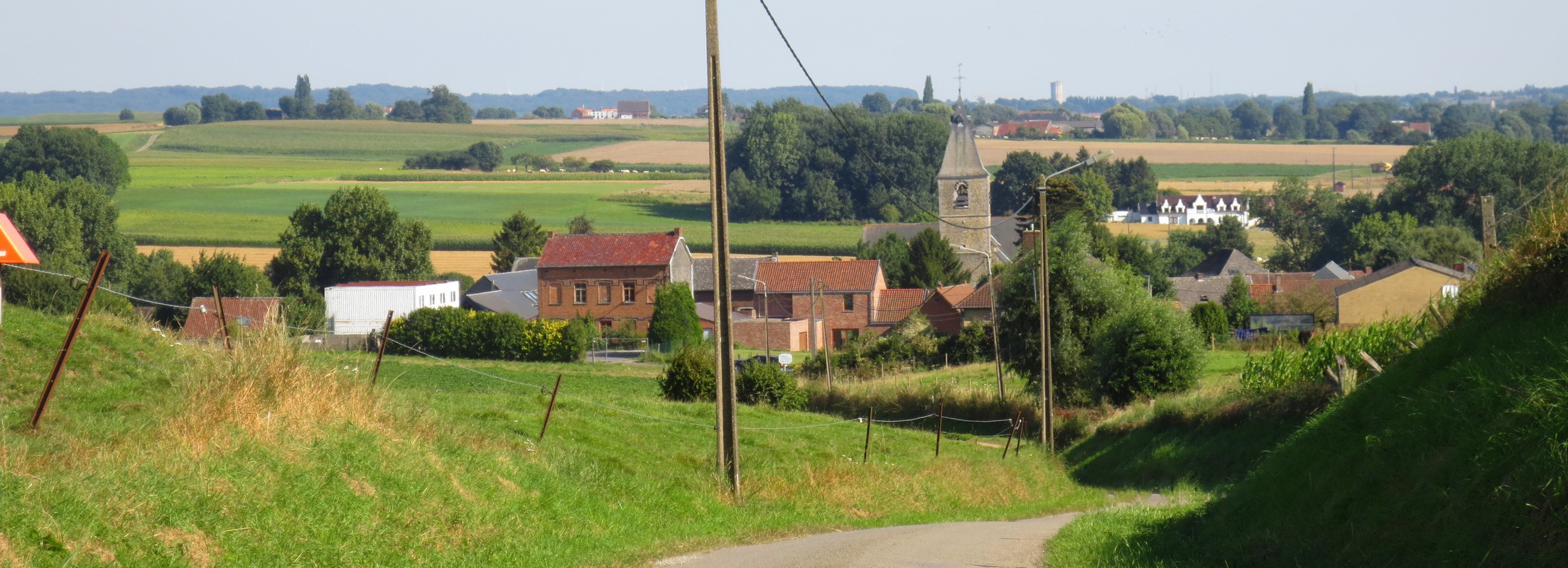
View of Steenkerque

Steenkerque (French pronunciation: [stɛ̃kɛʁk]; Dutch: Steenkerke; in older English references also Steenkirk, Steinkerque, Steinkerke or Steinkirk; Walloon: Stinkerke) is a village of Wallonia and a district of the municipality of Braine-le-Comte, located in Hainaut Province, Belgium, 50 kilometres (31 mi) south-west of Brussels and 10 kilometres (6.2 mi) south of Enghien.

Steenkerque is notable for the Battle of Steenkerque in 1692 during the Nine Years' War, when France defeated a joint English-Scottish-Dutch-German army.

The French movie The African Doctor (in French Bienvenue à Marly-Gomont) was shot in this village in 2015.

The 2019 Tour de France began in Brussels and passed through Steenkerque, then home to "500 âmes, à peine!" ("500 souls, barely!").
