= Wezeren =

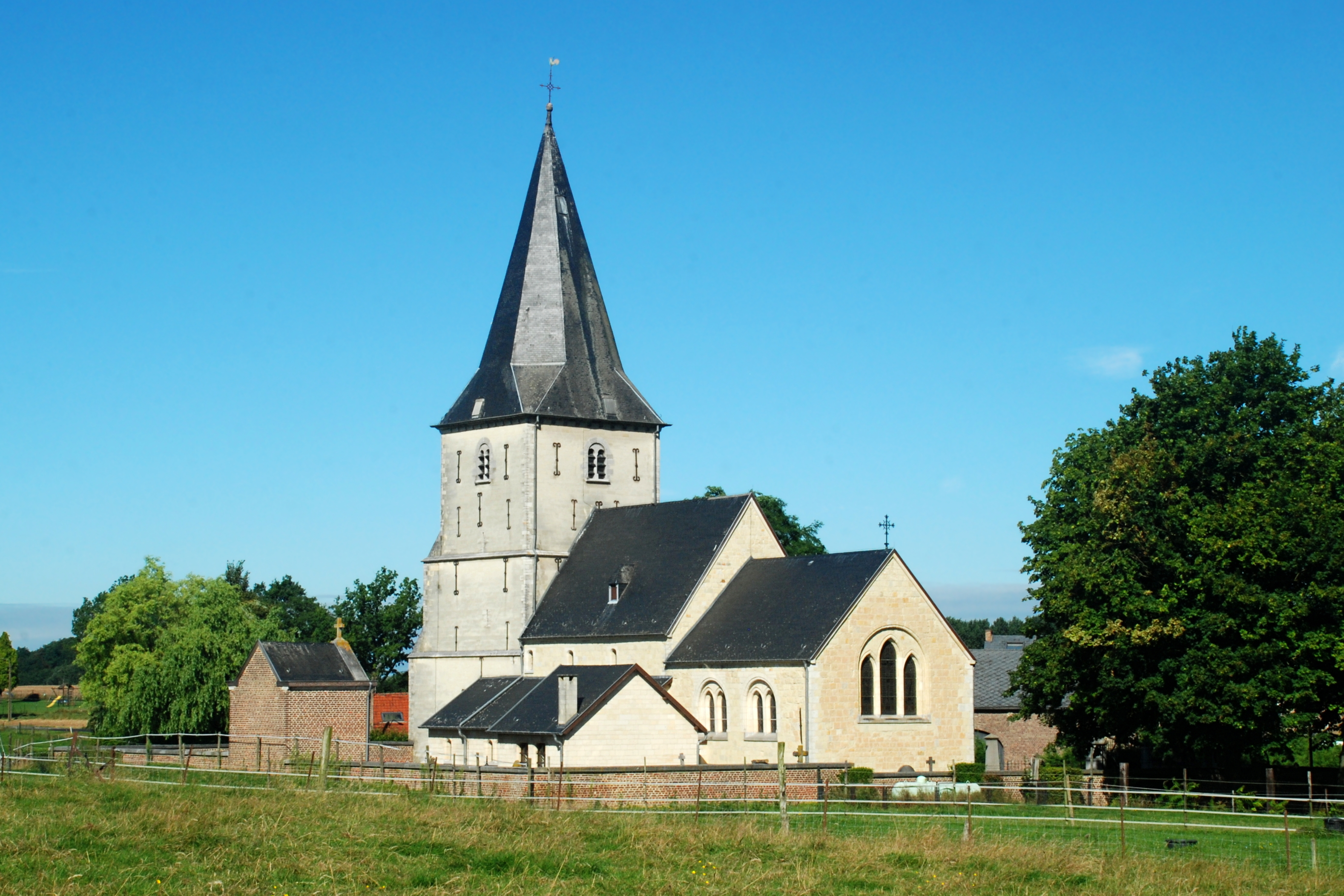
- Wezeren, the village church dedicated to Saint Amandus (c. 1200)

- Location within Belgium Location within Europe
- Coordinates: 50°43′45″N 05°06′15″E
- Country: Belgium
- Region: Flanders
- Province: Flemish Brabant
- Municipality: Landen

Wezeren is a village and a district in the municipality of Landen, in Flemish Brabant, Belgium.

The village is first mentioned in written sources in 1139. In 1573, it consisted of 20 houses. The village church is dedicated to Saint Amandus and dates to c. 1200. Its style is a transitional form between Romanesque and Gothic architecture, with a fortified Romanesque tower. It contains a decorated altar, also Romanesque in style, as well as a 16th-century baptismal font in a local Renaissance style, as well as sculptures from the 17th and 18th centuries.
