= Battle of Elixheim =

1705 conflict in the War of the Spanish Succession

Coordinates: 50.7842°N 5.0097°E

- Part of the War of the Spanish Succession
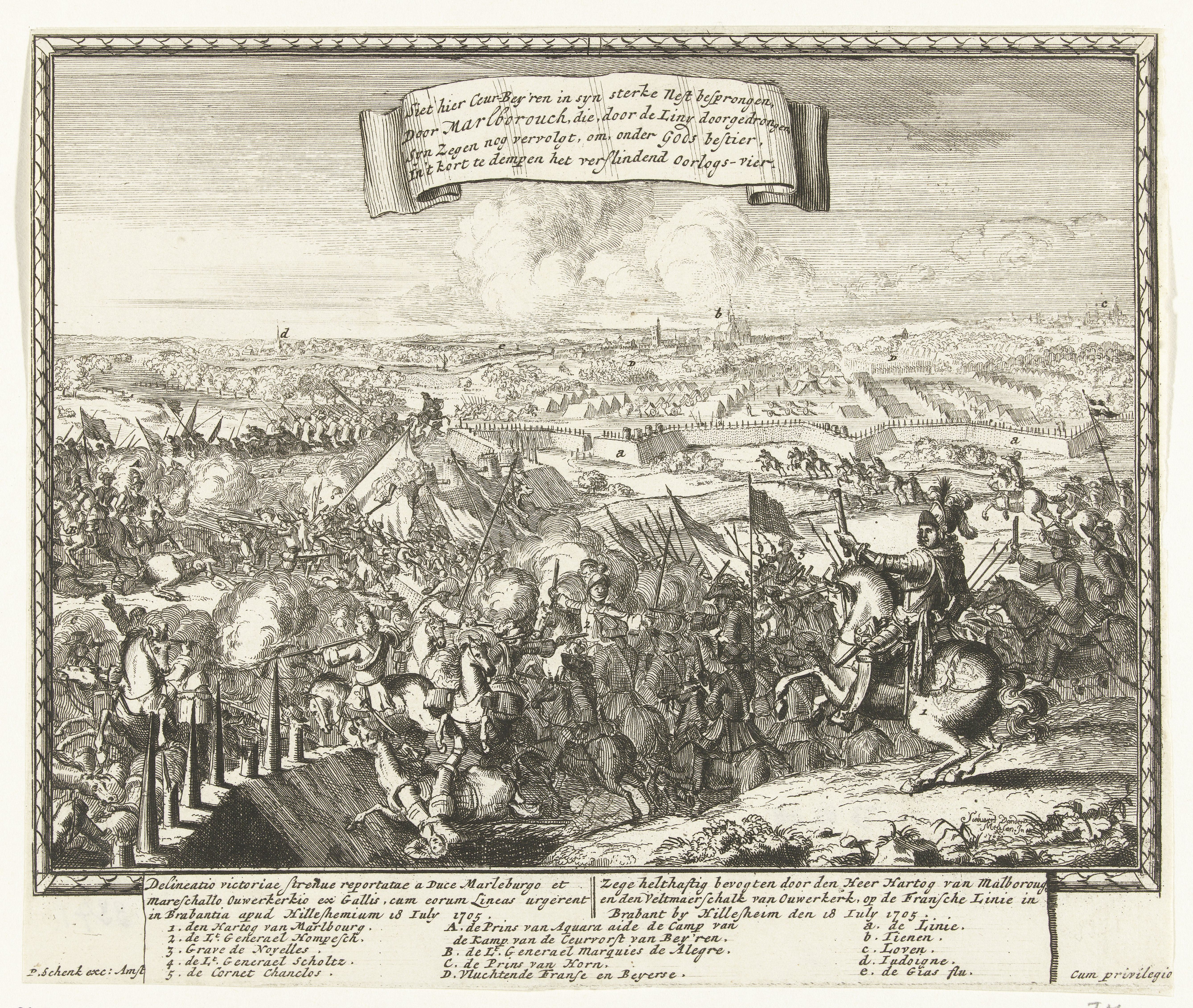
Date	18 July 1705
Location	Eliksem, Brabant, present-day Belgium
Result	Anglo-Dutch victory

Belligerents
Grand Alliance: Dutch Republic; England; Scotland	France

Commanders and leaders
(Kingdom of England) Marlborough (Dutch Republic) Nassau-Ouwerkerk (Dutch Republic) Noyelles	(Kingdom of France) Villeroi (Kingdom of France) Caraman

Strength
70,000 (not all troops were engaged)	70,000 (not all troops were engaged)

Casualties and losses
50–200	3,000

At the Battle of Elixheim, 18 July 1705, also known as the Passage of the Lines of Brabant during the War of the Spanish Succession, the Anglo-Dutch forces of the Grand Alliance, under the Duke of Marlborough and Field Marshal Ouwerkerk, successfully broke through the French Lines of Brabant. These lines were an arc of defensive fieldworks stretching in a seventy-mile arc from Antwerp to Namur. Although the Allies were unable to bring about a decisive battle, the breaking and subsequent razing of the lines would prove critical to the Allied victory at Ramillies the next year.

== Prelude ==
Early in the campaigning season, Marlborough attempted to launch an invasion of France up the Moselle valley. This effort was halted by a combination of supply shortages and an excellent French defensive position in front of Sierck, and Marlborough and his army were recalled by the Dutch States General when Marshall Villeroi attacked and took the fortress of Huy and threatened Liège. Having rushed back to the Low Countries (and forcing Villeroi to retreat behind his defenses), Marlborough retook Huy, and then planned to break through the lines to bring Villeroi to battle.

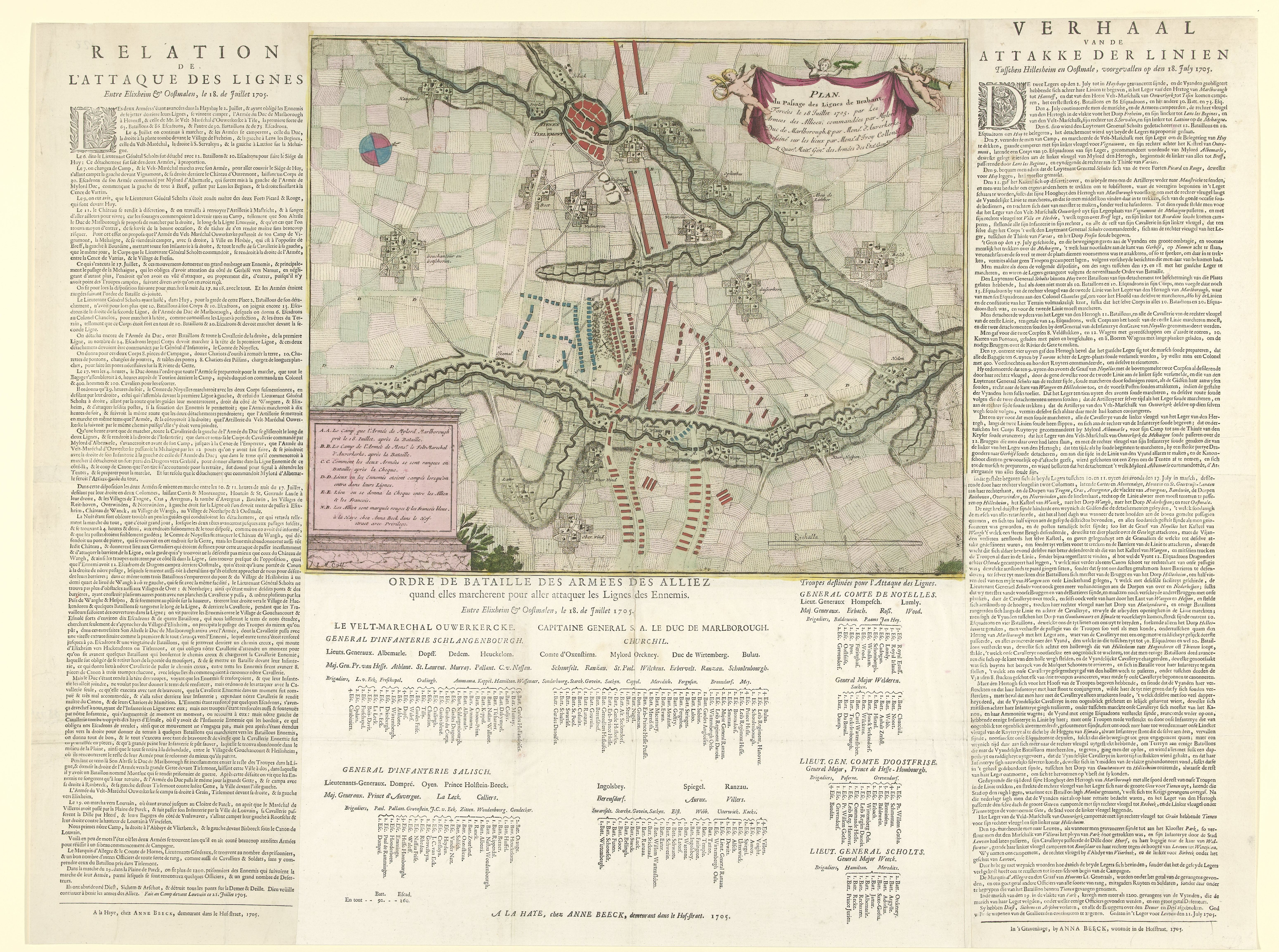
A contemporary account of the breakthrough in French and Dutch with a map and the order of battle of the Anglo-Dutch army

On the eve of the Battle of Elixheim, 17 July 1705, Allied troops, consisting of 22 battalions and 30 squadrons, under Noyelles, Hompesch and Scholten attacked the castle of Wange that protected a bridge across the Gete river and a part of the Lines of Brabant. In two columns, the Allies marched forward. Both columns were preceded by a detachment of grenadiers. The attack on the castle itself was to be carried out by the left column, at a stone bridge over the Geete, close to the village of Nederhespen. Sixty experienced grenadiers were ordered to take control of the Geete crossing point. They then had to break through the French lines through a flank attack and wait for reinforcements. The cavalry of the right column had the task of routing the enemy dragoons at Orsmael. 16 June at 9 pm, the advance had begun. However, due to various complications, it would take until 4am the next day for the first troops to arrive at the river. Nevertheless, the attack went smoothly. Poor reconnaissance by the French meant that the French had been unaware of the Dutch advance. The castle, occupied by 30 French soldiers, was quickly taken and the French lines also offered little resistance. Noyelles' right-wing column broke through the lines at Over- and Nederhespen without a fight.

== Breakthrough ==
On the evening of 17 July Marlborough sent the Dutch troops under Marshal Nassau-Ouwerkerk in a feint southward towards Namur, drawing Villeroi and 40,000 men after them. Overnight he marched with his own English and Scottish troops northwards to the small village of Eliksem (Elixheim) where he joined the Allied troops under Noyelles. After a cavalry battle in which Marlborough personally participated, the Allies managed to disperse the French squadrons with heavy losses. The Dutch cavalry under Hompesch then captured the French artillery. With support from the infantry that had been deployed, the French cavalry tried to recover, but a second charge overwhelmed them for good. Only the discipline of the French infantry under Caraman managed to prevent the French force from being annihilated. In square, harassed and threatened on all sides by the Allied cavalry, they held firm and made a successful retreat. The Allies however were able to break through the lines. Realising this, Villeroi withdrew his army to the west, behind the river Dyle.

== Aftermath ==
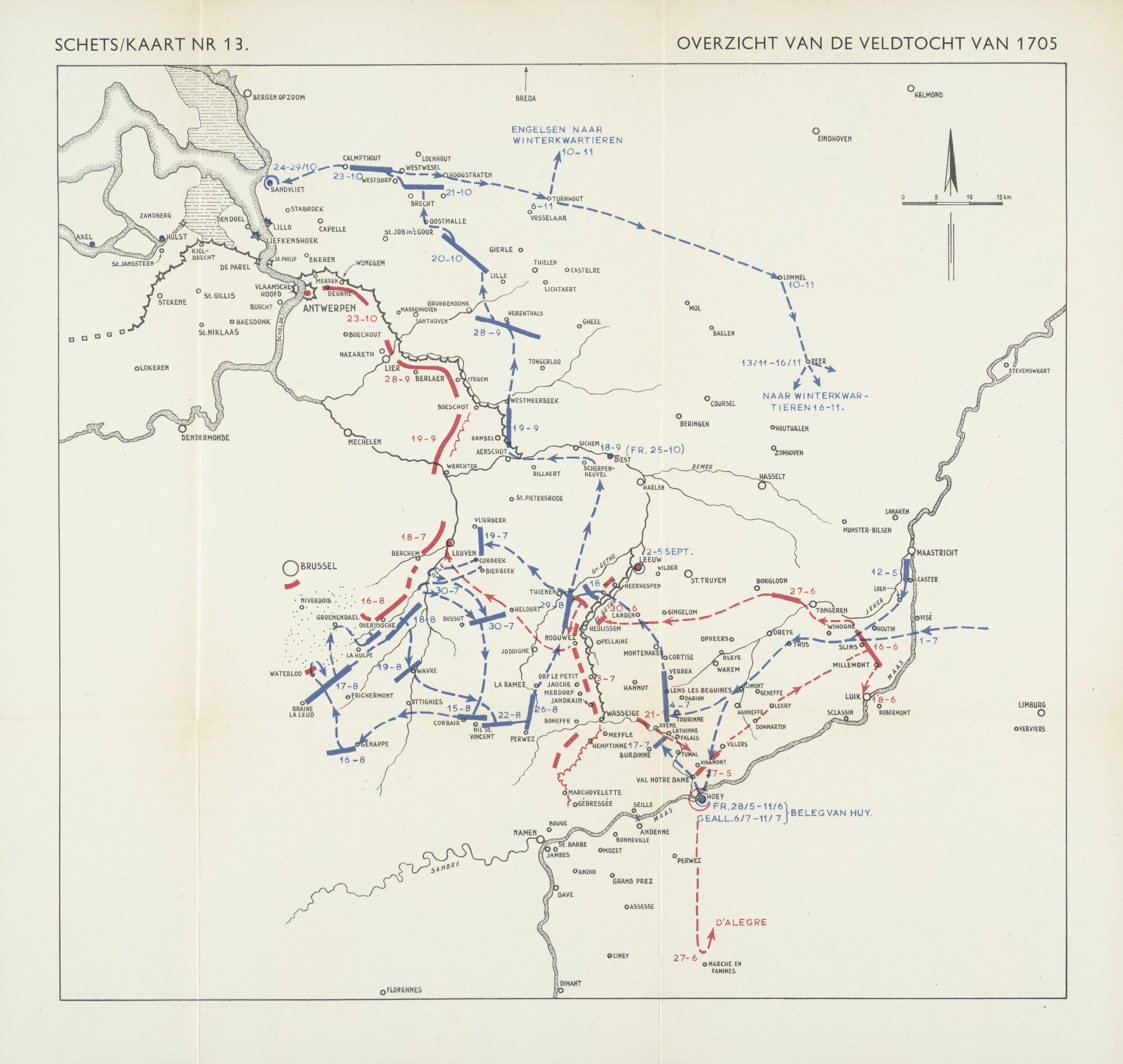
1705 campaign map of the Low Countries. The Allies in blue and the French in red

Unable to pursue the French with any vigour on the day of the battle due to the exhaustion of his men, who had marched all night and then fought an intense battle, Marlborough nonetheless still hoped to bring Villeroi to battle. Dutch general Slangenburg, 'hero of Ekeren', argued that the Allies should advance to Leuven. Leuven was necessary to secure the logistics of the Allied army if they wanted to capture Brussels and would perhaps have forced Villeroi to fight. Marlborough felt something for his plan, but told Slangeburg to convince Nassau-Ouwerkerk and Daniël van Dopff, who were against this plan of action. Slangenburg was, however, unable to convince them. Dopff argued that the troops would be too tired and that it would be difficult to construct bridges across the Gete in time. Marlborough did not challenge the opinions of Ouwerkerk and Dopff and, instead of advancing on Leuven, made a circumferential move west of the lines with 80,000 troops to cut Villeroy off from Brussels. As a result, he ran into logistical problems and a month of frustrating manoeuvring followed. On 30 July an attempt to cross the Dyle failed.

=== The unfought battle at Waterloo ===
A final effort in early August, using wagons loaded with supplies to remove his dependency on his lines of communication, forced Villeroi's army to make a stand close to Waterloo. On the 18th of August Marlborough first attempted a flanking manoeuvre, but the 13,000 troops under his brother, Charles Churchill, were forced to turn back when they encountered the French in the Sonian Forest. Desperate, Marborough now planned to frontally assault the French positions on high ground above of the opposite bank of Yse river, a tributary of the Dyle. However, his brother's contingent lost their way in the forest, resulting in a waste of precious time. At the same time, intense discussions were held with the Dutch generals, particularly with Slangenburg. While the Dutch generals did not veto the attack and granted their approval, many of them refused any responsibility for what they perceived as a risky endeavor. The positions of the 70,000-strong French army were very strong and they were somewhat aggrieved that they had not been informed by Marlborough about his plans.

Once Charles Churchill's corps had returned, Ouwerkerk's infantry on the left was ready for battle, but Marlborough still hadn't taken the necessary steps to organize his part of the line. It was then, around 5pm, that the Dutch field deputies decided to convene a council of war, during which it became clear that most of the Dutch generals were against the plan. They indicated that they were only familiar with the French positions on the left wing, and expressed the need to scout the other positions before they could make a proper judgment. Slangenburg, Count Tilly and Ernst Wilhelm von Salisch were tasked with this scouting mission. However, the time involved in this process equated to abandoning the attack plan, as it would postpone the battle by a day, while giving the French time to further fortify their positions. Marlborough thereupon accused Slangenburg of obstruction after which the Dutchman expressed doubts about his suitability to serve as supreme commander. Disagreements between the allied generals ran so high that a political crisis between the Dutch Republic and England threatened. Willem Buys managed to calm tempers by promising Marlborough that Slangenburg would be suspended - formally for health reasons. However, Marlborough's demand that the field deputies also be sent home was dismissed. Although British historians have traditionally portrayed the unfought battle at the Yse as a case of Dutch obstruction, several of Marlborough's most senior British generals also opposed an attack. One contemporary witness noted that the Earl of Orkney opposed it with the same 'earnestness' as Slangenburg.

However it may be, the Allies had to content themselves with the capture of the fortress of Zoutleeuw (also called Leeuw) and the levelling of the Lines of Brabant between Zoutleeuw and the Meuse.
