= Siege of Huy (1703) =

Siege during the War of the Spanish Succession

- Part of the War of the Spanish Succession
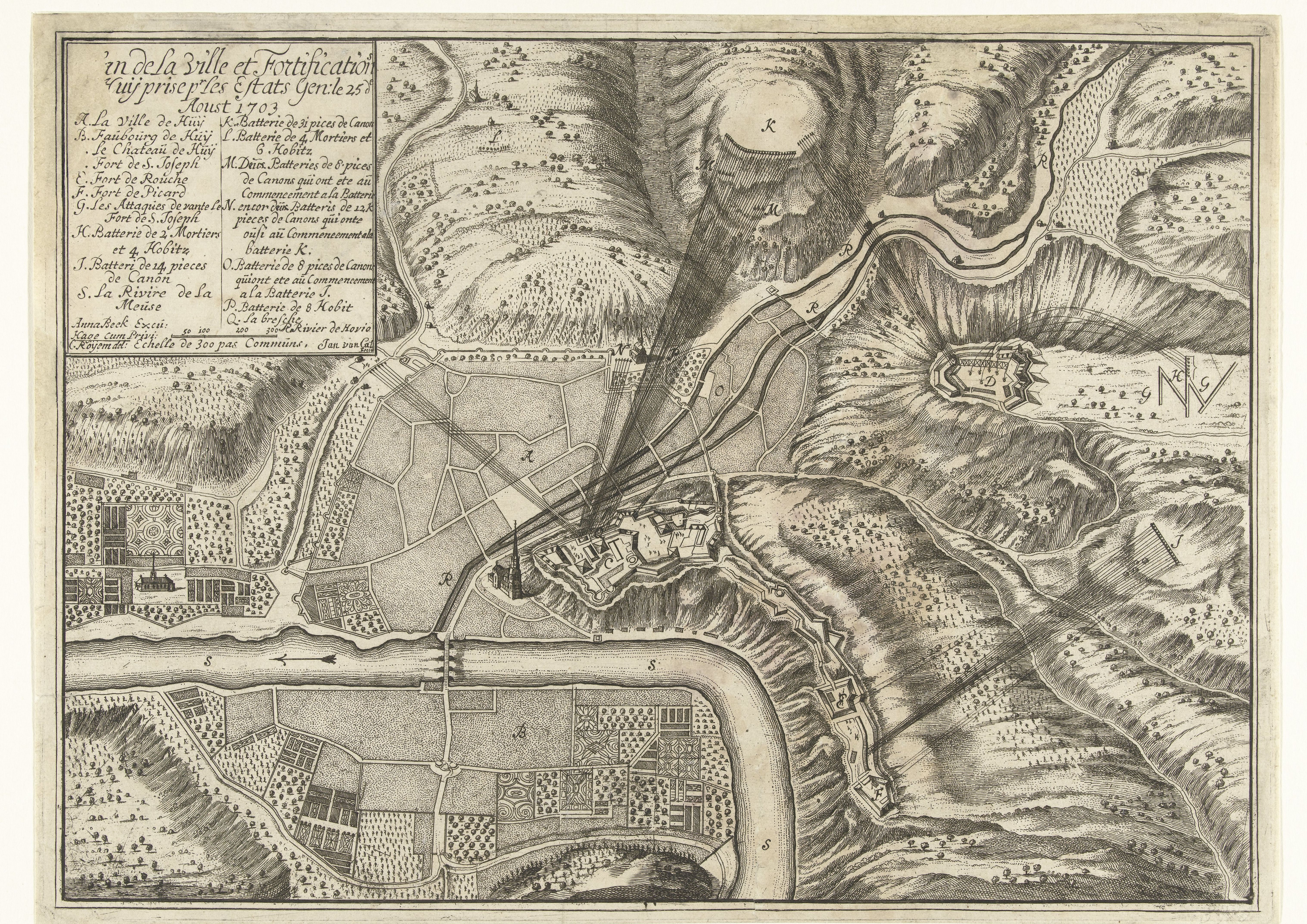
- Map of the Siege of Huy
Date	16–25 August 1703
Location	Huy, Spanish Netherlands (modern-day Belgium)
Result	Allied victory

Belligerents
Dutch Republic; Kingdom of England	Kingdom of France

Commanders and leaders
(England) Duke of Marlborough (Dutch Republic) Count of Noyelles	(Kingdom of France) Millon

Strength
15,000–18,000; 12,400 Infantry; 3,200 Cavalry; 124 Guns	1,000

Casualties and losses
53 killed or wounded	185 killed or wounded; the survivors became prisoners of war

The Siege of Huy took place on the 16–25 August 1703 between the Grand Alliance and the Kingdom of France in the Spanish Succession. Under the command of the Duke of Marlborough and Count of Noyelles the alliance shelled and captured a French garrison of Huy.

== Background ==
At the verge of the succession, the allies wanted to seize and secure the Meuse river crossing and eliminate French strongholds located near it. As the fortifications of Huy threatened Allied communications and lines of advance in the Spanish Netherlands. Capturing the town and its fortress improved Allied movement for the campaign, shortened supply lines, and removed a defensive obstacle that could be used to support indirect marches and reinforce nearby French positions.

== Battle ==
Marlborough had a field army of about 15,000-18,000 men strong, about 3,200 cavalry including 3rd Dragoons, 12,400 infantry including the 33rd Regiment of Foot that played a key role in this siege, 124 artillery pieces including 118 cannons, 4 howitzers and 2 mortars. Based on the contemporary siege plan, the French army was less than 3000 men of the garrison. The town and fortress complex was invested on the 15th, and the town fell the next day. Covering French forces were either driven off or withdrew, and the forts Joseph and Picard fell on the 24th. A significant breach was made in the castle wall and the governor surrendered. These troops were later exchanged for the allied troops taken at Tongres.

== Aftermath ==
The immediate result was the surrender and evacuation of the French garrison and Allied occupation of the town and citadel. The capitulation freed the Meuse crossing at Huy, removed the French forward strongpoint that had threatened Allied lines of communication, and secured an axis for advance and supply in the 1703 Low Countries campaign.

== Bibliography ==
- Nimwegen, Olaf van (1995). De subsistentie van het leger: Logistiek en strategie van het Geallieerde en met name het Staatse leger tijdens de Spaanse Successieoorlog in de Nederlanden en het Heilige Roomse Rijk (1701-1712) [The subsistence of the Allied and especially the Dutch army during the War of the Spanish Succession] (Thesis) (in Dutch). Universiteit Utrecht.
- Generalstabes (1878). Feldzüge des Prinzen Eugen von Savoyen [Prince Eugene of Savoy's Campaigns] (in German). Vol. 5. VERLAG DES K. K. GENERALSTABES.
