= Battle of Steenkerque =

1692 battle of the Nine Years' War

Coordinates: 50.6333°N 4.0667°E

- Part of the Nine Years' War
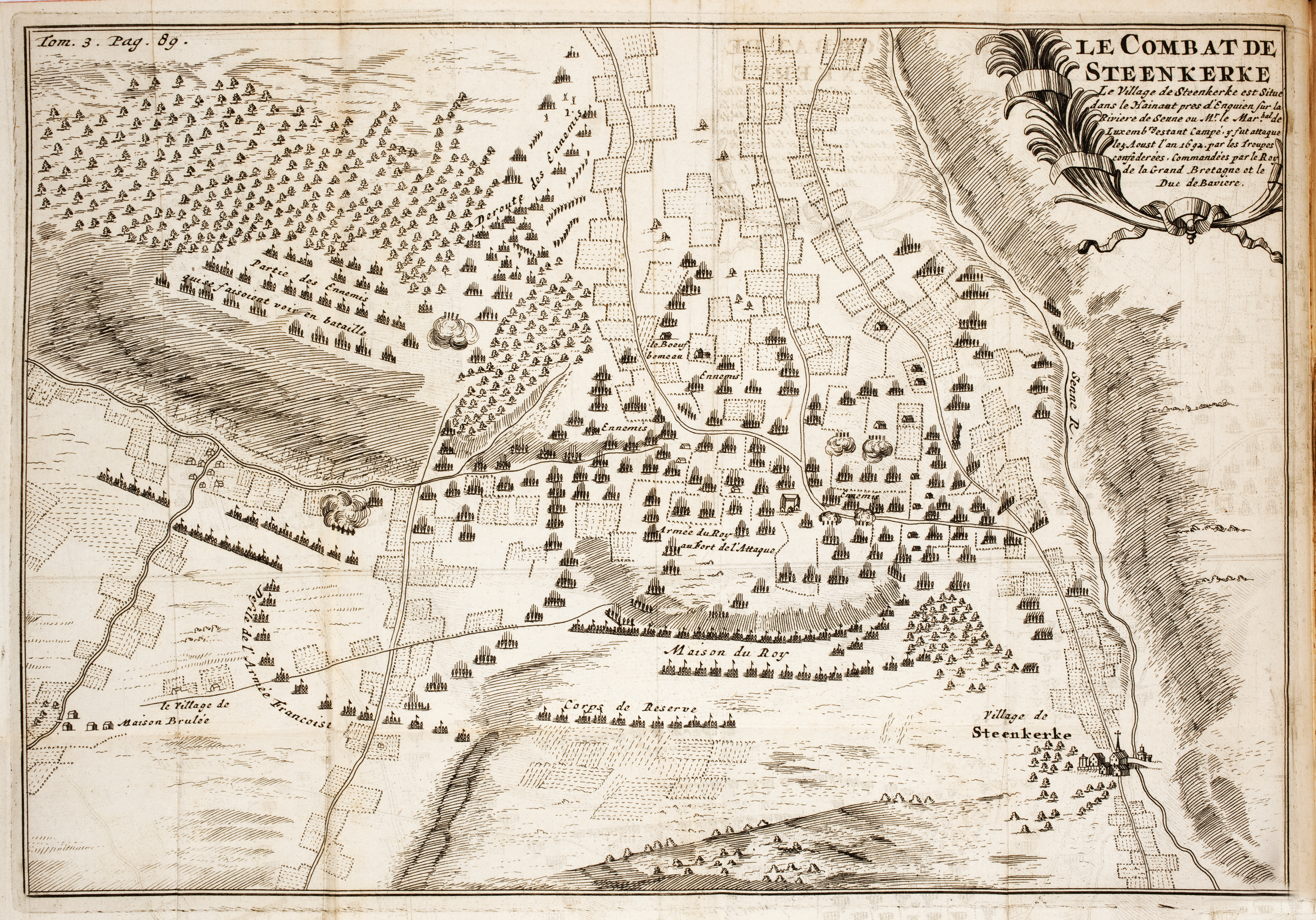
- Map of the battle
Date	3 August 1692
Location	Steenkerque, Belgium
Result	See Aftermath

Belligerents
Kingdom of France	Dutch Republic; Kingdom of England; Kingdom of Scotland

Commanders and leaders
(Kingdom of France) Luxembourg (Kingdom of France) Montal (Kingdom of France) Boufflers	(Dutch Republic) (Kingdom of England) William III (Dutch Republic) Württemberg (Dutch Republic) Solms (Kingdom of Scotland) Hugh Mackay † (Dutch Republic) Henry Casimir II (Dutch Republic) Overkirk

Strength
80,000	80,000

Casualties and losses
7,000–8,000 killed or wounded	8,000 to 10,000 killed or wounded, 1,300 captured

The Battle of Steenkerque (Note: Also known as Steenkerke, Steenkirk, Steynkirk or Steinkirk) was fought on 3 August 1692, during the Nine Years' War, near Steenkerque in Belgium, then part of the Spanish Netherlands. A French force under Marshal François-Henri de Montmorency, duc de Luxembourg, repulsed a surprise attack by an Allied army led by William of Orange. After several hours of heavy fighting, the Allies withdrew, repulsing a French counterattack as they did so.

== Background ==
Luxembourg had already achieved his main objective for 1692 by capturing Namur in June and wanted to avoid battle. He therefore adopted a strong defensive position facing north-west, with his right anchored on the Zenne at Steenkerque and his left near Enghien, assuming the Allies would not dare to attack it. This approach conformed with then accepted tactical wisdom, with battles considered too risky and unpredictable, unless there was a clear chance of defeating the enemy.

William of Orange had replaced Waldeck as commander of the Allied army, which was encamped about Halle. He would probably have done as Luxembourg expected and not risked an attack had he not seen an opportunity to take the French by surprise. Accordingly, before dawn on 3 August he ordered his troops to move against the French right.

William had prepared the attack thoroughly. 300 carefully chosen cavalry and dragoons took up positions a short distance from the French army camp. The French paid no attention to them as they assumed these were covering troops for Allied foragers. In reality, however, they served to enable 800 pioneers equipped with axes and shovels to widen forest paths, fill ditches and make passages in hedges unnoticed. Once the pioneers had finished their work, Lieutenant General Württemberg was to take possession of Steenkerke with a vanguard of 5,000 to 6,000 Dutch, English, Danish and German infantrymen, and artillery of six low three-pounders and ten regimental pieces. After the French were driven out, he would have to hold out there until the rest of the army arrived.

The main attack would be carried out by three assault columns:

The first column under the Prince of Nassau-Usingen, with a strength of 8,000 men, composed of the English Ramsay brigade and the Dutch Fagel brigade.

The second column, commanded by the Frisian stadtholder, Henry Casimir II, with a strength of 6,000 to 7,000 men, composed of the Dutch brigades of Salisch and l'Ecluse.

The third column under the Count of Solms, with a strength of 11,000 men comprised the Dutch, English and Scottish Guards, Churchill's English Brigade and Ellenberger's Danish brigade.

Each assault column was equipped with six long three-pounders and 12 regimental pieces. 15,000 horsemen under the Earl of Athlone had the order to follow the infantry and support its attack wherever possible.

== Battle ==
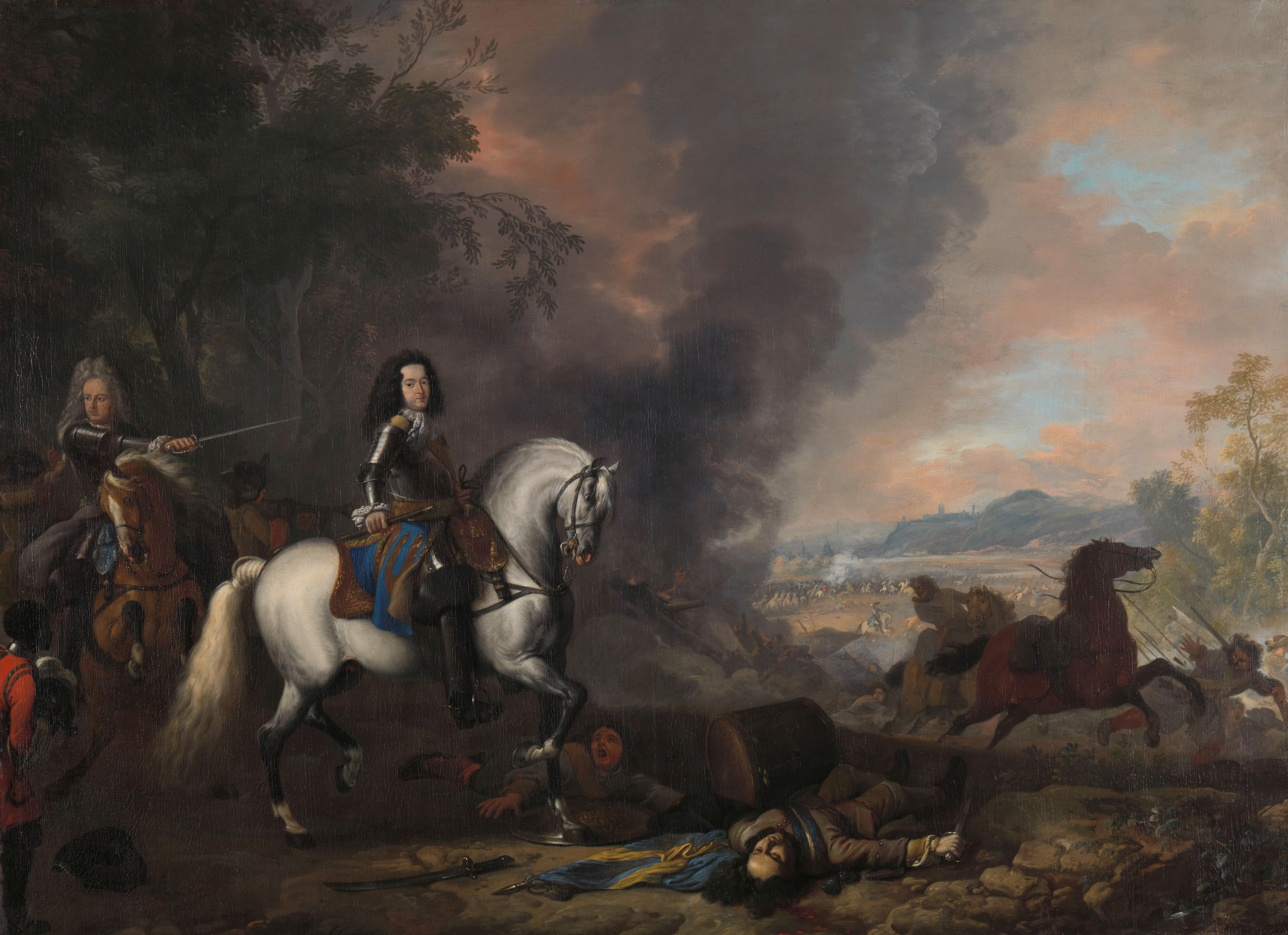
Henry Casimir II, Prince of Nassau-Dietz, in battle. By Jan van Huchtenburg, 1692.

Led by the Duke of Wurttemberg the Allied advance guard of infantry and pioneers deployed silently around 5:00 a.m. close to the French encampments. The day began well for the Allies. After a short firefight, Wurttemberg managed to take control of a hill and forest opposite Steenkerke and then deployed artillery, with which he at 9:00 a.m. started methodically cannonading the enemy. For further progress, he depended on the arrival of the main force.

To Württemberg's anger, it took all morning before Lieutenant General Hugh Mackay showed up with the infantry of the first column. Where the other two columns were at the time was unknown to him. Whether through bad luck or mismanagement, the cavalry, which had been supposed to follow the infantry, had deployed in front of the infantry, behind Mackay and Wurttemberg, thus preventing the infantry of the columns under Henry Casimir and Solms from reaching the front line.

Montal, the extremely experienced commander of the French vanguard, meanwhile, hurriedly formed up his troops. William of Orange considered it unwise to wait any longer and despite the delay, loss of surprise and the absence of 2 of the 3 columns, ordered Wurttemberg and Mackay around 1:00 p.m. to finally begin the main attack. Their troops captured the first three lines of trenches and came very close to achieving a stunning victory. However, Montal held off the initial Allied attack long enough to enable Luxembourg to bring up his main force.

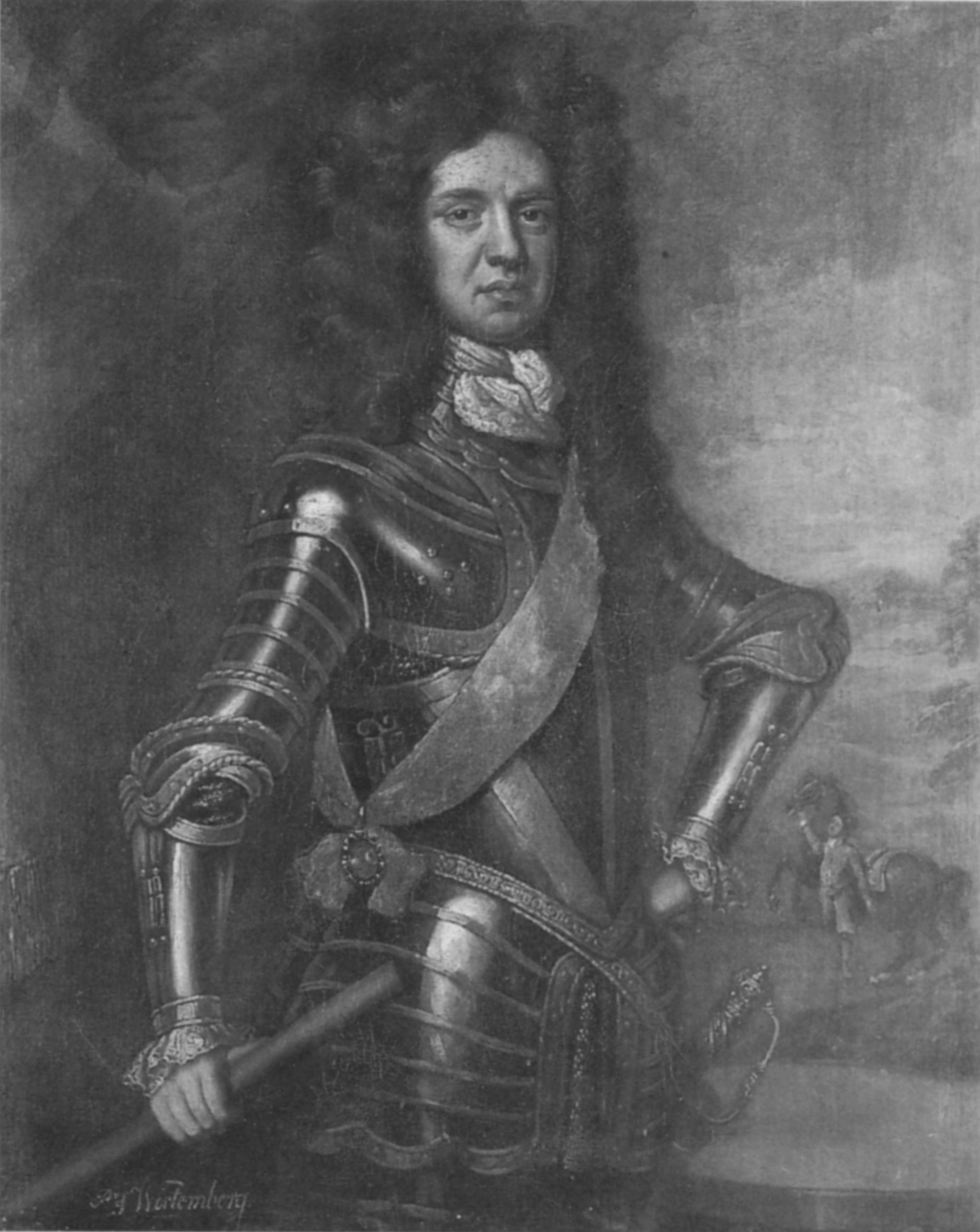
Duke of Württemberg

The piecemeal deployment of the Allied main body meant little or no attempt was made to engage the French centre. With his troops spread out over the fortifications and under huge pressure from the French, Mackay asked William for permission to withdraw and reorganise. Ordered to continue the assault, he allegedly said 'The Lord's will be done' and taking his place at the head of his regiment was killed with many of his division. Over 8,000 of the 15,000 Allied troops engaged became casualties, with five British regiments almost wiped out. Around 6:00 p.m., William decided to call off the attack. Württemberg raged to Mérode-Westerloo, the young adjutant who came to deliver this news, that he would have been able to drive the French out of their positions if the second and third columns had shown up, when now only 14,000 men had been at his disposal. Mérode-Westerloo rode back to the king and later wrote: I couldn't restrain myself from saying to the king that a great opportunity had been lost to defeat the French. He smiled under his big hat, but said nothing.

Seeing an opportunity for a decisive victory, Luxembourg committed the elite Maison du Roi to a frontal assault, reinforced by troops from Enghien under Boufflers. Contesting every step, Wurttemberg's corps plus the remnants of the troops of the first column were driven back. The counterattack, however, proved very costly to the French, for the columns of Henry Casimir and Solms had finally reached the edge of the forest and were now getting into combat with the French. The battle only ended with the coming of darkness. William then ordered his troops to fall back on their original positions around Halle, covered by a rear-guard under Hendrik Van Nassau-Ouwerkerk. The French quickly called off the pursuit, having suffered losses of around 7,000-8,000 killed or wounded themselves.

== Aftermath ==
For French historian Jean-Claude Castex and Belgian historian Erik Wauters, it was a victory for the French, as Louis XIV's army repelled the Allied attack and held the ground, inflicting higher casualties to their opponents though in numerical inferiority (the Allied lost 10,000 casualties and 1,300 prisoners and the French captured 9 Allied standards and 13 cannons). German historian A. Straehle points out that the Allied had to leave the grounds, after the king of England called off the battle.

But according to the historian John A. Lynn both sides could claim victory: the French for repelling the Allied attack, holding their ground and possibly foiling an attack on Namur, and the Allies for bloodying the noses of the French and perhaps preventing them from advancing towards Liège. After the battle, the two armies continued to oppose each other for the rest of the summer, but nothing significant happened before they went to winter quarters.

During the battle, the Allies had held the advantage of greater firepower. They fought with the new flintlock muskets while the French had still fought with the old muskets. When Louis XIV heard from his generals that they would have lost had the Allied attack been better coordinated, Louis immediately demanded that his infantry be rearmed with the new musket. However, due to problems with manufacturers and resistance within the French officer corps, it took several years before every infantryman was equipped with the new weapons.

Following the battle, some English politicians claimed their heavy losses were caused not through incompetence, but a deliberate act by Solms, and demanded his removal. These allegations were primarily driven by anti-Dutch sentiment and opposition to the war within Parliament, and cannot be substantiated. Presented with these claims when he returned to London in October, William simply agreed to consider it. Solms died of wounds received at Landen the following year.

== Steenkirk cravat ==
An article of dress was named after the battle. A steenkirk (also Steinquerque or Stinquerque in the mémoirs of Abbé de Choisy) was a lace cravat loosely or negligently worn, with long lace ends. According to Voltaire's L'Âge de Louis XIV, it was in fashion after the Battle of Steenkerque, where the French gentlemen had to fight with disarranged cravats on account of the surprise sprung by the Allies.

The Steenkirk cravat was a popular article in both men's and women's fashion in France for years later. It spread from France to England, where it also was worn by both women and men.

== In popular culture ==
A French-language novel by the Belgian journalist and author René Henoumont was published in 1979 under the title La maison dans le frêne (The House in the Ash Tree), with the explanatory subtitle ou la bataille de Steenkerque (or the Battle of Steenkerque). The work is organised into 12 parts, corresponding with the months of the year. Each part contains between 2 and 4 chapters. The narrator and author tells the reader about his (mostly autobiographical) life in the village of Steenkerque as he ponders life, nature, gardening and wars. In his silent dialogue with the nature around, the trees become the men who once waged war in the Belgian village.

The battle, Mackay, and other figures involved are a recurring reference in Tristram Shandy. Tristram's uncle, Toby, fought at Steenkerque, along with other battles of the campaign. Uncle Toby follows the English line in blaming Solms for the defeat and heavy English losses.

== Sources ==
- Atkinson, CT (1938). "The British Losses at Steinkirk 1692". Journal of the Society for Army Historical Research. 17 (68): 200–204. JSTOR 44226221.
- Castex, Jean-Claude (2012). Combats franco-anglais de la Guerre de Trente Ans et de la Guerre de la Ligue d'Augsbourg. Les Éditions du Phare-Ouest. ISBN 9782921668118.
- Childs, John (1991). The Nine Years' War and the British Army 1688 97: The Operations in the Low Countries (2013 ed.). Manchester University Press. ISBN 978-0-7190-8996-1.
- Grant, RG, ed. (2011). 1001 Battles That Changed the Course of History. Universe Publishing. ISBN 978-0789322333.
- Lynn, John A. (1999). The Wars of Louis XIV: 1667–1714. Longman. ISBN 0-582-05629-2.
- Holmes, Richard (2008). Marlborough; England's Fragile Genius. Harper Press. ISBN 978-0007225712.
- Messenger, Charles (2001). Reader's Guide to Military History. Routledge. ISBN 978-1-57958-241-8.
- Moreri, Louis (1749). Le grand dictionnaire historique ou Le melange curieux de l'Histoire sacrée; Volume I (in French). Libraires Associes, Paris.
- Ripley, George; Dana, Charles A., eds. (1879). "Flag". The American Cyclopædia. Vol. 8. p. 250.
- Palliser, Mrs Bury (1911). History of Lace. Dover Publications Inc. New York, NY; reprint (originally published in 1805. Updated edition edited by M. Jourdain and Alice Dryden). ISBN 0-486-24742-2.
- Périni, Hardy (1906). Batailles françaises (5e série) (in French). Flammarion. ISBN 9782016136744.
- Straehle, A. (1853). Lexicon der Schlachten, Treffen, Gefechte, Scharmützel, Recontres, Belagerungen [et]c: an denen seit der Mitte des siebenzehnten Jahrhunderts kurbrandenburgische und königlich preussische Truppen Theil genommen (1853 ed.). G. A. van der Beeck.
- "The Vinkhuijzen collection of military uniforms: France, 1750-1757". New York Public Library. 25 March 2011 [2004]. Archived from the original on 6 April 2015.
- Van Nimwegen, Olaf (2020). De Veertigjarige Oorlog 1672-1712. Prometheus. ISBN 978-90-446-3871-4.
- Wauters, Eric; Verbrugge, Arne (2022). Les campements militaires à Ninove (1667–1748) : instruments de recherche et contexte historico-militaire, in Maxime Poulain, Marc Brion and Arne Verbrugge, The Archaeology of Conflicts: Early modern military encampments and material culture. BAR Publishing. ISBN 9781407359618.
