= Eliksem =

Coordinates: 50°47′03″N 5°00′35″E

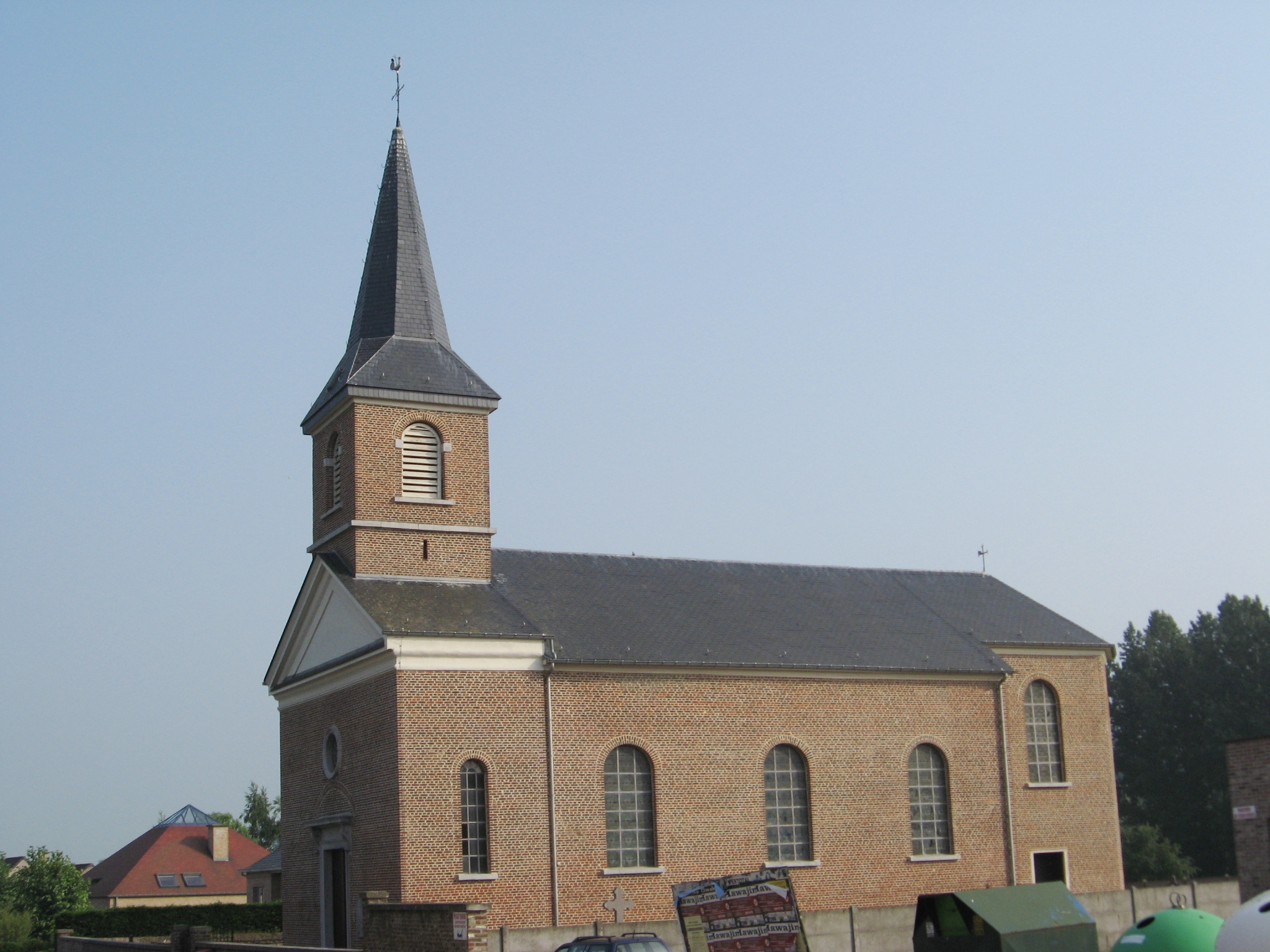
Church of Saint Martin in Eliksem, Landen, Flemish Brabant, Belgium

Eliksem is a village located in the Belgian province of Flemish Brabant. It is part of the municipality of Landen.

The village is known for the Battle of Elixheim, where the word Elixheim is an 18th-century English/French transformation of Eliksem.
