= Dutch Blue Guards =

Foot guards of the Dutch s

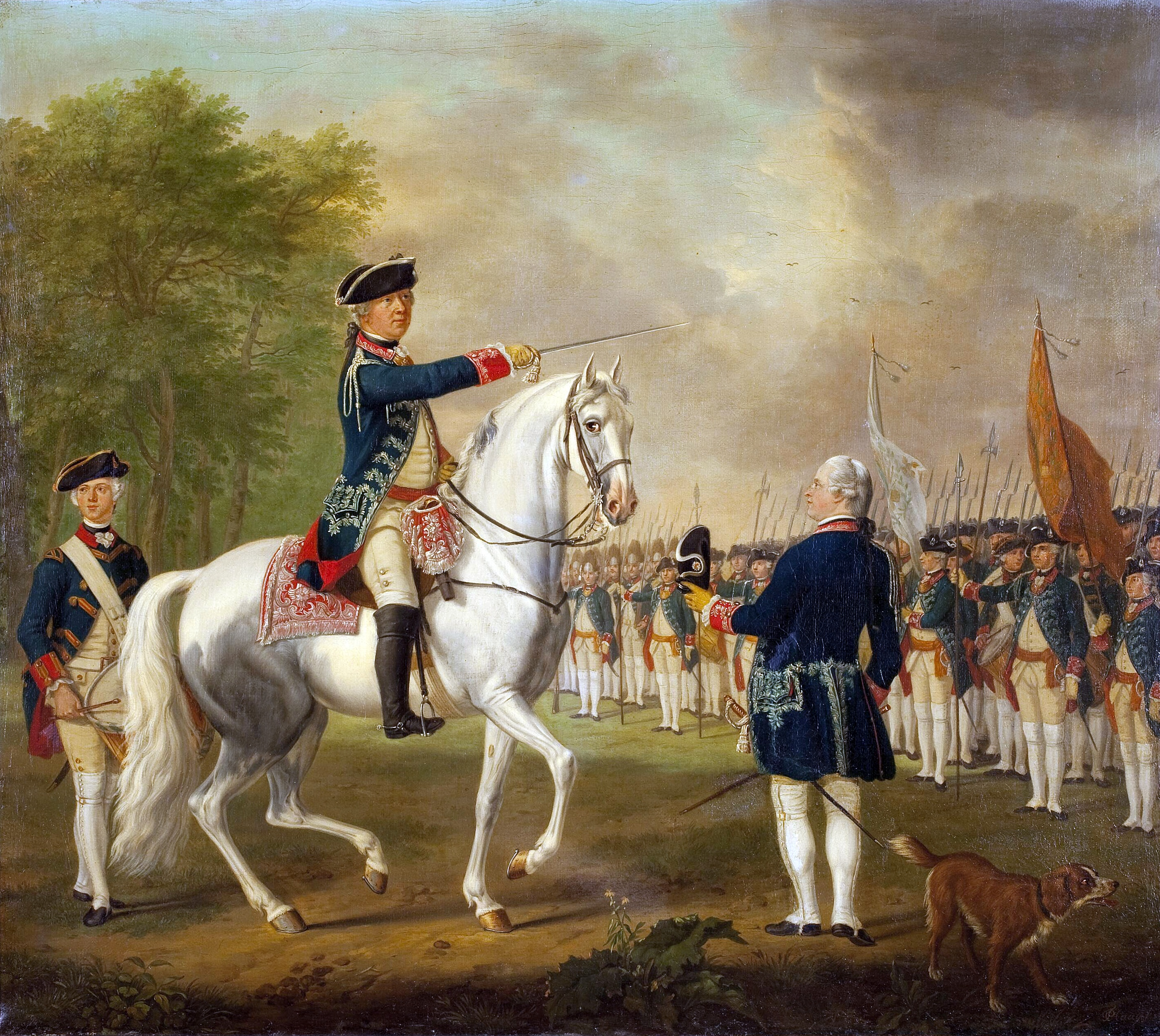
Inspection of the Dutch Guards, around 1770.

The Dutch Guards (Dutch: Hollandsche Gardes), nicknamed the Blue Guards (Dutch: Blauwe Garde) during the late 17th century, were the foot guards of the Dutch States Army. They were disbanded in 1795 when the Dutch Republic was dissolved.

== Origin ==
In 1573, a company of Foot Guards was raised. In 1599, a guard regiment, called His Highness' Guard Regiment of Foot, or the Regiment Nassau, was created. A second guard regiment, the Regiment of Foot Guards, was raised in 1643, into which the Company of Foot Guards was incorporated. When Prince Willem III became Stadtholder, the Regiment of Foot Guards lost its guard status and became a line regiment; the Company of Foot Guards was transferred to a new guard regiment raised in 1672, named His Highness' Guard Regiment of Foot. This regiment lost all its commanders in the Battle of Seneffe (August 11, 1674); the commander of the Regiment Nassau, Major General Van Solms, amalgamated both regiments into one guard regiment, the Nassau Regiment becoming the 1st battalion, and His Highness' Guard Regiment of Foot becoming the 2nd battalion.

The regiment was renamed His Majesty's Guard Regiment of Foot in 1689. From 1688 to 1699, it served as William III of Orange's Guards regiment. Under King William III, the regiment served in England as his personal guard. During this time, it was also known as the "Blue Guards", because of the Nassau blue coats with yellow/orange cuffs and lining. After Willem III died in 1702, the regiment was renamed the Dutch Guards. The uniform became dark blue with poppy red lining and cuffs; white metal buttons on the coat, and white lace loops; waistcoat and breeches became white. This uniform was worn throughout the 18th century.

In 1699, William negotiated the Treaty of London with France in coordination with the Dutch Estates General and Bentinck but refused to inform the Parliament of England. In response, they stopped funding the Dutch Guards, and he contemplated abdicating the English throne, writing to Anthonie Heinsius that:

I am so angry about what is happening in the House of Commons in the matter of the troops, that I can hardly concentrate my thoughts on anything else. I foresee that I shall have to come to extreme decisions and that I shall see you in Holland earlier than I had intended".

== Campaigns and battles ==
Notable campaigns in which the guards fought included the Nine Years' War (1688–1697) in which distinguished themselves at the Battles of the Boyne and Fleurus along with the siege of Limerick. After the death of William III in 1702, the regiment went back to the Netherlands and during the War of the Spanish Succession (1702–1712) was the backbone of the Dutch Army. In that war, the Dutch Army was the second largest in Europe. In particular, the Dutch pioneered the development of platoon fire, which allowed infantry formations to fire continuously, which gave the Dutch an advantage in firepower over armies not using the platoon fire system.

The Blue Guards of the Allied armies under the command of John Churchill, a British general, and distinguished themselves in the Battles of Malplaquet and Oudenaarde. They were not present at the Allied victory of Blenheim, but they greatly distinguished themselves at the Battle of Ramillies, under the command of Colonel Wertmüller, storming two French held villages on the Allied left. They also fought bravely and suffered heavy losses at Malplaquet, fighting under the command of the Prince of Orange on the Allied left flank.

During the War of the Austrian Succession, they took part in the campaign in Germany in 1743, the Battles of Fontenoy and Rocoux and the defence of Brussels and of Bergen op Zoom. After the war, the Republic maintained a policy of strict neutrality. The Dutch Guards came into action once again during the campaigns of 1793 and 1794 against the armies of Revolutionary France.

== Disbanding ==
After the Dutch Republic had been invaded by the French troops in 1795 and the Stadtholderate had come to an end, the Republic was reformed and became the Batavian Republic. The Dutch Guards and other guard units, as representatives of the Ancien Régime, were disbanded the same year.
