= Hugh Mackay (Scottish general) =

Scottish army officer (1640–1692)

Lieutenant-General Hugh Mackay
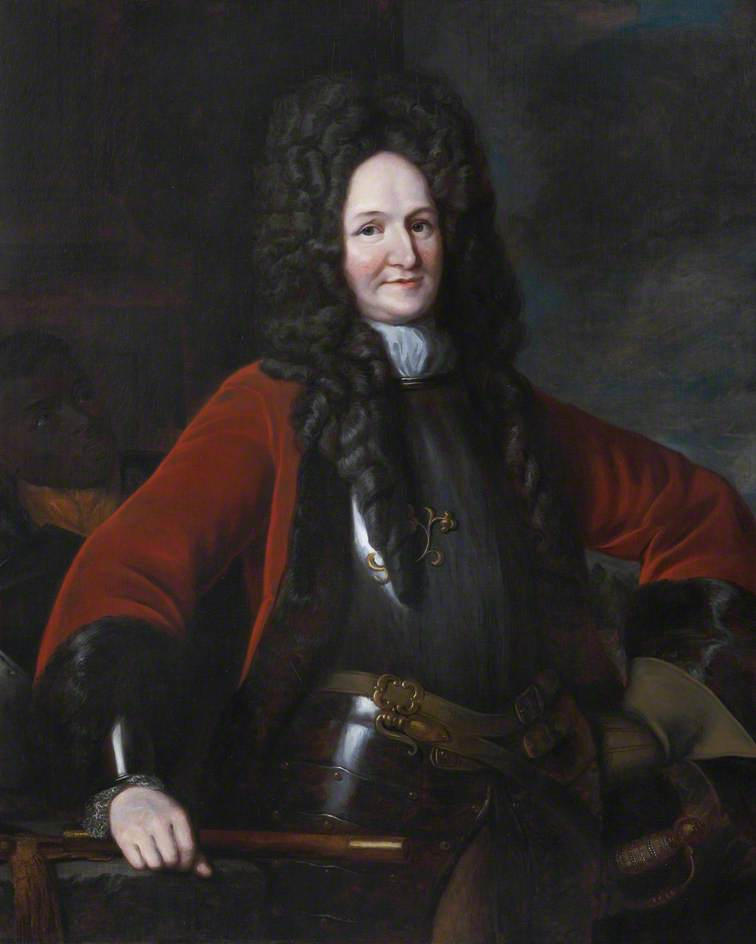
- c. 1690 portrait

Commander-in-Chief, Scottish Army
- In office January 1689 – November 1690
- Monarch: William III
- Preceded by: James Douglas
- Succeeded by: Thomas Livingstone

Personal details
- Born: 1640 Scourie, Sutherlandshire
- Died: 24 July 1692 (aged 51–52) Steenkerque, Spanish Netherlands
- Awards: Privy Council of Scotland

Military service
- Allegiance: Scotland; Venice; Dutch Republic; Williamites
- Branch/service: Scots Army; Venetian army Dutch States Army
- Years of service: 1660–1692
- Rank: Lieutenant general
- Unit: Douglas' Regiment
- Commands: Scots Brigade
- Battles/wars: Cretan War (1645–1669); Third Anglo-Dutch War; Franco-Dutch War; Battle of Seneffe; Battle of Cassel (1677); Battle of Saint-Denis (1678); Jacobite rising of 1689; Killiecrankie; Williamite War in Ireland; Battle of Aughrim; Nine Years' War; Battle of Steenkerque †

Lieutenant-General Hugh Mackay (c. 1640 – 24 July 1692) was a Scottish army officer. In 1660, Mackay was commissioned into the Scots Army's Douglas' Regiment, spending the next few years in England and France, then volunteered to serve in the Venetian army during the Cretan War. Following service in the Third Anglo-Dutch War and Franco-Dutch War, In 1673, he joined the Scots Brigade, a long established mercenary unit of the Dutch States Army. He served with the brigade for the rest of his career.

Mackay led the brigade during the Glorious Revolution and was served as the Commander-in-Chief, Scottish Army during the Jacobite rising of 1689. Despite being defeat at the Battle of Killiecrankie in July 1689, the Scottish Highlands had largely been brought under control by the end of 1690 and Mackay subsequently served in the Williamite War in Ireland. He returned to the Netherlands in October 1691 after the Treaty of Limerick and during the Nine Years' War commanded the British division serving with the Allied army, and died at the Battle of Steenkerque in 1692.

== Early life ==
Hugh Mackay was born in c. 1640, the third son of Hugh Mackay of Scourie, a junior branch of Clan Mackay, and his wife Anne. By this time, much of the family estates were mortgaged, a situation compounded by his father's support for the defeated Royalists during the 1642 to 1654 Wars of the Three Kingdoms. The last of their Scottish estates were sold in 1829.

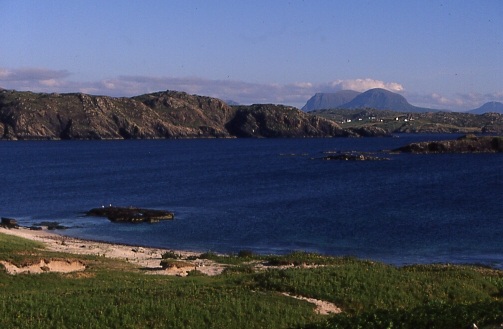
Scourie, seen across the Sound of Handa

In 1668, his elder brothers William and Hector were both murdered in separate incidents. This meant when his father died shortly after, Hugh inherited Scourie, although he never lived there. He also had two younger brothers; James was killed at Killiecrankie in 1689 and Roderick died on service in the East Indies.

In 1673, he married Clara de Bie, daughter of a rich Amsterdam merchant; they had a number of children, including Hugh (1681–1708), Margaret (1683–1748) and Maria (1686-1723?). Many of his descendants served in the Dutch military; this branch ultimately became hereditary Chiefs of Clan Mackay and continue to hold the titles of Lord Reay in the Scottish peerage and Lord of Ophemert and Zennewijnen in the Netherlands.

== Pre-1688 service ==
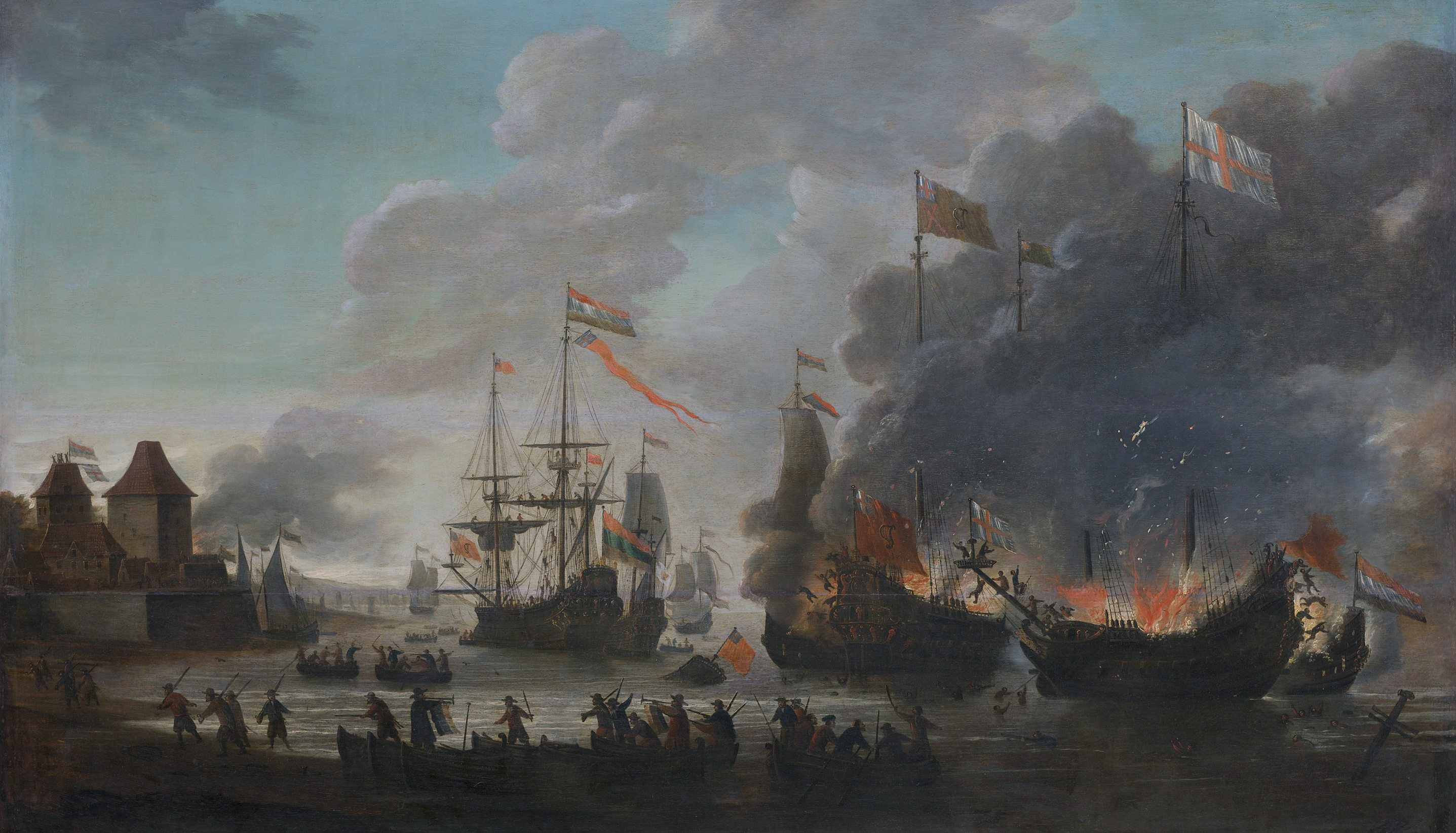
The raid on the Medway, at which Mackay's regiment was accused of looting

In 1660, Mackay was commissioned as an ensign in Douglas' Regiment, a Scots Army regiment first formed in 1619, then employed by Louis XIV of France. (Note: 17th century military customs For many English politicians in the late 17th century, standing armies were considered a danger to individual liberties and a threat to society itself. The use of troops to suppress political dissent by the Protectorate and James II created strong resistance to permanent units owing primary allegiance to the Crown or State. To prevent this, it was deliberate policy to treat regiments as the personal property of their Colonel; they changed names when transferred to another and were disbanded as soon as possible. Commissions were assets that could be bought, sold or used as an investment; one person could simultaneously hold multiple commissions and there were no age restrictions. Henry Hawley, commander of government forces at the Battle of Falkirk Muir in 1746 obtained his first commission when he was only nine years old. Holding a commission did not require actual service and at senior levels in particular, ownership and command were separate functions. Many colonels or lieutenant colonels played active military roles as staff or regimental officers but others remained civilians who delegated their duties to a subordinate. States commonly employed units composed of other nationalities, such as the French Royal Army's Irish Brigade or the Dutch States Army's Scots Brigade; in the French army of 1672, 12 out of 58 infantry battalions were recruited outside France, as were 9 of its 87 cavalry regiments. Loyalties were often based on religious belief or personal relationships rather than nationality, with officers moving between armies or changing sides. These professionals formed a small and tight-knit group; during the 1689-1692 campaign in Scotland, former Scots Brigade colleagues included Mackay's opponents Alexander Cannon, Thomas Buchan and Viscount Dundee, as well as his subordinate, Sir Thomas Livingstone.) After the 1660 Restoration, it served as body guard to Charles II, before resuming French service in 1662. During the 1665 to 1667 Second Anglo-Dutch War, it was based at Chatham Dockyard but accused of looting after the 1667 Medway Raid and ordered back to France.

In 1669, Mackay volunteered for the Venetian forces fighting in siege of Candia; he rejoined the regiment and took part in the 1672 invasion of the Dutch Republic. Many Scots and English officers opposed supporting an attack by Catholic France against Dutch fellow Protestants. After his marriage in 1673, Mackay transferred to the Anglo-Scots Brigade, part of the Dutch military; he took part in the 1674 Battle of Seneffe and siege of Grave.

First formed in the 1570s, the Brigade normally consisted of three Scots and three English regiments, but by 1674, it had lost much of its national character. When William of Orange complained about its low morale, Mackay suggested recruiting as much as possible from England and Scotland. This revitalised the Brigade; Mackay's Regiment was largely composed of his own family or clan members.

Units like the Scots Brigade or Tangier Garrison were an important source of professional soldiers, who could be used to expand the English army when needed. Although Charles II and his brother James formally controlled officer appointments, many were political and religious exiles, particularly after the 1679–81 Exclusion Crisis. When Charles tried to appoint the Catholic Earl of Dumbarton as Brigade commander, William refused.

In 1685, William sent the Brigade to England to help James suppress the Monmouth Rebellion, with Mackay as 'temporary' commander. He returned to the Netherlands in August without seeing action, although James appointed him as a Privy Councillor of Scotland in an attempt to gain his loyalty. In early 1688, James demanded the repatriation of the entire Brigade; William refused to comply but used the opportunity to remove officers viewed as unreliable.

== Scotland and Ireland, 1688 to 1691 ==
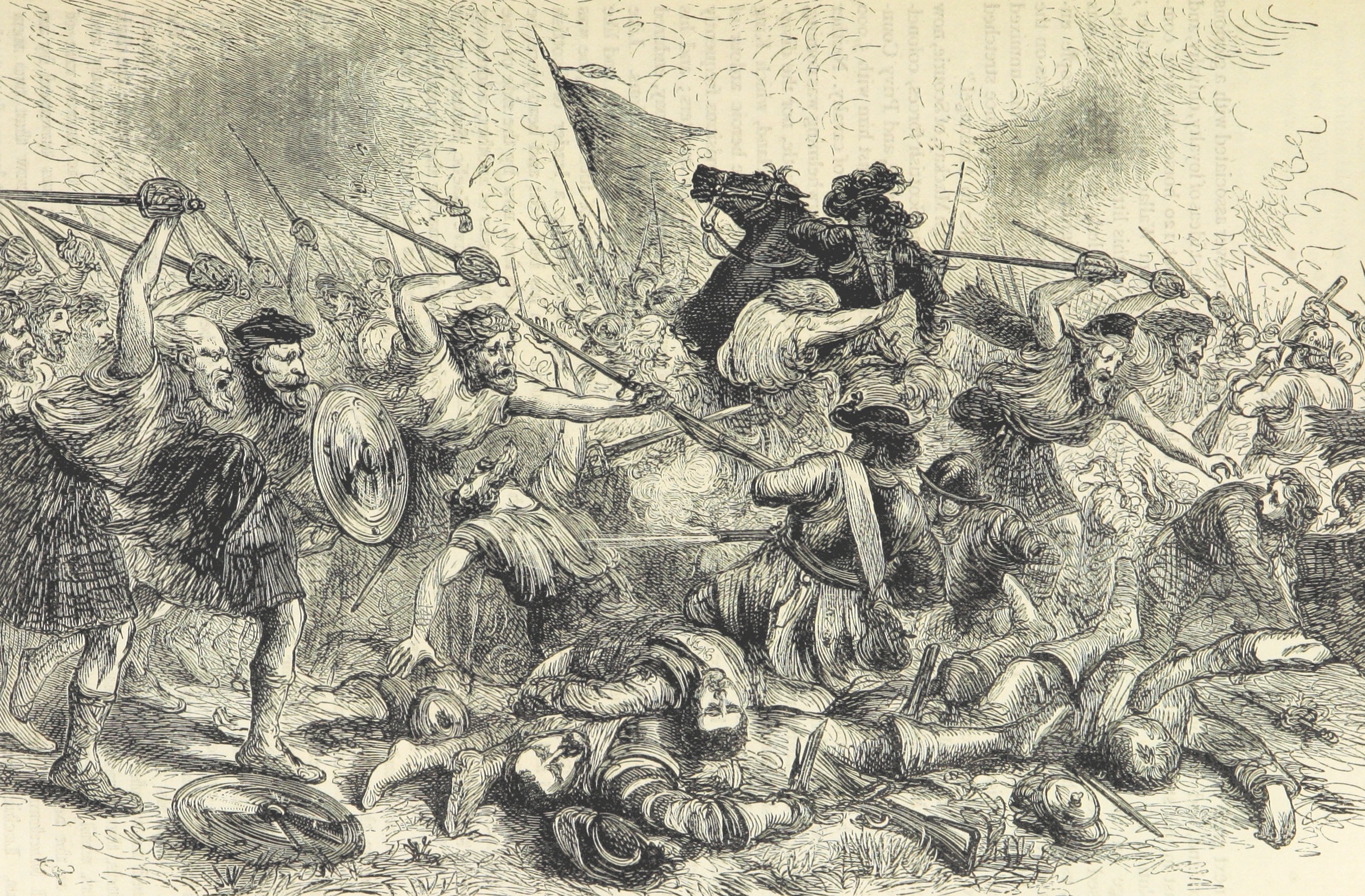
The Battle of Killiecrankie, at which Mackay was defeated

When William landed in Torbay on 5 November 1688, the Brigade formed part of the invasion force; a small detachment was engaged in the Wincanton Skirmish on 20 November 1688, one of the few actions of a largely bloodless campaign. On 4 January 1689, Mackay was appointed commander in Scotland; he was delayed by illness, arriving in Leith on 25 March 1689. His original mission was to protect the Scottish Convention in Edinburgh; but on 12 March James landed in Ireland and John Graham, Viscount Dundee launched a rising in Scotland in his support.

Mackay had 1,100 men from the Scottish regiments in Dutch service; recruits increased his numbers to over 3,500 but many were only partially trained. On 16 May, Dundee reached Glen Roy, where he was joined by 1,800 Highlanders recruited by Ewen Cameron of Lochiel. After failing to tempt Mackay into an ambush, Dundee returned to Glenroy on 11 June. Before doing so, he installed a Jacobite garrison at Blair Castle, a strategic point controlling access to the Lowlands and home to the Duke of Atholl. In an example of how many balanced the competing sides, Atholl left Edinburgh for Bath in England, claiming ill-health. Meanwhile, his eldest son John Murray 'besieged' his ancestral home, the garrison commander being Patrick Stewart of Ballechin, a trusted Atholl family retainer.

When Jacobite reinforcements under Sir Alexander Maclean arrived at Blair on 25 July, Murray withdrew. Mackay left Perth with around 3,500 men and moved north to his support, entering the Pass of Killiecrankie on the morning of 27th. Finding Dundee's forces positioned on the lower slopes of Creag Eallich to the north, he faced his troops uphill, their line only three men deep to maximise firepower. The Jacobites began their assault shortly after sunset at eight pm; volleys from Mackay's left flank killed nearly 600 but the effectiveness of their fire was masked by a shallow terrace, while the right flank fled without firing a shot. Highlander tactics consisted of firing a single volley at close range, then using axes and swords in hand-to-hand fighting.

Killiecrankie is the first recorded use of the plug bayonet by British troops in battle; this increased firepower by eliminating the need for pikemen but required training and confidence in its use. The bayonet fitted into the barrel of the musket (hence 'plug'), preventing further reloading or firing and so fixing them was delayed until the last possible moment. Inexperience and the speed of the Jacobite charge meant Mackay's troops were effectively defenceless and the battle lasted under 30 minutes.

Mackay and a small cavalry escort charged through the Highlanders, ending up on the high ground above. An orderly retreat turned into a rout as the army disintegrated; he lost nearly 2,000 men, including his younger brother James, who was killed, while his nephew Robert was seriously wounded. However, Dundee was shot dead in the final moments, while the Jacobites stopped to loot the baggage train, allowing Mackay and 500 survivors to reach the safety of Stirling Castle. Despite this defeat, Mackay quickly assembled a new force of around 3,000 cavalry, and refused to panic. The Jacobites lacked the equipment to capture a port, making resupply almost impossible, while lack of cavalry made them vulnerable in the open. Keeping Highland troops in the field for long periods was a challenge even for experienced commanders like Dundee; this meant time was on Mackay's side, so long as he avoided another ambush.

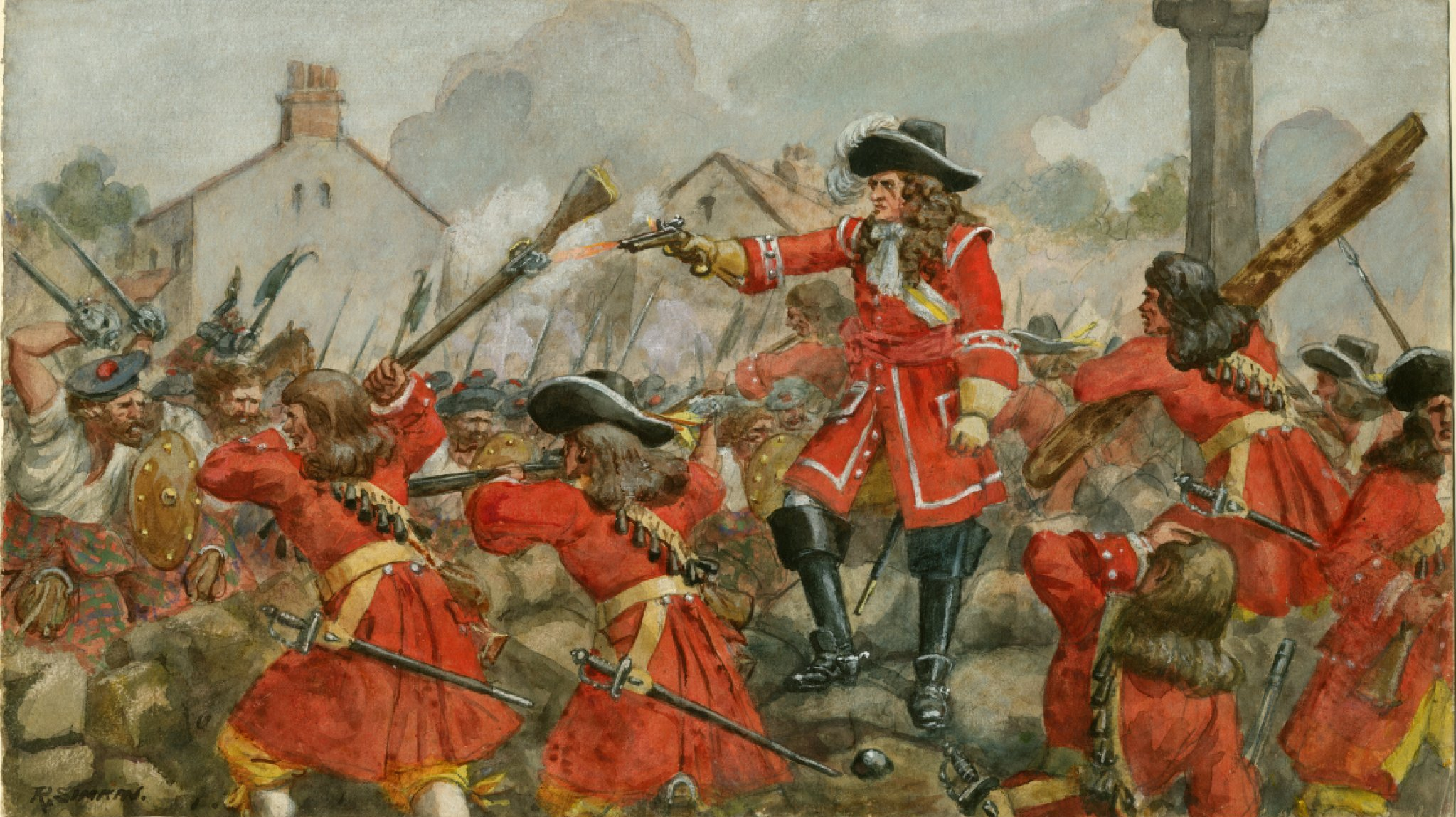
The Battle of Dunkeld

Alexander Cannon replaced Dundee, but his options were limited and his campaign ended after an assault on Dunkeld in August was repulsed with heavy losses. Mackay spent the winter reducing Jacobite strongholds and constructing a new base at Fort William, while harsh weather conditions led to severe food shortages. Thomas Buchan replaced Cannon in February 1690, but could only mobilise some 800 men; he was taken by surprise at Cromdale in May and his forces scattered. Mackay pursued him into Aberdeenshire, preventing him from establishing a secure base and in November, he relinquished command to Livingstone.

Louis XIV viewed the campaign in Ireland as a low-cost way of diverting William's resources from Flanders. Despite their defeat at the Battle of the Boyne in 1690, French general Marquis de St Ruth landed at Limerick in February 1691 to launch a new campaign. Mackay was sent to Ireland as second in command to General Ginkell; at the Battle of Aughrim on 12 July, he directed his infantry in a series of bloody frontal assaults on the Jacobite positions on Kilcommadan Hill. When the Irish infantry finally ran out of ammunition, a fourth attempt by Mackay turned their flank and the Jacobite army collapsed when St Ruth was killed. The war ended with the Treaty of Limerick in October 1691.

== Flanders 1692 ==
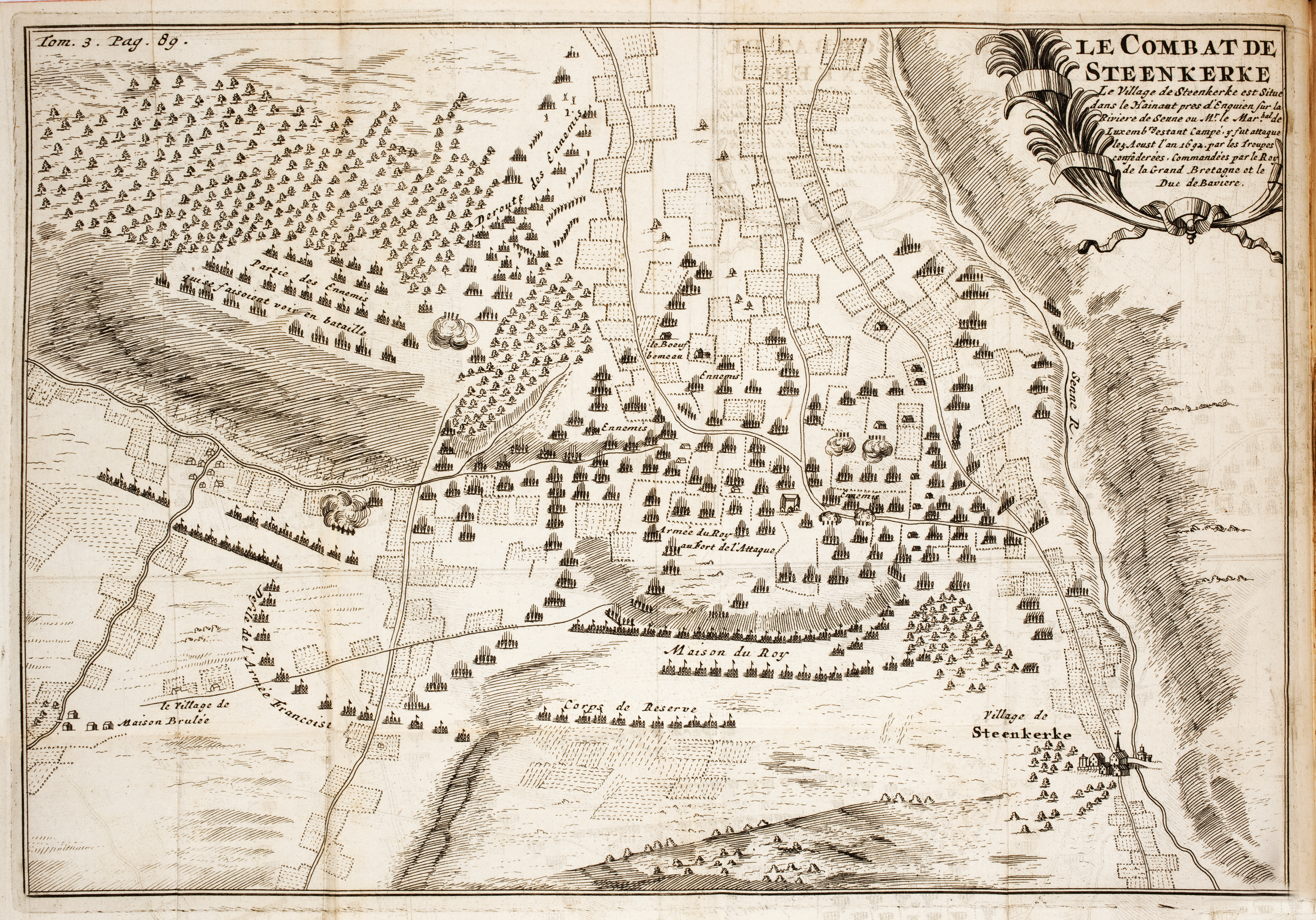
Map of the Battle of Steinkirk

The Treaty of Limerick on 3 October 1691 ended the war in Ireland; Mackay returned to the Netherlands and was made commander of the British division of the Allied army for the 1692 campaign in Flanders. After the French captured Namur in June 1692, their commander the Duc de Luxembourg established a defensive position he assumed was too strong to attack. However, at the Battle of Steinkirk on 24 July William launched an assault led by Mackay's division; with the element of surprise, they captured the first three lines of trenches and came very close to achieving a stunning victory, but the French quickly recovered.

Confusion and the poor state of the roads prevented William from reinforcing his frontline, which meant fewer than 15,000 of the 80,000 Grand Army were engaged at any point during the battle. With his troops spread out over the fortifications and under huge pressure from the French, Mackay asked William for permission to withdraw and reorganise. Ordered to continue the assault, he allegedly said 'The Lord's will be done' and taking his place at the head of his regiment was killed with many of his division. Over 8,000 of the 15,000 Allied troops engaged became casualties, with five British regiments almost wiped out.

== Assessment ==
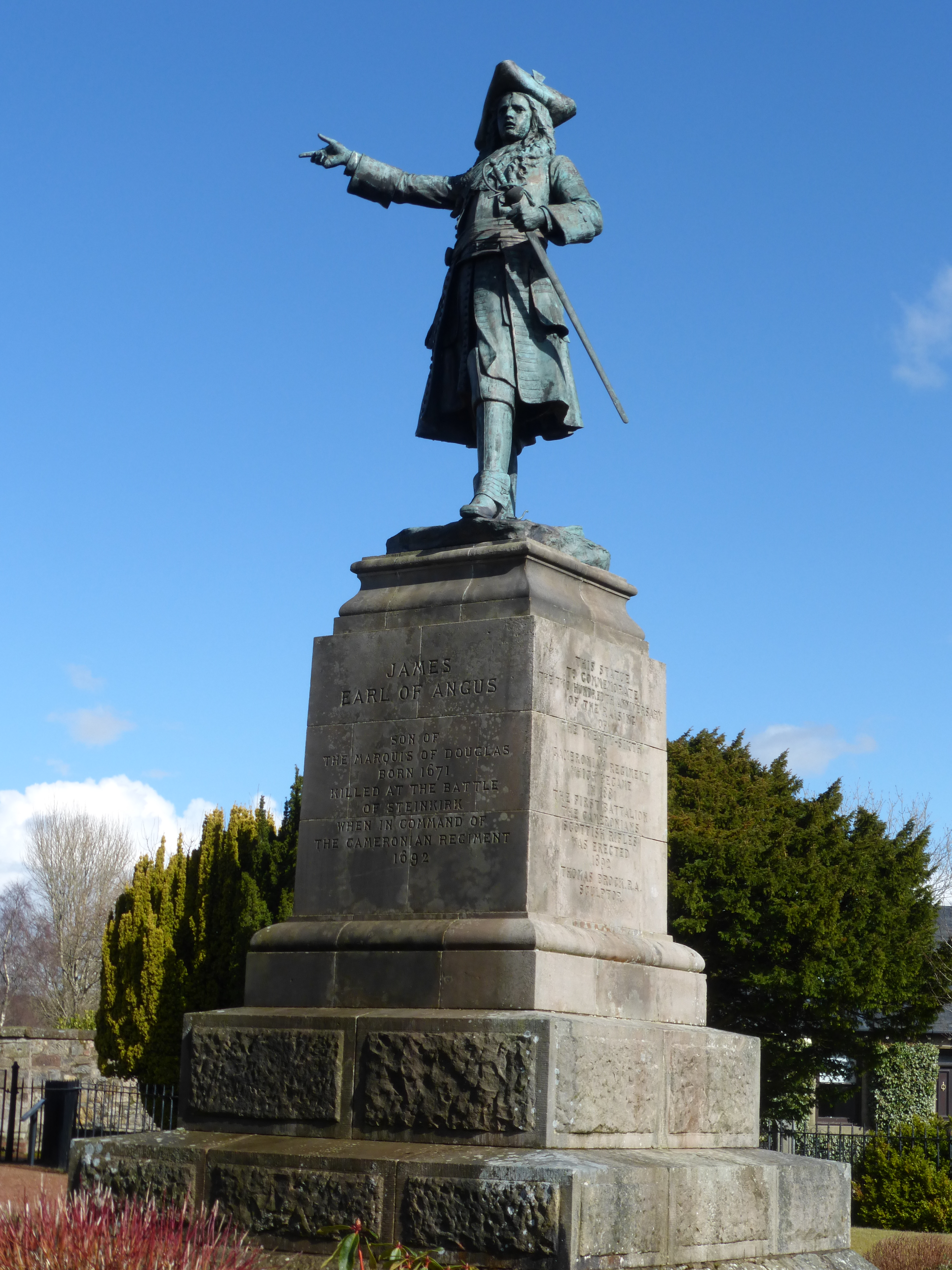
Statue of James Douglas, Earl of Angus (1671-1692), killed at Steinkirk with Mackay

Mackay's assessment by Victorian biographers was largely a function of defeat at Killiecrankie and a tendency to overstate the abilities of Dundee in comparison to his contemporaries. Warfare in this period emphasised the defence and assault of fortified places, avoiding battle unless on extremely favourable terms and denying opportunities to opponents. Based on these criteria, Mackay was a competent and reliable commander who kept his head under pressure. At Killiecrankie, he may have been better advised to withdraw, but the result would have been very different if his right wing had not fled without firing a shot.

Mackay recognised defeat did not change the strategic position and focused on denying the Jacobites access to a port or forcing them to fight on unfavourable terms. He succeeded in both these aims; the Jacobites suffered disproportionate casualties at Dunkeld because they had been left no useful objective while he kept up the pressure through the winter of 1689/90. Close coordination with Livingstone led to victory at Cromdale in May 1690 and his subsequent pursuit prevented Buchan reigniting the Rising. Logistics and communication were considerably more complex in the late 17th century and were key skills of the Duke of Marlborough, a contemporary and much better known military figure.

Mackay was a far less effective battlefield commander; in addition to Killiecrankie, his repeated and bloody frontal assaults at Steinkirk and Aughrim show a lack of imagination. In summary, he was a reliable divisional commander who could be trusted to carry out his instructions but not a leader of armies. William allegedly observed; 'He had one very singular quality; in councils of war he delivered his opinion freely, and maintained it with due zeal, but how positive soever he was in it, if the council of war overruled, even though he was not convinced by it, yet to all others he justified it, and executed his part with the same zeal as if his own opinion had prevailed.'

== Other ==
Mackay was the author of Rules of War for the Infantry, ordered to be observed by their Majesties, Subjects encountering with the Enemy upon the day of Battell, written by Lieutenant-General Mackay, and Recommended to All (as well officers as soldiers) of the Scots and English army. In xxiii articles. Published by his Excellencies Secretary. Reprinted at Edinburgh by John Reid in 1693.

Many family members served in the Scots Brigade, including his two younger brothers, his nephews Aeneas and Robert and his eldest son. Mackays were still with the Brigade when it was finally dissolved in 1782.

Mackay blamed his defeat at Killiecrankie on the failure of his troops to fit the plug bayonet in time to stop the rush of the Highlanders, and suggested it be replaced with the ring or socket bayonet. The concept was first demonstrated in 1678 but rejected since the bayonet had a tendency to fall off; sources vary but Mackay either designed or suggested the adoption of a ring system for attaching it to the musket.

== Sources ==
- Anonymous (1795). An Historical Account of the British Regiments Employed Since the Reign of Queen Elizabeth and King James I in the Formation and Defence of the Dutch Republic Particularly of the Scotch Brigade (2009 ed.). T. Kay. ASIN B002IYDVB6.
- Atkinson, CT (1938). "The British Losses at Steinkirk 1692". Journal of the Society for Army Historical Research. 17 (68): 200–204. JSTOR 44226221.
- Bangor Jones, Malcolm (2000). "From Clanship to Crafting: Landownership, Economy and the Church in the Province of Strathnaver". Northern Studies. The Province of Strathnaver.
- Chandler, David; Beckett, Ian (1996). The Oxford History of the British Army (2002 ed.). Oxford University Press. ISBN 978-0-19-280311-5.
- Chichester, HM (2004). "Thomas Livingstone, Viscount Teviot". Oxford Dictionary of National Biography (online ed.). Oxford University Press. doi:10.1093/ref:odnb/16810. (Subscription, Wikipedia Library access or UK public library membership required.)
- Childs, John (1984a). "The Scottish brigade in the service of the Dutch Republic, 1689 to 1782". Documentatieblad Werkgroep Achttiende Eeuw.
- Childs, John (1987). The British Army of William III, 1689-1702 (1990 ed.). Manchester University Press. ISBN 978-0719025525.
- Childs, John (1984b). "The British Brigade in France 1672-1678". History. 69 (227): 384–397. doi:10.1111/j.1468-229X.1984.tb01427.x. JSTOR 24419689.
- Childs, John (1991). The Nine Years' War and the British Army 1688 97: The Operations in the Low Countries (2013 ed.). Manchester University Press. ISBN 978-0-7190-8996-1.
- Glozier, Mathew (2004). Scottish Soldiers in France in the Reign of the Sun King: Nursery for Men of Honour. Brill. ISBN 978-9004138650.
- Guy, Alan (1985). Economy and Discipline: Officership and the British Army, 1714–63. Manchester University Press. ISBN 978-0-7190-1099-6.
- Hill, James (1986). Celtic Warfare 1595–1763 (2017 ed.). Dalriada Publishers. ISBN 978-0-9708525-5-7.
- Holmes, Richard (2008). Marlborough; Flawed Genius. Harper Press. ISBN 978-0-00-722571-2.
- Kennedy, Allan (2016). "Rebellion, Government and the Scottish Response to Argyll's Rising of 1685" (PDF). Journal of Scottish Historical Studies. 36 (1): 40–59. doi:10.3366/jshs.2016.0167.
- Lenman, Bruce (1995). The Jacobite Risings in Britain, 1689–1746. Scottish Cultural Press. ISBN 978-1-898218-20-3.
- Mackay, John (1836). The Life of Lieutenant-General Hugh MacKay (1991 ed.). Kessinger Publishing. ISBN 978-1166595692.
- Macpherson, James (1775). Original Papers: Containing the Secret History of Great Britain (2017 ed.). Hansebooks. ISBN 978-3-7434-3572-8.
- Messenger, Charles (2001). Reader's Guide to Military History. Routledge. ISBN 978-1-57958-241-8.
- Miggelbrink, Joachim (2002). McKilliop, Andrew; Murdoch, Steve (eds.). Fighting for Identity: Scottish Military Experiences c.1550-1900. Brill. ISBN 978-9004128231.
- Moody, T.; Martin, F.; Byrne, F. (2009). Early Modern Ireland 1534–1691 V3. OUP. ISBN 978-0-19-956252-7.
- Norris, John (2015). Fix Bayonets!. Pen and Sword. ISBN 978-1-78159-336-3.
- Oliver, Neil; Pollard, Tony (2003). Two Men in a Trench II: Uncovering the Secrets of British Battlefields (2015 ed.). Penguin. ISBN 978-0-14-101212-4.
- Wauchope, Piers (2004). "Hugh Mackay". Oxford Dictionary of National Biography (2006 ed.). Oxford University Press. doi:10.1093/ref:odnb/17557. (Subscription, Wikipedia Library access or UK public library membership required.)

Military offices
Preceded by James Douglas	Commander-in-Chief, Scotland; January 1689–November 1690	Succeeded by Sir Thomas Livingstone
Preceded by Henry Graham	Colonel of the First Scottish Regiment, Dutch Scots Brigade; 1677–1692	Succeeded by Aeneas Mackay
