= Thomas Livingstone, 1st Viscount Teviot =

Dutch-born army officer

Lieutenant-General The Right Honourable The Viscount Teviot
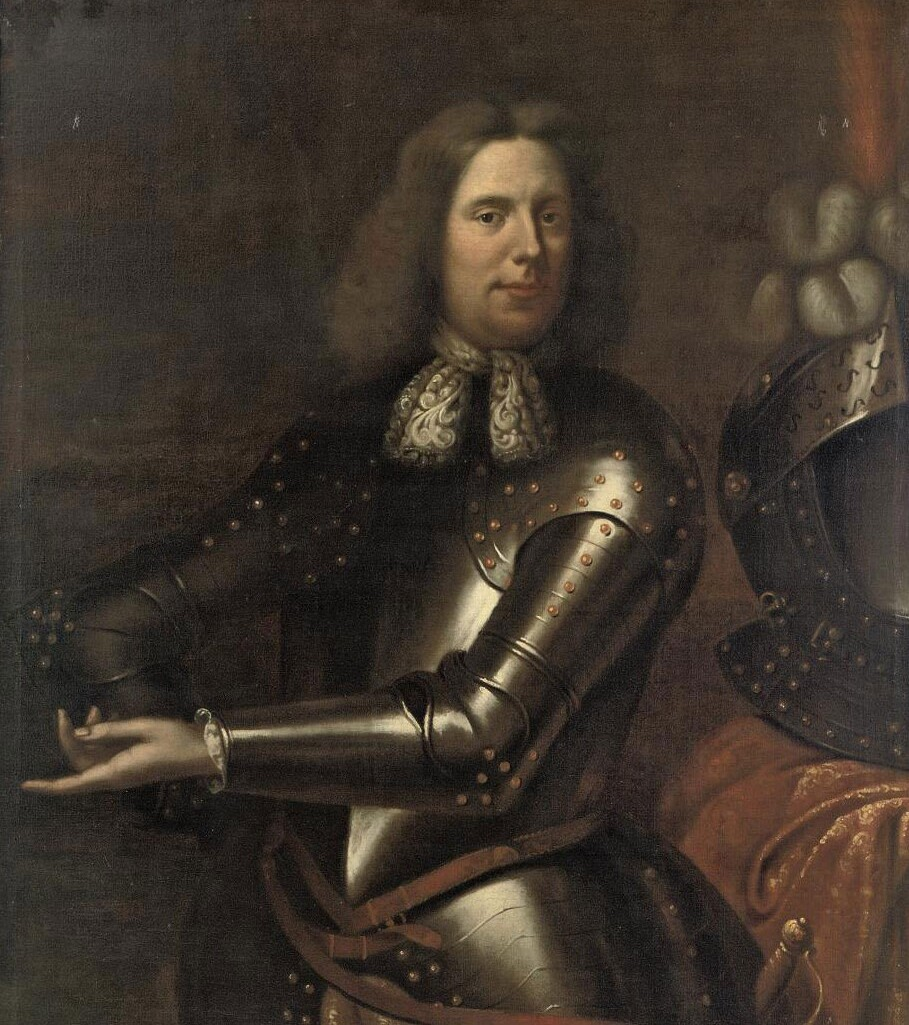
- Portrait of Teviot

Commander-in-Chief, Scottish Army
- In office 1690–1696
- Monarch: William III
- Preceded by: Hugh Mackay
- Succeeded by: George Ramsay (as Commander-in-Chief, Scotland)

Personal details
- Born: 1651 Dutch Republic
- Died: 14 January 1711 (aged 59–60) London England
- Resting place: Westminster Abbey

Military service
- Years of service: 1668–1704
- Rank: Lieutenant general
- Unit: Royal Scots Greys
- Battles/wars: Franco-Dutch War; Battle of Cassel (1677) (WIA); Battle of Saint-Denis (1678); Jacobite rising of 1689; Battle of Cromdale

Lieutenant-General Thomas Livingstone, 1st Viscount Teviot (c. 1651 – 14 January 1711) was a Dutch-born army officer who spent his career in the service of William of Orange. Following the 1688 Glorious Revolution, he served as deputy to Hugh Mackay during the Jacobite rising of 1689 in Scotland. He later succeeded Mackay in November 1690 as Commander-in-Chief, Scottish Army, a position he retained until 1696, shortly before the end of the Nine Years' War in 1697. Promoted to lieutenant general in 1703, he retired from military service in 1704 and died in London on 14 January 1711.

== Biography ==
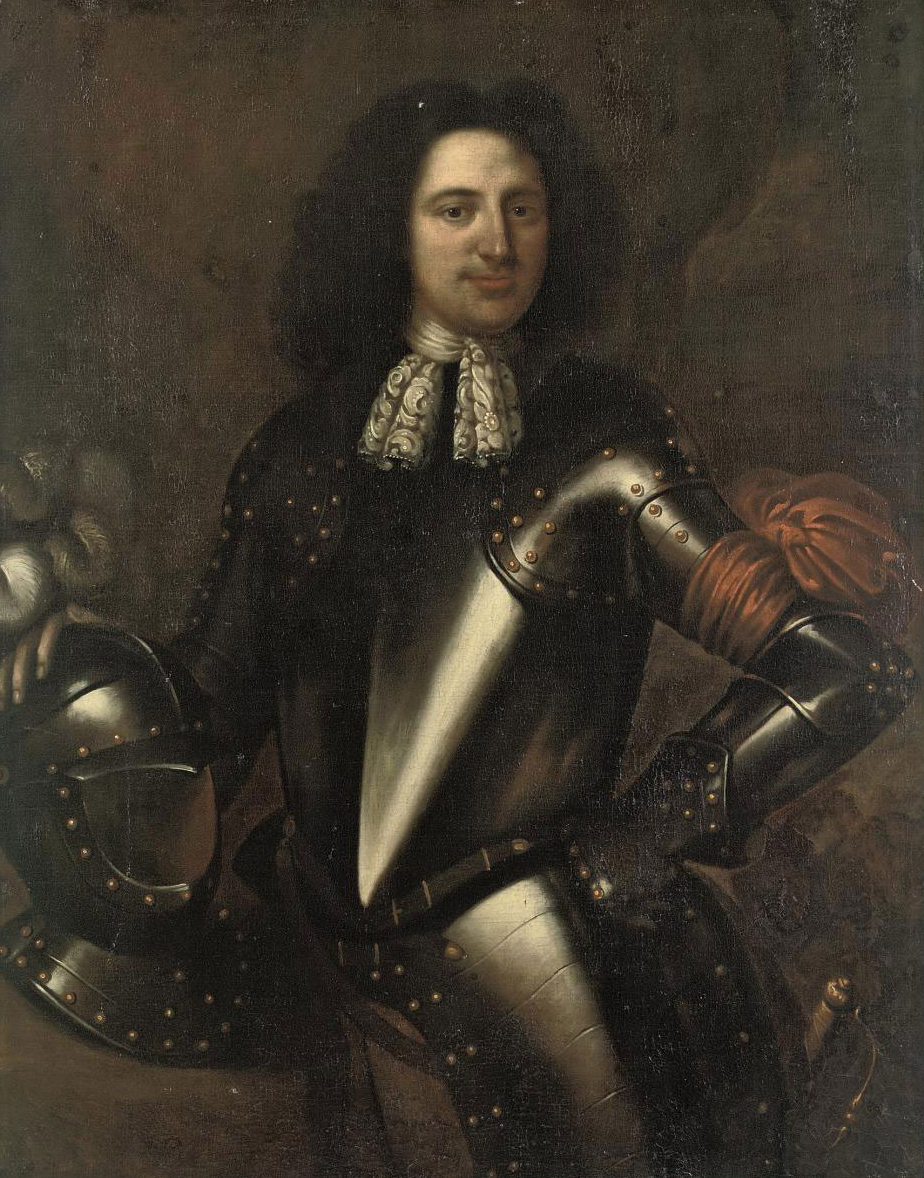
Livingstone's younger brother Alexander

Thomas Livingstone was born in the Dutch Republic in 1651; his father, also Sir Thomas Livingstone (died July 1673), came from Newbigging, South Lanarkshire. In 1635, he joined the Scots Brigade, a mercenary formation in Dutch service, and married Gertrat Edmond, daughter of another expatriate Scot; they had two sons, Thomas (1651–1711) and Alexander (1657–1718).

Livingstone married Macktellina Walrave de Nimmeguen (died 1729); they had no children and were living apart by 1703 when she successfully sued him for alimony. Their relationship was not a happy one; Livingstone accused her of poisoning him but she was acquitted. He died in London in 1711, leaving the bulk of his estate to his younger brother Alexander, who also inherited the baronetcy; the title Viscount Teviot became extinct on his death.

== Career ==
The experience of the Wars of the Three Kingdoms meant strong opposition to standing armies in Scotland and England, forcing those who wanted a military career to serve in foreign armies. These formed a small and tight-knit group of professionals; during the Jacobite rising of 1689, Livingstone, his commander Hugh Mackay, and opponents Alexander Cannon, Thomas Buchan and Viscount Dundee, had all served together in the Scots Brigade.

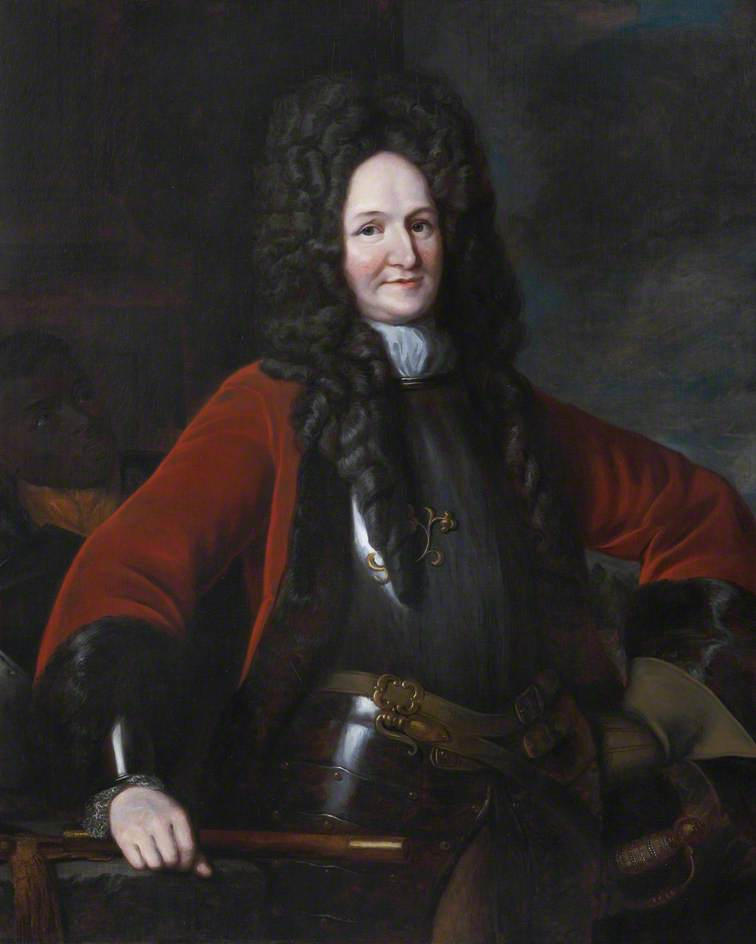
Hugh Mackay (1640–1692), Commander in Scotland 1689-1690 and a long-time colleague in the Scots Brigade

Livingstone, his father and brother Alexander were officers in Balfour's, one of three Scottish regiments in the Brigade; when the elder Thomas died in 1673, he inherited his commission and baronetcy. The Brigade fought throughout the 1672-1678 Franco-Dutch War, including Cassel in 1677, where Thomas was wounded, and Saint-Denis in 1678, just before the war ended.

Livingstone was appointed Lieutenant-Colonel of Balfour's in 1684, and accompanied William III when he invaded England in the November 1688 Glorious Revolution. James II went into exile after his army deserted, and Livingstone replaced Lord Charles Murray as Colonel of one of its dragoon regiments; the Lieutenant-Colonel was his relative William Livingstone, later exiled for his part in the 1715 rising.

Livingstone joined Mackay in Scotland in April 1689 during the 1689 Jacobite Rising; as cavalry, they were employed securing the roads between Inverness and Stirling and so missed the Jacobite victory at Killiecrankie in July. Despite this setback, Mackay and Livingstone gradually gained control; in 1690, they led separate forces in a co-ordinated campaign that ended in Livingstone's victory at the Battle of Cromdale in May. They apparently wrote to each other in Dutch, presumably a precaution against interception by the Jacobites.

Livingstone took over from Mackay as commander in Scotland on 10 November 1690, and was appointed to the Privy Council of Scotland. He spent the next 18 months reducing Jacobite strongholds and asserting control of the Scottish Highlands; the last of these actions was the Massacre of Glencoe in February 1692. Although the nature of the action was widely condemned, there was limited sympathy for the Glencoe MacDonalds; in a letter to Lord Hamilton, Livingstone commented; 'It's not that anyone thinks the thieving tribe did not deserve to be destroyed, but that it should have been done by those quartered amongst them makes a great noise.'

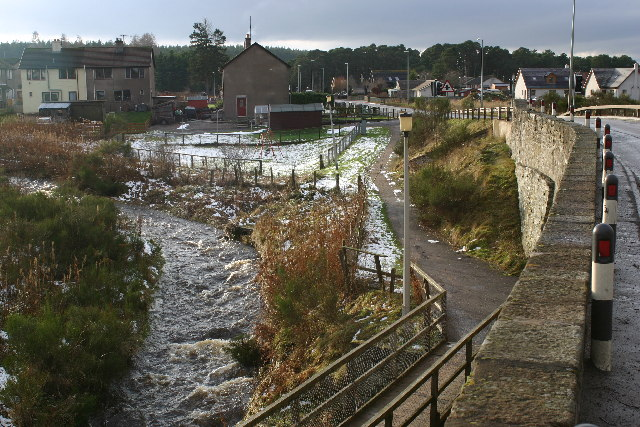
Modern Cromdale, scene of Livingstone's victory over a Jacobite force in May 1690

The 1693 Commission set up to investigate the massacre focused on whether orders had been exceeded, rather than their legality and Livingstone was cleared in their report of 10 July 1695. Livingstone remained in Scotland for most of the 1688-1697 Nine Years' War; in 1691, a group of Jacobite prisoners on Bass Rock overpowered their guards and were only subdued in 1694, while a Scottish rising was part of the proposed invasion of England in 1692. However, by 1696, it was clear the war was coming to an end, James allegedly telling his confessor 'God does not want to restore me.'

In December, Livingstone was made Viscount Teviot and Lord Livingstone of Peebles; 'Peebles' was already claimed and he later changed it to 'Hyndford' as a result. He was promoted Major General and took over a Brigade in the Netherlands, shortly before the Treaty of Ryswick in 1697. While automatically promoted Lieutenant-General in 1703, this marked the end of his active service; he played no part in the War of the Spanish Succession, selling his colonelcy to Lord John Hay in 1704.

The sale may have been to pay alimony to his estranged wife; although he had purchased lands in East Lothian, these were also sold, and Livingstone spent most of his retirement in Wimbledon, then a suburb of London. He died there on 14 January 1711, and was buried in Westminster Abbey, his brother Alexander paying for an elaborate memorial which can still be seen.

He published an account of Cromdale in May 1690, and a drill guide titled Exercise of the Foot, with the evolution according to the words of command etc etc;.

== Sources ==
- Almack, Edward (1908). The History of the Second Dragoons Royal Scots Greys. Kessinger Publishing. ISBN 978-1120890207.
- Brown, KM. "Address by the parliament to the king touching the murder of the Glencoe-men". The Records of the Parliaments of Scotland to 1707.
- Brown, Mungo, ed. (1826). Supplement to the Dictionary of the decisions of the Court of Session, Volume 4. Arkose Press. ISBN 978-1343609839.
- Chichester, HM (2004). "Thomas Livingstone, Viscount Teviot". Oxford Dictionary of National Biography (online ed.). Oxford University Press. doi:10.1093/ref:odnb/16810. (Subscription, Wikipedia Library access or UK public library membership required.)
- Childs, John (1987). The British Army of William III, 1689-1702. Manchester University Press. ISBN 978-0719025525.
- Ede-Borrett, Stephen (2011). "Casualties in the Anglo-Dutch Brigade at St Denis, 1678". Journal of the Society for Army Historical Research. 81 (237).
- Joby, Christopher. "Dutch in the Scottish Highlands". History of Dutch.
- Lynn, John A. (1999). The Wars of Louis XIV, 1667–1714. Addison Wesley Longman. ISBN 978-0582056299.
- Mackay, John (1836). Life of Lieut-Gen. Hugh Mackay of Scoury: Commander-in-Chief of the Forces in Scotland, 1689 and 1690. Forgotten Books. ISBN 978-1333263539.
- Mann, Alistair (2014). James VII: Duke and King of Scots. 1800: John Donald Short Run Press. ISBN 978-1904607908.
- Paul, Sir James Balfour (1911). The Scots Peerage; Containing an Historical and Genealogical Account of the Nobility of that Kingdom. David Douglas.
- Preeble, John (1973). Glencoe: The Story of the Massacre. Penguin. ISBN 978-0140028973.
- Westminster Abbey. "Thomas Livingstone, Viscount Teviot". Westminster Abbey.

Military offices
Preceded by Lord Charles Murray	Colonel of the Royal Scots Greys; 1689–1704	Succeeded by Lord John Hay
Preceded by Hugh Mackay	Commander-in-Chief, Scotland; November 1690–1696	Succeeded by ????
