= Scots Brigade =

16th-18th century military unit of the Dutch Republic

Scots Brigade aka Anglo-Dutch Brigade aka Anglo-Scots Brigade
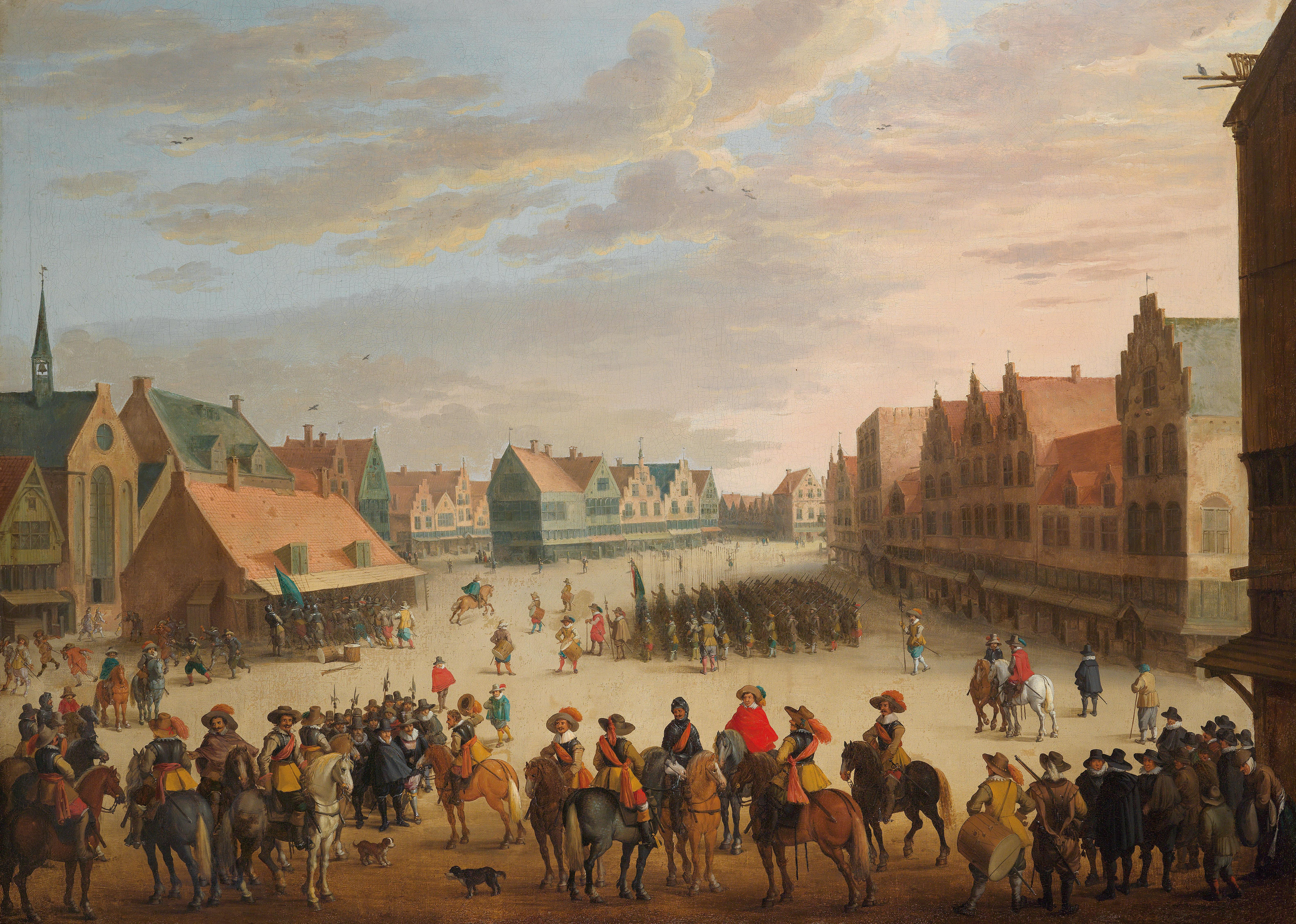
- Scots mercenaries in Utrecht, 1618
- Active: ca 1586–1782
- Country: Dutch Republic
- Branch: Army
- Type: Infantry
- Size: Brigade; between three and six regiments
- Garrison/HQ: Dutch Barrier forts
- March: The "Scottish March"
- Engagements: Eighty Years' War; Haarlem; Alkmaar; Leiden; Gembloux; Rijmenam; Antwerp; 1st Bergen op Zoom; Turnhout; Nieuwpoort; Ostend; 2nd Bergen op Zoom; 's-Hertogenbosch; 1st Maastricht; Breda; Kallo; Franco-Dutch War; Battle of Seneffe; 2nd Maastricht; Saint-Denis; Nine Years' War; England; Killiecrankie; Steenkerque; Landen; Namur; War of the Spanish Succession; Ekeren; Ramillies; Oudenarde; Lille; Malplaquet; War of the Austrian Succession; Tournai; Fontenoy; Rocoux; Lauffeld; 3rd Bergen op Zoom

Commanders
- Notable commanders: Earl of Leicester; Francis Vere; Lt-General Hugh Mackay; Colonel General Henry Balfour

The Scots Brigade, also referred to as the Anglo-Dutch Brigade or the Anglo-Scots Brigade, was an infantry brigade of the Dutch States Army. First formed in 1586, by the late 17th century it usually comprised six infantry regiments, three recruited primarily from Scotland and three from England. It was finally dissolved in 1782 following the outbreak of the Fourth Anglo-Dutch War.

Throughout the 16th and early part of the 17th centuries, units of foreign mercenaries were commonly used by all European powers. Domestic opposition to permanent armies as a result of the 1638–1651 Wars of the Three Kingdoms meant British monarchs used the brigade to create a pool of trained officers, who could be called on when needed. However, in the early 18th century, increasing demand meant permission to recruit in Britain was restricted on a number of occasions and finally banned after 1757.

After the end of the War of the Spanish Succession in 1714, the brigade was reduced to three regiments and primarily used to garrison the Barrier forts. In 1782, the Fourth Anglo-Dutch War led most of its British officers to leave the brigade and return to Britain. As the vast majority of its enlisted men were Dutch, the brigade was dissolved and its regiments renumbered as the 22nd, 23rd and 24th Infantry Regiments. Their traditions and battle honours were continued by the British Army's 94th Regiment of Foot until 1881, when the 94th was merged into the Connaught Rangers.

== Formation in 1586–1648 ==
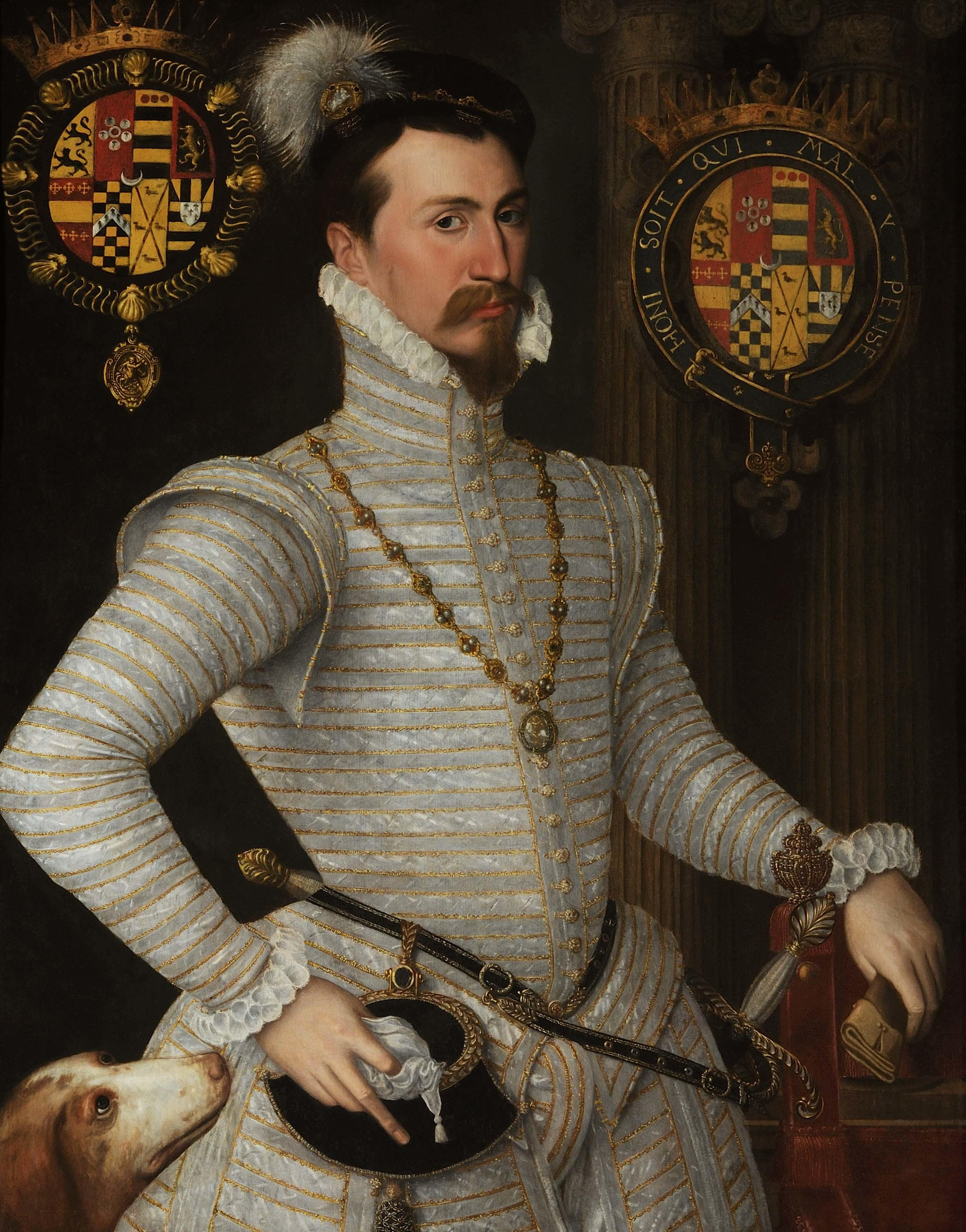
The Earl of Leicester, the first commander of the brigade

The Dutch fight for independence from Spain in the 1568 to 1648 Eighty Years' War attracted support from Protestants across Europe, including England and Scotland. The first of these was "Thomas Morgan's Company of Foot", a group of 300 volunteers from the London Trained Bands formed in 1572. They fought at the Relief of Goes, the defence of Delft the following year, the Siege of Haarlem and Middelburg as well as the naval victory in the Scheldt by 1574.

After the Treaty of Nonsuch in 1586, the Earl of Leicester expanded the brigade by adding three English regiments to the three existing Scottish units. Although his expedition was a political and military disaster, the brigade continued under the command of Sir Francis Vere and fought under Maurice of Nassau. Tactical innovations in the 1580s replaced the traditional slow moving infantry squares with smaller, more mobile units, and introduced the concept of volley fire. This created a preference for professional troops, rather than civilian militia, while recruitment was encouraged by both James I and Charles I, who viewed the brigade as a foreign policy tool, which also provided a pool of trained military professionals if needed.

The Thirty Years' War created multiple opportunities to serve in the armies of Protestant nations like Sweden, Norway and Denmark; Dutch service became less attractive, while the brigade was primarily used on garrison duty. However, recruitment levels were maintained by strong religious, economic and cultural links between Scotland and the Netherlands. When the Wars of the Three Kingdoms broke out in 1638, many individuals returned home but the brigade continued to serve in the Dutch army until the Peace of Münster ended the war with Spain in 1648.

== 1648–1697 ==
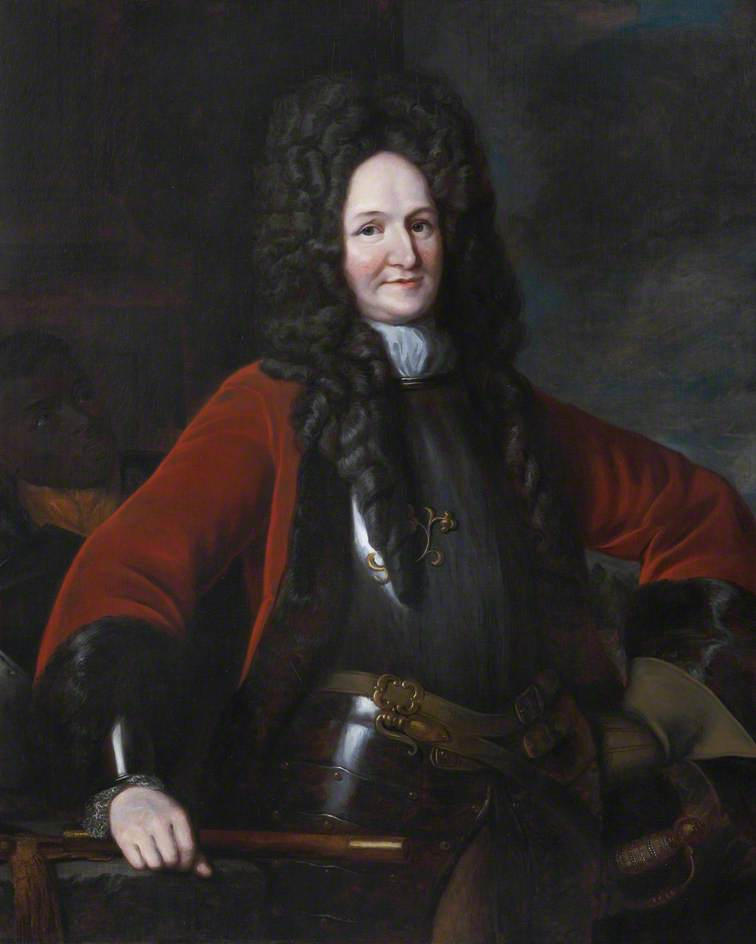
Hugh Mackay, who reestablished the brigade in the 1670s

In the late 17th century, the experience of the Wars of the Three Kingdoms and the Protectorate meant strong resistance in both Scotland and England to a standing army. Formations like the brigade thus provided an outlet for Scots and English who wanted to pursue a military career; professional officers formed a small and tight-knit group, who moved between armies, often regardless of nationality, religion or political belief. Most armies contained a wide mix of nationalities; in 1672, 12 out of 58 French infantry battalions were recruited outside France, as were 9 of its 87 cavalry regiments.

During the 1665–1667 Second Anglo-Dutch War, officers were required to swear allegiance to the Dutch government but many refused to do so. The English regiments were withdrawn in 1665, reinstated in 1667, then withdrawn again when the Third Anglo-Dutch War began in 1672. The alliance between England and France was deeply unpopular; while the Franco-Dutch War continued until 1678, the two countries made peace with the 1674 Treaty of Westminster.

Uncertainty and constant changes impacted recruitment and William III of Orange complained about its low morale and quality; by 1674, only 13 officers in the three nominally Scottish regiments were Scots. Hugh Mackay was largely responsible for recreating the brigade by suggesting they re-establish the regiments by recruiting from Scotland and England. Recruitment was controlled by Charles II and his brother James II; they also appointed the officers but this required negotiation, as shown by the failure of attempts to install the Catholic Earl of Dumbarton as commander. Nevertheless, James managed to ensure it contained a number of Catholics like Thomas Buchan and Alexander Cannon; during the Jacobite rising of 1689 in Scotland, both sides included a number of former Brigade officers, including Buchan, Cannon, George Ramsay, Hugh Mackay, Viscount Dundee and Sir Thomas Livingstone.

The brigade was lent to James in June 1685 to suppress simultaneous rebellions in Scotland and England, but both quickly collapsed and it returned to the Netherlands without seeing action. In early 1688, James demanded the repatriation of the entire Brigade but it was clear war with France was imminent and William refused to comply. The brigade accompanied his invasion of England in November 1688; a small detachment took part in the Wincanton Skirmish on 20 November 1688, one of the few actions fought during the largely bloodless campaign. In March 1689, Hugh Mackay and the three Scottish regiments were sent to Scotland to suppress the Jacobite uprising; the brigade returned to Flanders for the Nine Years War and suffered heavy casualties at Steenkerque in 1692, where McKay was killed.

== 1701 to dissolution in 1782 ==
The expansion of the British military during the War of the Spanish Succession led to restrictions on Dutch recruitment in Scotland and was halted entirely in 1709. Relaxed after 1714, they were re-imposed after the Jacobite rising of 1745, due to concern rebels might use it to escape. For most of the 18th century, the brigade was used to man the Dutch Barrier forts. In the War of the Austrian Succession, detachments fought at Fontenoy, Rocoux and Lauffeld and served during the 1747 siege. After it fell to the French, the garrison withdrew to Steenbergen, which they successfully defended until the war ended in 1748; by then, only 200 officers and men of the original 800 remained. It is likely some men under Alexander Marjoribanks stayed at Loevestein Castle between 1750 and 1754 where there is a fresco depicting Lord George Murray (general), his wife, son and a piper.

The war confirmed the decline of the Dutch Republic as a major European power and it did not take part in the Seven Years' War. The brigade remained a distinct force but long service in the Netherlands meant that by the 1760s the vast majority of recruits either came from Scottish families settled in the Netherlands for generations or were not Scottish at all. This was accelerated when the right to recruit in Scotland was finally ended in 1757. The outbreak of the American War of Independence in 1775 caused tensions with Britain since the Dutch were generally sympathetic towards the colonists. The Dutch island of Sint Eustatius was used to evade the British blockade of the United States, with over 2,400 ships clearing the port in 1777 alone, while a British request for the 'loan' of the Scots Brigade was rejected. In September 1780, the British intercepted a draft commercial treaty between the American agent in Aix-la-Chapelle and members of the Amsterdam business community and declared war in December.

Since it was technically a British unit on loan whose officers held commissions from George III, this caused obvious problems when the countries were at war. On 18 November 1782, all officers were required to take an oath to the stadtholder but most refused and returned to Britain; they included a colonel, five lieutenant-colonels, three majors, 11 captains (including John Gabriel Stedman), three lieutenants and 29 ensigns. Distinctive markers such as red uniforms, British colours and the "Scottish March" were abolished and the units renumbered as the 22nd, 23rd and 24th Infantry Regiments. When peace came in 1784, a combination of political and cultural changes meant the brigade was not reformed.

== Legacy ==
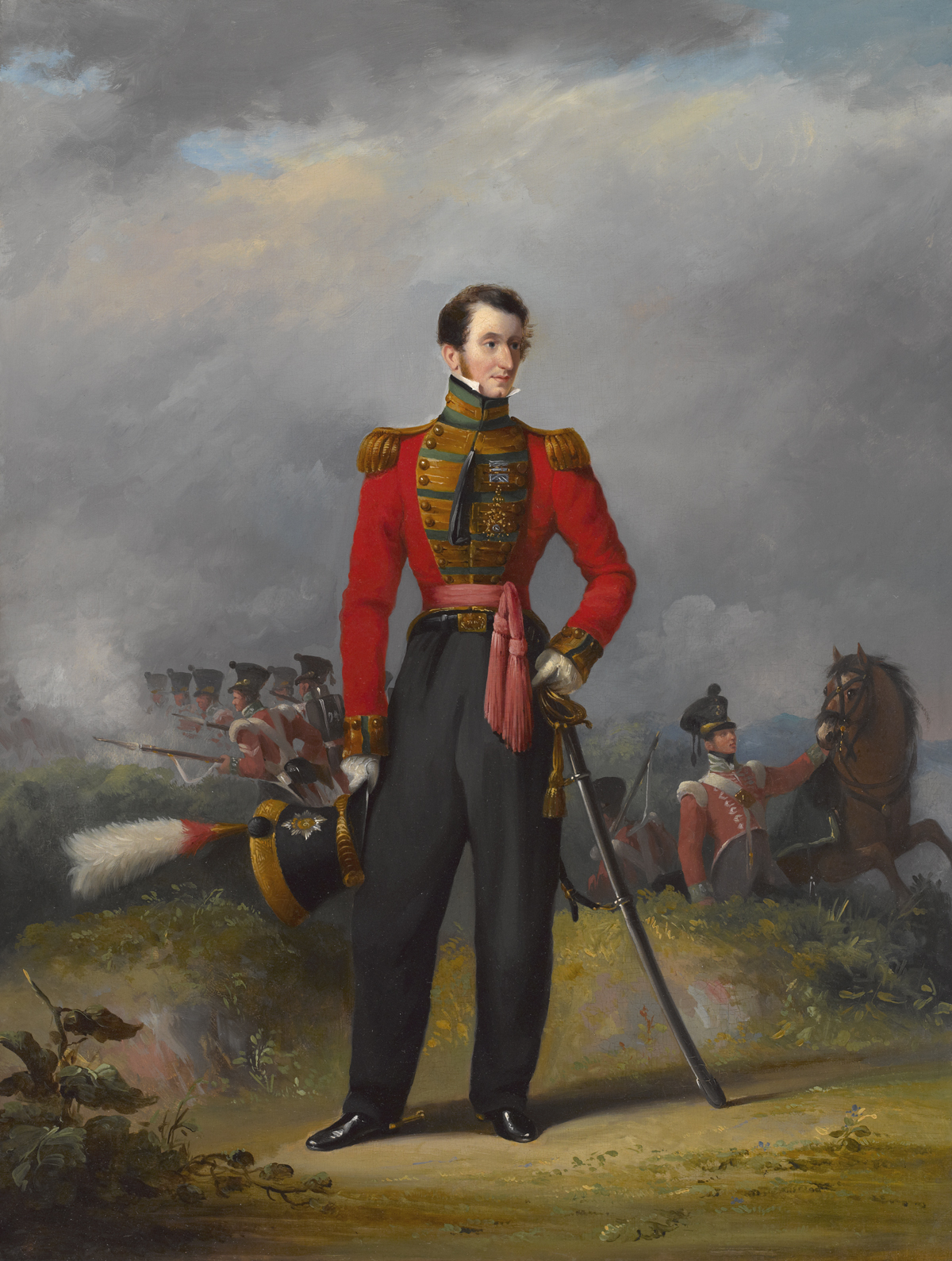
Lieutenant General Sir Thomas Bradford, 1825; Colonel, 94th Foot "The Scotch Brigade"

Those officers who resigned their commissions in 1782 continued to petition the British government for the brigade to be reconstituted in some form. In October 1794, 23 former Brigade officers joined a new unit raised for service in India, the Scotch Brigade. The regiment was re-numbered as the 94th Regiment of Foot in 1802 and assumed the battle honours and colours of the brigade until 1881 when it became part of the Connaught Rangers; the regimental colours can now be seen in St Giles', Edinburgh, with copies also in the Netherlands. Over the years many ex-soldiers settled in the Netherlands, including Hugh Mackay, whose son, nephews and grandsons all served with the brigade. This branch ultimately became hereditary Chiefs of Clan Mackay and continue to hold the titles of Lord Reay in the Scottish peerage and Lord of Ophemert and Zennewijnen in the Netherlands. Other less distinguished descendants included Dutch Colonial Army Captain Rudolf MacLeod, who in 1895 became the husband of Mata Hari when she responded to his advertisement for a wife. The progenitor of the Dutch branch of the Hamilton family was John Jack (Johannes Jacobi) Hamilton. He was born in 1640 in Dromore, Kirkcudbright, South Scotland. He served as the palfrenier to the Governor of 's-Hertogenbosch, John Kirkpatrick. In 1679 he married Maria Wijgherganck.

In his novel The Heart of Mid-Lothian, set in the Porteous Riots of 1736, Sir Walter Scott references the brigade, as the Scotch Dutch;

Captain John Porteous, a name memorable in the traditions of Edinburgh, as well as in the records of criminal jurisprudence, was the son of a citizen of Edinburgh, who endeavoured to breed him up to his own mechanical trade of a tailor. The youth, however, had a wild and irreclaimable propensity to dissipation, which finally sent him to serve in the corps long maintained in the service of the States of Holland, and called the Scotch Dutch. Here he learned military discipline; and, returning afterwards, in the course of an idle and wandering life, to his native city.

== Sources ==
- Chandler, David; Beckett, Ian (1996). The Oxford History Of The British Army. Oxford University Press. ISBN 978-0192803115.
- Childs, John (2014). General Percy Kirke and the Later Stuart Army. Bloomsbury Academic. ISBN 978-1474255141.
- Childs, John (1984). "The British Brigade in France 1672-1678". History. 69 (227).
- Childs, John (1985). "The Scottish brigade in the service of the Dutch Republic, 1689 to 1782". Documentatieblad Werkgroep Achttiende Eeuw.
- Childs, John (1991). The Nine Years' War and the British Army 1688–97: The Operations in the Low Countries (2013 ed.). Manchester University Press. ISBN 978-0-7190-8996-1.
- Colyear Robertson, WP, Colonel (June 1790). Letter (Bundle 1711-1712 ed.). PRO no 89.
- Conway, Stephen (2010). "The Scots Brigade in the 18th Century". Northern Scotland. 1 (1).
- Davenport, Frances Gardiner (1917). European Treaties bearing on the History of the United States and its Dependencies. Washington, D.C. Carnegie Institution of Washington].
- Ede-Borrett, Stephen (2011). "Casualties in the Anglo-Dutch Brigade at St Denis, 1678". Journal of the Society for Army Historical Research. 81 (237).
- Glozier, Mathew (2004). Scottish Soldiers in France in the Reign of the Sun King: Nursery for Men of Honour. Brill. ISBN 978-9004138650.
- Glozier, Mathew (2001). Scotland and the Thirty Years' War, 1618-1648; Steve Murdoch et al. Brill. ISBN 978-9004120860.
- Henshaw, Victoria (2011). Scotland and the British Army; 1700-1750 (PDF) (PHD). University of Birmingham.;
- Knight, Charles Raleigh (1905). Historical records of The Buffs, East Kent Regiment (3rd Foot) formerly designated the Holland Regiment and Prince George of Denmark's Regiment. Vol. I. Gale & Polden.
- McKilliop, Andrew & Murdoch, Steve (ed); Fighting for Identity: Scottish Military Experiences c.1550–1900; 2002;
- Messenger, Charles (2001). Reader's Guide to Military History. Routledge. ISBN 978-1579582418.
- Miggelbrink, Joachim (2002). McKilliop, Andrew; Murdoch, Steve (eds.). The End of the Dutch-Scots Brigade in "Fighting for Identity: Scottish Military Experiences c.1550-1900". Brill. pp. 91–92. ISBN 978-9004128231.
- Miller, Daniel (1970). Sir Joseph Yorke and Anglo-Dutch Relations 1774-1780. Mouton de Gruyter. ISBN 978-3111002286.
- Unknown (1795). An Historical Account of the British Regiments Employed Since the Reign of Queen Elizabeth and King James I In the Formation and Defence of the Dutch Republic Particularly of the Scotch Brigade (2009 ed.). University of Michigan Library.
