= Wincanton Skirmish =

1688 engagement of the Glorious Revolution

Coordinates: 51.058°N 2.405°W

- Part of the 1688 invasion of England and Glorious Revolution
Date	30 November 1688
Location	Wincanton, Somerset
Result	Inconclusive

Belligerents
England	Dutch Republic

Commanders and leaders
(Kingdom of England) Patrick Sarsfield (Kingdom of England) Henry Luttrell	(Dutch Republic) Campbell †

Strength
120	30

Casualties and losses
5+ killed and wounded	12 killed 6 captured

The Wincanton Skirmish took place on 30 November 1688 in Wincanton, Somerset during the 1688 invasion of England. A small cavalry patrol of the English Army under Patrick Sarsfield clashed with a detachment of the Dutch States Army's Scots Brigade in one of only two minor battles fought in England during the Glorious Revolution.

== Background ==
Following the landing of William of Orange in Torbay, Devon, forces loyal to James II had assembled on Salisbury Plain. Colonel Patrick Sarsfield was one of the most active officers on the King's behalf, at a time of growing doubts about the trustworthiness of other commanders. Inconclusive reports had arrived that Williamite forces had been spotted at Bruton, close to Wincanton. Sarsfield was ordered by his superior General Percy Kirke to take out a fresh patrol and investigate.

== Battle ==
On the morning of 30 November, Sarsfield rode out from the royal camp with 120 Horse Guards and Horse Grenadier Guards including his second-in-command and fellow Irishman Henry Luttrell. After riding to Bruton, they discovered that the enemy force had marched to Wincanton the previous day. The Dutch troops were in fact a small advance guard of around thirty infantry who had been sent ahead of their main army to secure horses for military use. They were Scottish troops of Hugh Mackay's regiment who were serving in the Scots Brigade of the Dutch Army, and were led by a Lieutenant Campbell. Their instructions were to remain at Wincanton until joined by William's main force.

Campbell received warning of the enemy's approach from local inhabitants sympathetic to William, and decided to set an ambush for Sarsfield's men between Flingers Lane and Ireson Lane just outside Wincanton. Unsure if the approaching cavalry were hostile, given they might be deserters, Campbell shouted out a challenge demanding to know who the men supported. Sarsfield replied King James, and after Campbell responded that he was for Prince of Orange, Sarsfield reportedly cried "God damn you! I'll Prince You!" and both sides opened fire. In the ensuing melee Campbell was shot dead. Although Sarsfield's men comfortably outnumbered their opponents, the Scottish troops were in well-concealed positions and their fire took out several of the cavalrymen. Many of Sarsfield's men dismounted and fought on foot, returning the enemy fire and hurling grenades at them. Henry Lutrell led some of his men to outflank the enemy who were increasingly vulnerable.

The fighting was stopped by one of the locals who rushed out of Wincanton warning Sarsfield's men that they were about to be attacked by large Dutch reinforcements in the village. This was in fact a completely false report, brought out by a miller who supported William's cause. A cautious Sarsfield disengaged and pulled his men back out of musket range, allowing the remaining Scots time to flee. Sarsfield subsequently occupied Wincanton, having taken six prisoners and some of the horses that the Scottish troops had been gathering. Several of Sarsfield's men had been killed or wounded. Cornet John Webb, a future general, was badly wounded and had to be left in the village to recover. A total of twelve Scots, including Campbell, had been killed in the fighting.

== Aftermath ==
News of the fighting quickly spread around the country. Some reports wrongly suggested a major battle had taken place at Wincanton in which the King's forces had been routed. Wincanton was then occupied by the Dutch Army and William spent the night at a house there.

The skirmish, along with the subsequent Battle of Reading, proved to be one of only two armed clashes during 1688. Although a major battle between the two field armies was widely anticipated, very little fighting took place. A series of defections amongst his senior officers led James to order a retreat to London; his army gradually disintegrated along the way and was finally disbanded at Uxbridge. William was able to enter London without fighting the expected pitched battle. James fled into exile, while William and his wife were crowned in his place.

Patrick Sarsfield subsequently distinguished himself fighting for James during the Williamite War in Ireland (1689–91).

== Commemoration ==
The Orange Way long-distance footpath, created in 2003 to follow William's route from Devon to London, passes through Wincanton.

== Bibliography ==
- Harris, Tim & Taylor, Stephen. The Final Crisis of the Stuart Monarchy: The Revolutions of 1688-91 in Their British, Atlantic and European Contexts. Boydell & Brewer, 2015.
- Wauchope, Piers. Patrick Sarsfield and the Williamite War. Irish Academic Press, 1992.
