= Jacobite rising of 1689 =

Scottish Highlands revolt to restore the House of Stuart

- Part of the Glorious Revolution and the Jacobite risings
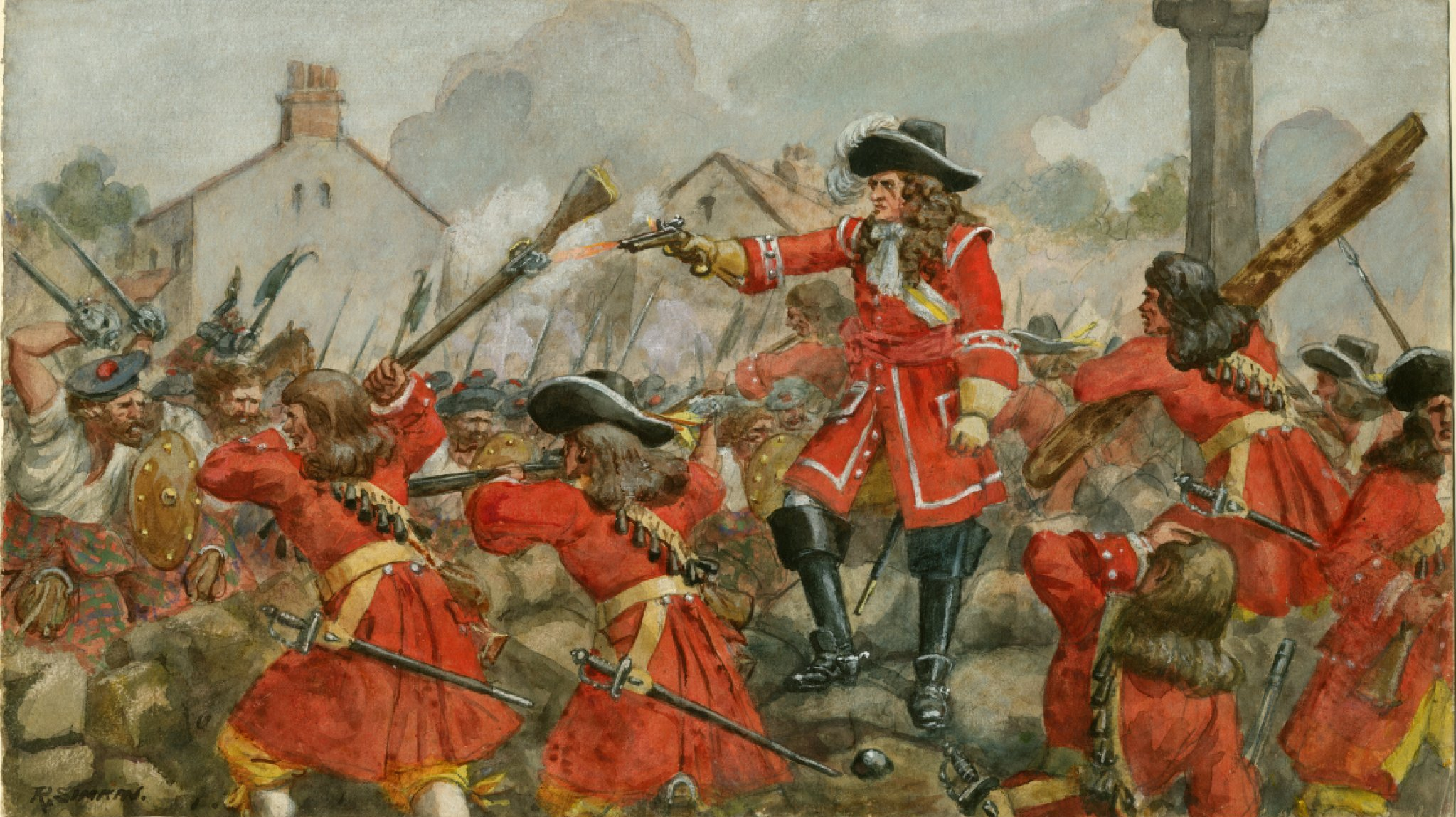
- The Battle of Dunkeld
| Date | March 1689 – February 1692 |
| Location | Kingdom of Scotland |
| Result | Government victory |

Belligerents
| (Kingdom of Scotland) Scottish Government | Jacobites |

Commanders and leaders
| (Kingdom of Scotland) Hugh Mackay (Kingdom of Scotland) Thomas Livingstone | Viscount Dundee †; Ewen Cameron; Alexander Cannon; Thomas Buchan |

Strength
| 5,000 – 10,000 (maximum) | 4,000 – 5,000 (maximum) |

Casualties and losses
| 2,000 – 2,500 (estimate) | 1,500 – 2,000 (estimate) |

The Jacobite rising of 1689 (Note: Supporters of James were known as "Jacobites", from the Latin "Jacobus", and the associated political movement as Jacobitism) took place from March 1689 to February 1692 in Scotland. Its purpose was to restore James VII to the throne, following his deposition by the November 1688 Glorious Revolution. It was the first of a series of attempts to restore the House of Stuart that continued into the late 18th century.

A minor part of the wider European conflict known as the Nine Years' War, the Scottish revolt was intended to support the 1689 to 1691 Williamite War in Ireland. Despite Jacobite victory at Killiecrankie in July 1689, their leader John Graham, 1st Viscount Dundee was killed in the final attack. Combined with limited resources, his death meant the rising never really threatened the new administration of William II and Mary II. Major military action ended at Cromdale in May 1690, although the Highlands were not considered pacified until after the Massacre of Glencoe in February 1692.

== Background ==
In February 1685, James II & VII came to power with widespread support in all three kingdoms of England, Scotland and Ireland, despite his personal Catholicism. In predominantly Catholic Ireland, it was hoped he would return land confiscated from Catholics during the 17th century, and repeal penal laws restricting their right to hold public office. In England and Scotland, both of which were overwhelmingly Protestant, the experience of the 1638 to 1651 Wars of the Three Kingdoms meant that many feared the consequences of bypassing the 'natural heir'. The desire for stability led to the rapid collapse of two Protestant risings in June 1685, the Monmouth Rebellion in England, and Argyll's Rising in Scotland.

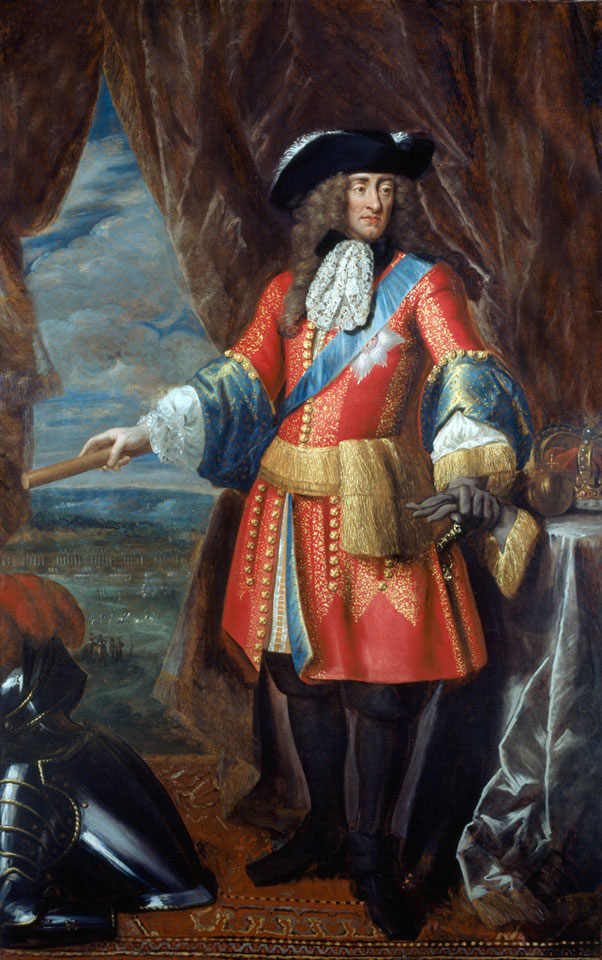
James II & VII

The 1681 Scottish Succession and Test Acts made obedience to the monarch a legal obligation, 'regardless of religion'; in return, James swore to uphold the primacy of the Church of Scotland or kirk. By 1680, over 95 percent of Scots were members of the kirk; Catholics numbered less than 2% of the population and even other Protestant sects were barred. Attempts to repeal the Scottish Test Act undermined his moderate supporters, while rewarding the dissident Presbyterians who backed Argyll in 1685.

The perception that James was willing to ignore his commitments, his Coronation Oath and his own supporters seriously undermined his position in Scotland. In October 1685, an estimated 200,000 French Protestants were forced into exile by the Edict of Fontainebleau, while French expansion under Louis XIV threatened the Protestant Dutch Republic. Close economic and cultural ties between Scotland and fellow Calvinists in France and Holland exacerbated fears Protestant Europe was threatened by a Catholic counter-reformation.

Two events turned dissent into a crisis, the first being the birth on 10 June of James' son, James Francis Edward Stuart. Based on the principle of Primogeniture, he took precedence over the existing heirs, James' Protestant daughter Mary, and her husband William of Orange. For the first time, a Catholic monarch became a long-term prospect, rather than a temporary one. The second and connected issue was prosecution of the Seven Bishops, which seemed to go beyond advocating tolerance for Catholicism, and into an assault on the Church of England. This appeared to also threaten the kirk, and their acquittal on 30 June destroyed James' political authority in both Scotland and England.

Prior to 1685, many feared civil war if James were bypassed; by 1688, it seemed only his removal could prevent one. French preparations for a new offensive against the Dutch Republic and its allies made William anxious to either secure English resources, or prevent them being used against him. The Invitation to William published in July provided assurances of support for armed intervention from across the English political class, including those who had previously supported James. The Nine Years War began in September and on 5 November, William landed in Brixham with 14,000 men; as he advanced, much of the Royal Army deserted and James went into exile on 23 December. In February, the Parliament of England made William and Mary joint monarchs of England.

== The Scottish Convention ==
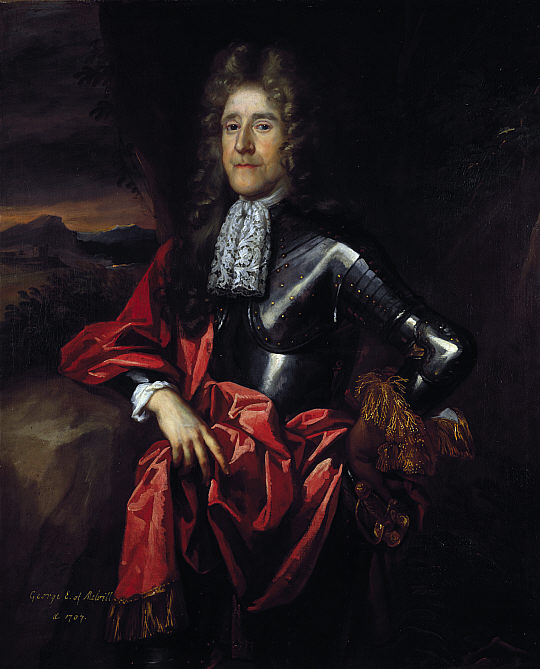
George Melville, 1st Earl of Melville, government leader in Parliament

In March 1689, elections were held for a Scottish Convention to agree a settlement. Many of William's advisors were Scottish exiles like Argyll and Melville, who wanted to expel bishops from the kirk. When the Convention assembled in March, the 125 delegates were split roughly 75:50 between Presbyterians and Episcopalians; only a tiny minority were loyal to James, the real debate being control of the kirk and the limits of Royal authority.

On 12 March, James landed in Ireland; he sent the Convention a letter, which was read out on 16 March, demanding obedience and threatening punishment for non-compliance. Public anger meant some Episcopalians stopped attending meetings, claiming to fear for their safety, while others changed sides. In addition, the Catholic Duke of Gordon held Edinburgh Castle for James, while his former military commander Viscount Dundee began recruiting troops. The effect was to bolster the Presbyterian majority in the Convention, which met behind closed doors guarded by its own troops.

On 11 April, the Convention ended James' reign and adopted the Articles of Grievances and the Claim of Right Act that made Parliament the primary legislative power in Scotland. On 11 May 1689, William and Mary accepted the Scottish throne and the Convention became a full Parliament on 5 June.

== Jacobite rising ==
Key locations; 1689 Rising

Dundee's uprising was intended to complement the Jacobite offensive in Ulster but he had insufficient resources to maintain it without external support. Opposing him was the highly experienced Hugh Mackay who had a force of around 3,500, including 1,100 men from the veteran Dutch Scots Brigade. Ewen Cameron of Lochiel assembled some 1,800 Highland levies at Glenroy; Dundee joined him with around 40 companions and on 18 May, marched out in an attempt to bring Mackay to battle.

Aware of the short-term nature of Highland warfare, Mackay avoided combat and when Dundee returned to Glenroy in late June, most of the clansmen went home, leaving him with less than 200 men. His position was further weakened when Gordon surrendered Edinburgh Castle on 14 June, while Jacobite retreat from Ulster made resupply extremely difficult. The only reinforcements received by Dundee was a contingent of 300 Irish soldiers under Alexander Cannon, who landed near Duart Castle on 21 July.

Before returning to Glenroy, Dundee installed a Jacobite garrison at Blair Castle, a strategic point which controlled access to the Scottish Lowlands. Family seat of the Marquess of Atholl, it provides a good example of how many Scots tried to balance both sides. Atholl left for Bath, Somerset claiming ill-health, while his eldest son John Murray 'besieged' his ancestral home on behalf of the government. He was careful not to damage it, while its garrison was commanded by Patrick Stewart of Ballechin, a trusted Atholl family retainer.

When reinforcements led by Dundee arrived at Blair on 25 July, Murray withdrew, while Mackay left Perth with around 3,500 men and moved north to support him. At Killiecrankie on 27 July, the Jacobites won a resounding victory, inflicting nearly 2,000 casualties on Mackay but nearly a third of their army were killed, including Dundee. Cannon assumed command but without siege equipment he could not capture a port, making resupply almost impossible, while lack of cavalry made his Highland levies vulnerable in the open. Time was on Mackay's side, so long as he avoided another ambush.

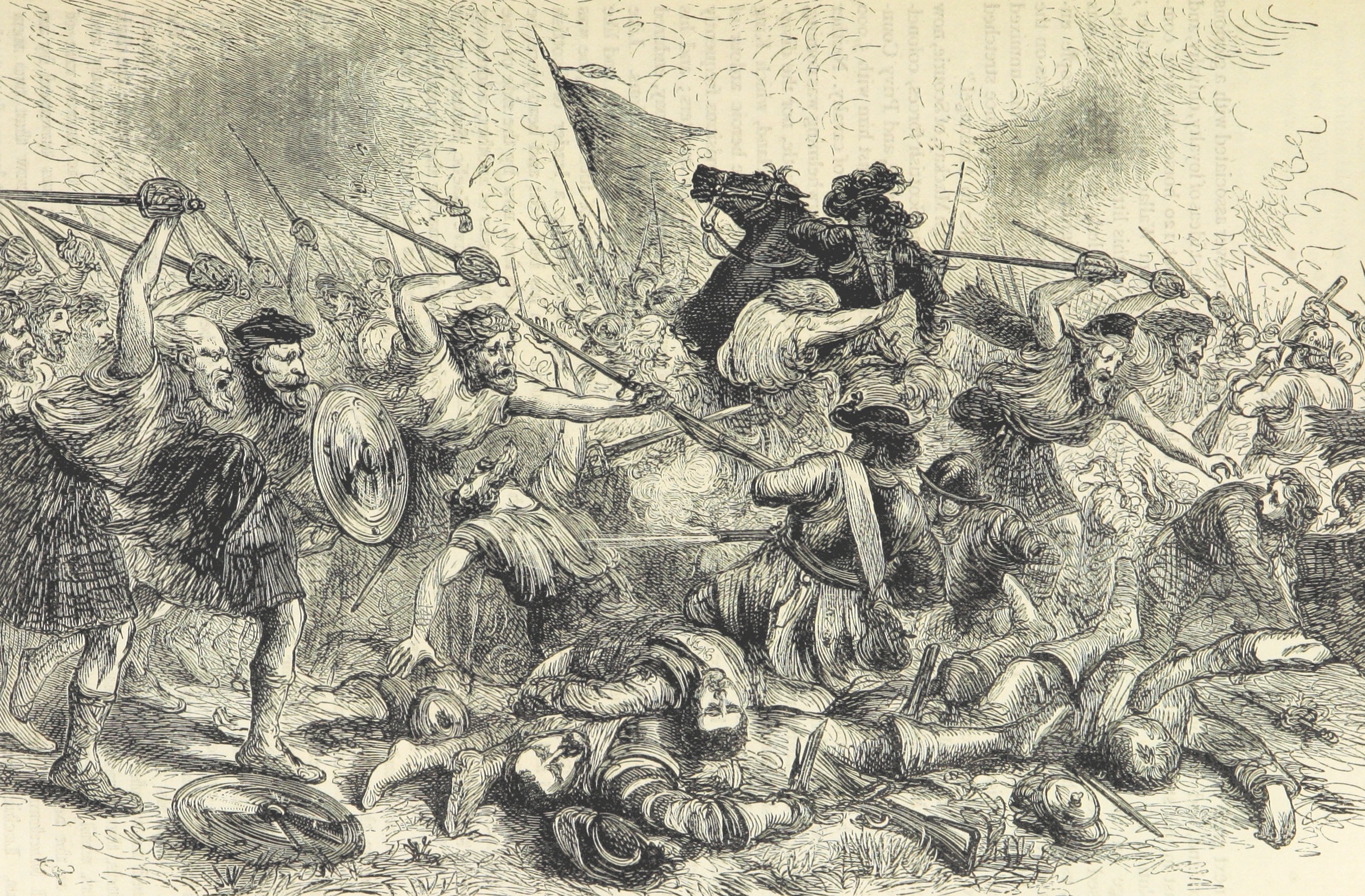
The Battle of Killiecrankie

After an assault on Dunkeld in August was repulsed with heavy losses, Cannon ended the campaign for the year, and his army dispersed. Mackay spent the winter reducing Jacobite strongholds and constructing a new base at Fort William, while harsh weather conditions led to severe food shortages throughout the Highlands. Thomas Buchan replaced Cannon in February 1690, but could only mobilise some 800 men; he was taken by surprise at Cromdale in May and his forces scattered. Mackay pursued Buchan into Aberdeenshire, preventing him from establishing a secure base. In November 1690, Mackay relinquished command to Thomas Livingstone.

Anxious to re-allocate resources to the war against France, in March 1690, Lord Stair offered the Jacobite chiefs £12,000 for swearing allegiance to William. They finally agreed to do so in the June 1691 Declaration of Achallader, although the war did not formally end until the Massacre of Glencoe in February 1692. Cannon and Buchan had been sheltered in the Highlands by the MacDonells of Glengarry, and as part of the deal that ended the Rising received safe conduct to France in March 1692.

== Aftermath ==
Although William wanted to retain bishops, the Rising highlighted his reliance on Presbyterian support. In an attempt to preserve Episcopalianism, the Scottish bishops proposed Union with England, which was rejected by the English Parliament. In October 1690, the General Assembly of the Church of Scotland met for the first time since 1653; the 1690 Settlement eliminated episcopacy and created two commissions for the south and north of the Tay, which over the next 25 years removed almost two-thirds of all ministers.

Acts of indulgence in 1693 and 1695 allowed many of these to return to the kirk, with others protected by the local gentry, such as Michael Fraser, minister at Daviot and Dunlichty. First appointed in 1673, he was still in office when he died in 1726, despite being evicted in 1694, as well as joining the 1715 and 1719 Jacobite Risings.

However, a significant element of the Scottish political class remained outside the kirk, eventually forming the Scottish Episcopal Church, which was officially sanctioned in 1711. Particularly strong in Aberdeenshire and Perthshire, it would be a major source of Jacobite support in subsequent risings.

== Sources ==
- Baker, Derek (2009). Schism, Heresy and Religious Protest. Cambridge University Press. ISBN 978-0521101783.
- Bosher, JF (February 1994). "The Franco-Catholic Danger, 1660–1715". History. 79 (255): 5–30. doi:10.1111/j.1468-229X.1994.tb01587.x.
- Chichester, H.M (2004). "Livingstone, Thomas, Viscount Teviot". Oxford Dictionary of National Biography (online ed.). Oxford University Press. doi:10.1093/ref:odnb/16810. (Subscription, Wikipedia Library access or UK public library membership required.)
- Coward, Barry (1980). The Stuart Age: England 1603–1714 (1994 ed.). Longman. ISBN 978-0582067226.
- Fritze, Ronald; Robison, William (1996). Historical Dictionary of Stuart England, 1603–1689. Greenwood. ISBN 0313283915.
- Harris, Tim (2007). Revolution; the Great Crisis of the British Monarchy 1685-1720. Penguin. ISBN 978-0141016528.
- Hill, James (1986). Celtic Warfare 1595–1763 (2017 ed.). Dalriada Publishers. ISBN 978-0-9708525-5-7.
- Kennedy, Allan (2016). "Rebellion, Government and the Scottish Response to Argyll's Rising of 1685" (PDF). Journal of Scottish Historical Studies. 36 (1): 40–59. doi:10.3366/jshs.2016.0167.
- Lenman, Bruce (1980). The Jacobite Risings in Britain 1689–1746. Eyre Methuen. ISBN 978-0413396501.
- Lynch, Michael (1992). Scotland: a New History. Pimlico Publishing. ISBN 0712698930.
- MacConechy, James (1843). Papers Illustrative of the Political Condition of the Highlands of Scotland (2012 ed.). Nabu Press.;
- Mackie, JD; Lenman, Bruce; Parker, Geoffrey (1986). A History of Scotland. Hippocrene Books. ISBN 978-0880290401.
- Macpherson, James (2017) [1775]. Original Papers: Containing the Secret History of Great Britain (2017 ed.). Hansebooks. ISBN 978-3-7434-3572-8.
- Miller, John (1978). James II; A study in kingship. Menthuen. ISBN 0413652904. OL 19463610M.
- Spielvogel, Jackson J (1980). Western Civilization. Wadsworth Publishing. ISBN 1285436407.
- Szechi, Daniel (1994). The Jacobites: Britain and Europe, 1688-1788. Manchester University Press. ISBN 0719037743.
- Wormsley, David (2015). James II: The Last Catholic King. Allen Lane. ISBN 978-0141977065.
