= Henry Balfour (Scottish privateer) =

Scottish Officer during the Eighty Years War

- Born: c.1540 near Kelso, Scotland
- Died: November 1580 near Bruges, Belgium
- Spouse: Cristian Cant
- Children: several children including Sir William Balfour
- Military career
- Allegiance: Dutch Republic
- Service years: 1570–1580
- Rank: Colonel General
- Nickname: Harry Balfour
- Commands: Scots Brigade
- Conflicts: Eighty Years War; Siege of Haarlem; Siege of Leiden; Siege of Oudewater (1575); Battle of Gembloux (1578); Battle of Rijmenam

Colonel General Henry Balfour was a Scottish soldier, privateer, and military commander who fought in the service of William I, Prince of Orange, during the early stages of the Dutch Revolt, otherwise known as the Eighty Years War. He was a prominent officer among the Scottish mercenary troops and is one of the earliest commanders of what later became the Scots Brigade.

== Early Life & possible french service ==
Henry Balfour was born around the year 1540 to the Balfour Family of Mackerston. Following Scotland's long tradition of providing soldiers for foreign armies, he pursued his military career abroad.

Although a 'Henry Balfour' is listed as serving in the Garde Écossaise in France between 1562 and 1568, it remains uncertain whether this refers to him or an individual of the same name.

== Eighty Years War ==
By early 1570s, Balfour had joined the forces of William I of Orange, leader of the Dutch rebellion. In 1571, William of Orange granted Balfour a letter of marque, authorizing him to attack Spanish interests at sea. This made Balfour both a military officer and a privateer. In 1572, Balfour arrived in the Netherlands with Scottish troops and became the leader of those troops, serving under William of Orange.

Balfour gained prominence during the Siege of Haarlem, where Balfour commanded Scottish soldiers who defended the city and participated in several attacks against the Spanish. After the death of Colonel Andrew Ormiston, Balfour became the head commander of all Scottish troops serving the Dutch rebels. By the mid-1570s, he held the rank of Colonel General of Scots in Dutch service, these troops were the foundation for the Scots Brigade. Balfour participated in several other battles including but not limited to the Siege of Leiden and the Battle of Rijmenam.

== Death ==
Balfour was killed in November 1580 while campaigning against the Spanish near Bruges, Belgium.
