= Battle of Cromdale =

Battle at the Haughs of Cromdale on 30 April and 1 May 1690

- Part of the Jacobite rising of 1689
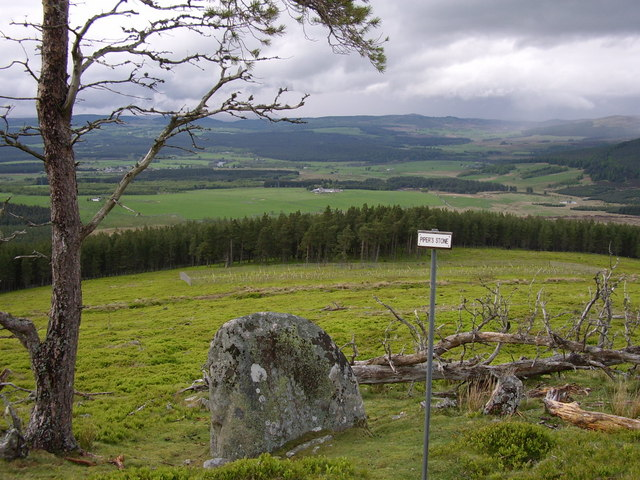
- The Piper's Stone, a boulder upon which a mortally wounded Jacobite piper played music to encourage his comrades
Date	30 April – 1 May 1690
Location	Cromdale, Moray, Scotland 57°19′54″N 3°29′21″W
Result	Government victory

Belligerents
(Kingdom of Scotland) Scottish Government	Jacobites

Commanders and leaders
Thomas Livingstone; Ludovick Grant	Thomas Buchan; John Cameron

Strength
2,000	800

Casualties and losses
~100 killed	400 killed

Registered battlefield
- Designated: 30 November 2011
- Reference no.: BTL20
- Location within Scotland

The Battle of Cromdale took place at the Haughs of Cromdale on 30 April and 1 May 1690. The site is on a hillside near the village of Cromdale, Strathspey, historically within the county of Inverness-shire. The battlefield has been included in the Inventory of Historic Battlefields in Scotland and protected by Historic Scotland under the Scottish Historical Environment Policy of 2009.

== Background ==
After their defeat at the Battle of Dunkeld in 1689, the Highland clans had returned to their homes in low spirits. Sir Ewen Cameron assumed control over the army's remnant. Sir Ewen and the other Jacobite chiefs complained to King James over the precarious state of his support in Scotland and the necessity of sending them aid. James was occupied with preparations for resisting a threatened invasion of Ireland. To aid his supporters in Scotland, James sent clothing, arms, ammunition and provisions. He also directed a few officers from Ireland to Lochaber, among whom was Major-General Thomas Buchan, whom James made commander-in-chief of the Jacobite forces in Scotland.

On Buchan's arrival, a meeting of the chiefs and principal officers was held at Keppoch to formulate a plan of action. While some of the clans proposed to submit to the government, this proposition was resisted by Sir Ewen. The meeting unanimously resolved to continue the war, but not until the labours of the spring season were complete in the Highlands. The general muster of the clans was postponed. In the meantime, a detachment of 1,200 infantrymen was to be placed at Buchan's disposal to weaken the enemy's quarters along the borders of the Lowlands.

General Buchan advanced his men through Badenoch, intending to march down Speyside into the Duke of Gordon's country, where he expected to muster additional forces. Due to desertion, Buchan's force had dwindled to 800 men. Ignoring counsel from his Scottish officers not to advance past Culnakill, (the modern Coulnakyle near Nethybridge) Buchan marched down the Spey as far as Cromdale where he encamped on the last day of April, contrary to the advice of his officers who warned him of the dangers of camping thence. Buchan had elected to encamp in view of Freuchie Castle in the hope that by such a show of strength he could gain the support of Clan Grant.

== Battle ==
Buchan was met at Cromdale, near what is now the town of Grantown-on-Spey, by a larger government force under Sir Thomas Livingstone, commander of the garrison of Inverness, who was accompanied by local Grant guides. As Livingstone approached with his men, on the opposite bank of the Spey, the Jacobite forces started to retreat. Livingstone's cavalry crossed the river and intercepted the Jacobites who made a brief stand at the foot of the hill of Cromdale. However, a thick fog came down the side of the mountain and enveloped the outnumbered Jacobites, compelling Livingstone to discontinue the pursuit. According to reports, the Highlanders had 400 men killed and taken prisoner. Livingstone's losses were reported as between none and 100 killed.

A group of around 100 men, who had separated from the main Jacobite force, crossed the Spey the following day. After being pursued by some of Livingstone's men, they were overtaken and dispersed on the moor of Granish near Aviemore, where some of them were killed. They attempted to seize the castle of Loch an Eilein, but their attack was repelled by the proprietor and his tenants.

== Aftermath ==
The defeat at Cromdale effectively ended the 1689 rebellion in Scotland. The battle is commemorated in the ballad The Haughs of Cromdale. The song confuses the Jacobite defeat at the Battle of Cromdale with James Graham, 1st Marquess of Montrose's victory against the Roundheads at the Battle of Auldearn 45 years earlier. Montrose was executed by the Parliamentarians in 1650, and Oliver Cromwell died in 1658. The Haughs of Cromdale is listed in James Hogg's Jacobite Relics as song number 2. Hogg described its artistic licence as "the worst specimen of the truth of Scottish song that is to be met with", and speculated that the song as collected was originally two different ballads that were later conflated as Jacobite propaganda.

The last verse reads:

The loyal Stewarts, with Montrose,
So boldly set upon their foes,
And brought them down with Highland blows,
Upon the haughs of Cromdale.
Of twenty thousand, Cromwell's men,
Five hundred fled to Aberdeen,
The rest of them lie on the plain,
Upon the haughs of Cromdale.
