= Siege of Maastricht =

The siege of Maastricht may refer to one of several sieges:

- Siege of Maastricht (1579) by Spanish forces during the Eighty Years' War of 1568–1648
- Capture of Maastricht (1632) by Dutch forces during the Eighty Years' War of 1568–1648
- Siege of Maastricht (1673) by French forces during the Franco-Dutch War of 1672–1678
- Siege of Maastricht (1676) by Dutch forces during the Franco-Dutch War of 1672–1678
- Siege of Maastricht (1748) by French forces during the War of the Austrian Succession of 1740–1748
- Siege of Maastricht (1793) by French forces during the War of the First Coalition of 1792–1797
- Siege of Maastricht (1794) by French forces during the War of the First Coalition of 1792–1797
