= Francis Fergus O'Farrell =

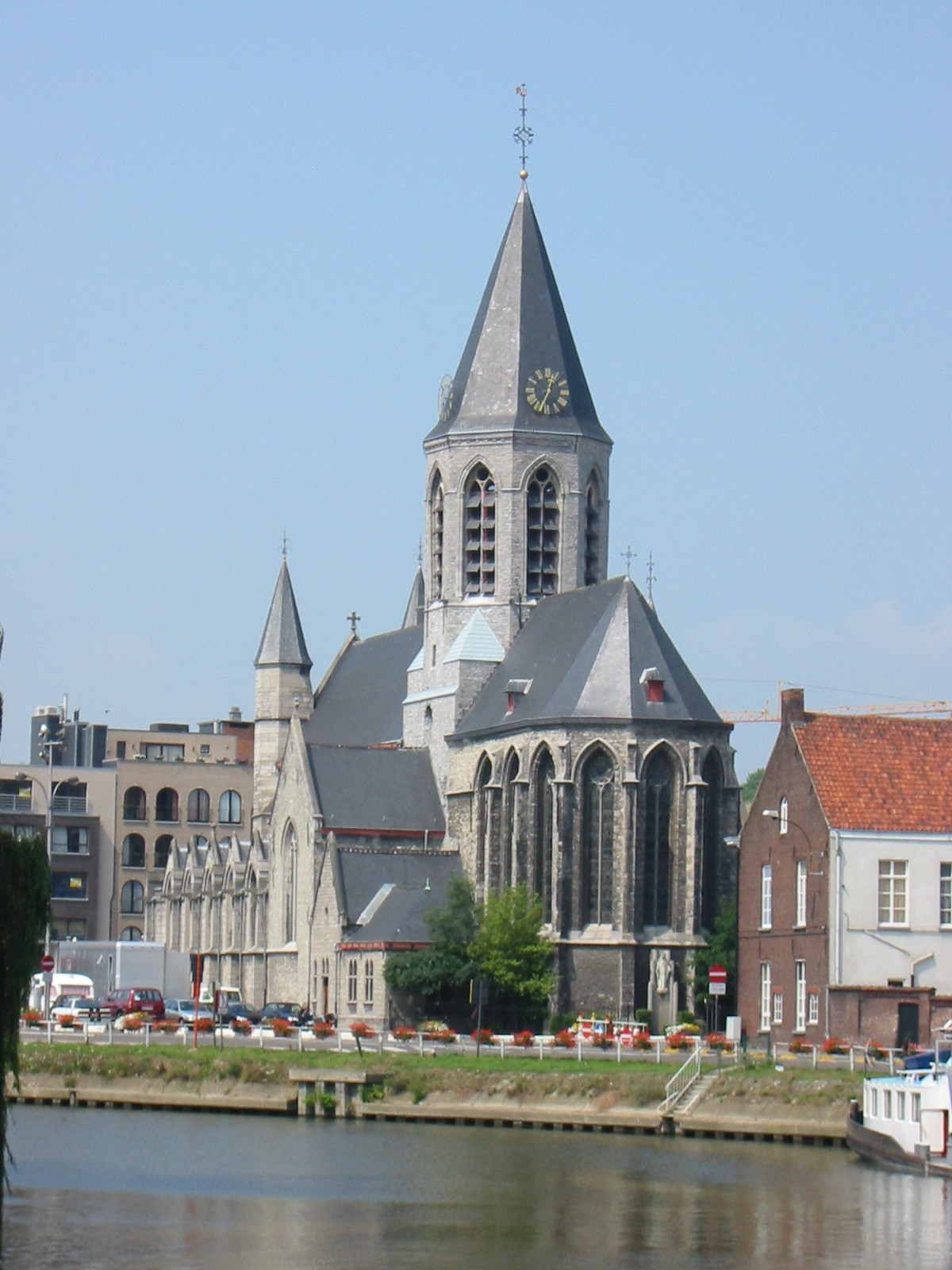
- Deinze; O'Farrell's surrender of this town in 1695 resulted in his court-martial
- Born: c. 1650; County Longford, Ireland
- Died: 1712 (aged 54–55)
- Military career
- Branch: Infantry
- Rank: Major-General
- Conflicts: Franco-Dutch War; Glorious Revolution 1688; Nine Years' War; Walcourt; Battle of Steenkerque; Landen; Deinze; War of the Spanish Succession

Major General Francis Fergus O’Farrell c. 1650 to 1712, was an Irish-born professional soldier who served in the Dutch States Army under William III until 1689, when he transferred into the English Army. During the Nine Years' War in 1695, he was cashiered for his premature surrender of the town of Deinze, then reinstated in 1696 and served in the War of the Spanish Succession.

== Early life ==
Francis Fergus O’Farrell was born in County Longford in 1650, presumably a member of the O’Farrell clan who traditionally dominated the area, although his parentage is unclear. His distant cousin Ceadagh O'Farrell was killed at the Battle of the Boyne in 1690 fighting for the Jacobites, while other relatives joined the French Irish Brigade, so Francis was unusual in serving the Protestant William of Orange.

O'Farrell had at least two children, a son also named Francis Fergus who married Mary Emmett in June 1712, and a daughter Diana (?–before 1728), who married Francis Howard, 1st Earl of Effingham in February 1713.

== Career ==
O’Farrell appears to have begun his military career serving in one of the regiments of the Scots Brigade and took part in the 1672 to 1678 Franco-Dutch War. By 1688, he had reached the rank of Lieutenant Colonel and was part of the invasion force that accompanied William of Orange to England in the November 1688 Glorious Revolution. There was very little fighting; the vast majority of James II's army simply changed sides and he went into exile in France. On 1 March 1689, O'Farrell was commissioned Colonel of the Earl of Mars Regiment in place of Thomas Buchan, a Scottish Catholic who had remained loyal to James. It reached Flanders in time to fight at the Battle of Walcourt in August 1689 and is listed in the 1691 return as a "Fusilier" regiment, a designation reserved for elite units.

O'Farrell was captured by a French patrol in July 1692 but was quickly released since he was present at the Battle of Steenkerque in August and also fought at Landen in 1693. However, in July 1695 as commander of the garrison at Deinze he surrendered it to the French without resistance, the town of Diksmuide doing the same. Prisoners were normally exchanged as soon as possible but the French retained the 6,000 - 7,000 troops captured at Diksmuide and Deinze due to a dispute over the terms of their surrender. Shortage of manpower was becoming an issue and the French used a various methods to encourage prisoners to enlist in their army, including moving officers and men into prison cells; O'Farrell wrote to a friend on 5 September complaining of this treatment.

William dealt harshly with the officers from Deinze and Diksmuide; Ellenberg was executed in Ghent on 30 November, O'Farrell dismissed and those who signed the surrender documents court-martialled. Most were quickly reinstated, including O'Farrell who was reappointed in 1696, although he lost command of his regiment. During the War of the Spanish Succession in January 1704, he was promoted Major General, and according to Parliamentary records was one of a number of general officers assigned to the army of John V of Portugal, a position he retained until December 1708. He died in 1712.

== Sources ==
- Cannon, Richard (1849). Historical Record of the Twenty-First Regiment, or the Royal North British Fusiliers (2015 ed.). Sagwan Press. ISBN 1340166801.
- Childs, John (1991). The Nine Years' War and the British Army, 1688-97. Manchester University Press. ISBN 978-0719089961.
- Dalton, Charles (1904). English army lists and commission registers, 1661-1714 Volume IV. Eyre and Spottiswood.
- Dalton, Charles (1906). English army lists and commission registers, 1661-1714 Volume V. Eyre and Spottiswood.
- Doyle, James William Edmund (1885). The Official Baronage of England. Longmans, Green.
- Walton, Clifford (1894). History of the British Standing Army; 1660 to 1700 (2012 ed.). Nabu Press. ISBN 1149754761.

Military offices
| Preceded by Thomas Buchan | Colonel of The Royal Scots Fusiliers; 1689–1695 | Succeeded by Robert Mackay |
