= Thomas Buchan =

Scottish professional soldier (c. 1641–1724)

- Born: ca 1641; Logie-Buchan, Aberdeenshire Scotland
- Died: 1724 (aged 82–83); Fyvie
- Burial place: Logie-Buchan
- Military career
- Allegiance: France 1668–1678; Dutch Republic 1678–1682; Scotland 1682–1688; Jacobite 1689–1692
- Service years: 1668–1692
- Rank: Major General
- Units: Dumbarton's Regiment 1668–1678; Dutch Scots Brigade 1678–1682; Earl of Mar's Regiment 1682–1688
- Commands: Jacobite military commander in Scotland 1690–1692
- Conflicts: Franco-Dutch War 1672–78; Argyll's Rising 1685; Williamite War in Ireland 1689–1690; Jacobite Rising Scotland 1690–92

Thomas Buchan (c.1641–1724) was a Scottish professional soldier from a Catholic family in Aberdeenshire who served in the armies of France, the Netherlands and Scotland. He remained loyal to James II after the 1688 Glorious Revolution and participated in the War in Ireland before taking command of Jacobite forces in Scotland in February 1690. After the Highland chiefs submitted to William III in early 1692, he was given safe passage to France and later allowed to return home in 1703. He maintained links with the Stuart exiles and played a small role in the 1715 Rising but escaped punishment and died at Fyvie in 1724.

== Life ==
Thomas Buchan was the third son of James Buchan of Auchmacoy in Aberdeenshire and Margaret, daughter of Alexander Seton of Pitmedden, both members of the tiny Scottish Catholic minority. (Note: Some sources incorrectly refer to Buchan as Irish.) The intersections between family relationships and politics were extremely complex in this period; his younger brother, John Buchan of Cairnbulg became a Colonel in the army of William III, which required him to be a Protestant. (Note: The 1681 Test Act required all holders of military or political posts to swear an oath to uphold the Protestant religion, effectively barring Catholics.) Conversely, one of his nephews, James Buchan of Auchmacoy (ca 1675–1726) served as an officer in the Jacobite and French armies, while the eldest, Alexander, became a Jesuit.

In 1703, he was allowed to return home under a general amnesty; in 1704, he married Elizabeth (fl. 1660–1710), widow of Sir George Gordon, Ninth Laird of Gight and sister of a friend and former colleague, Adam Urquhart of Meldrum. They had no children and Elizabeth died in 1710.

== Career ==
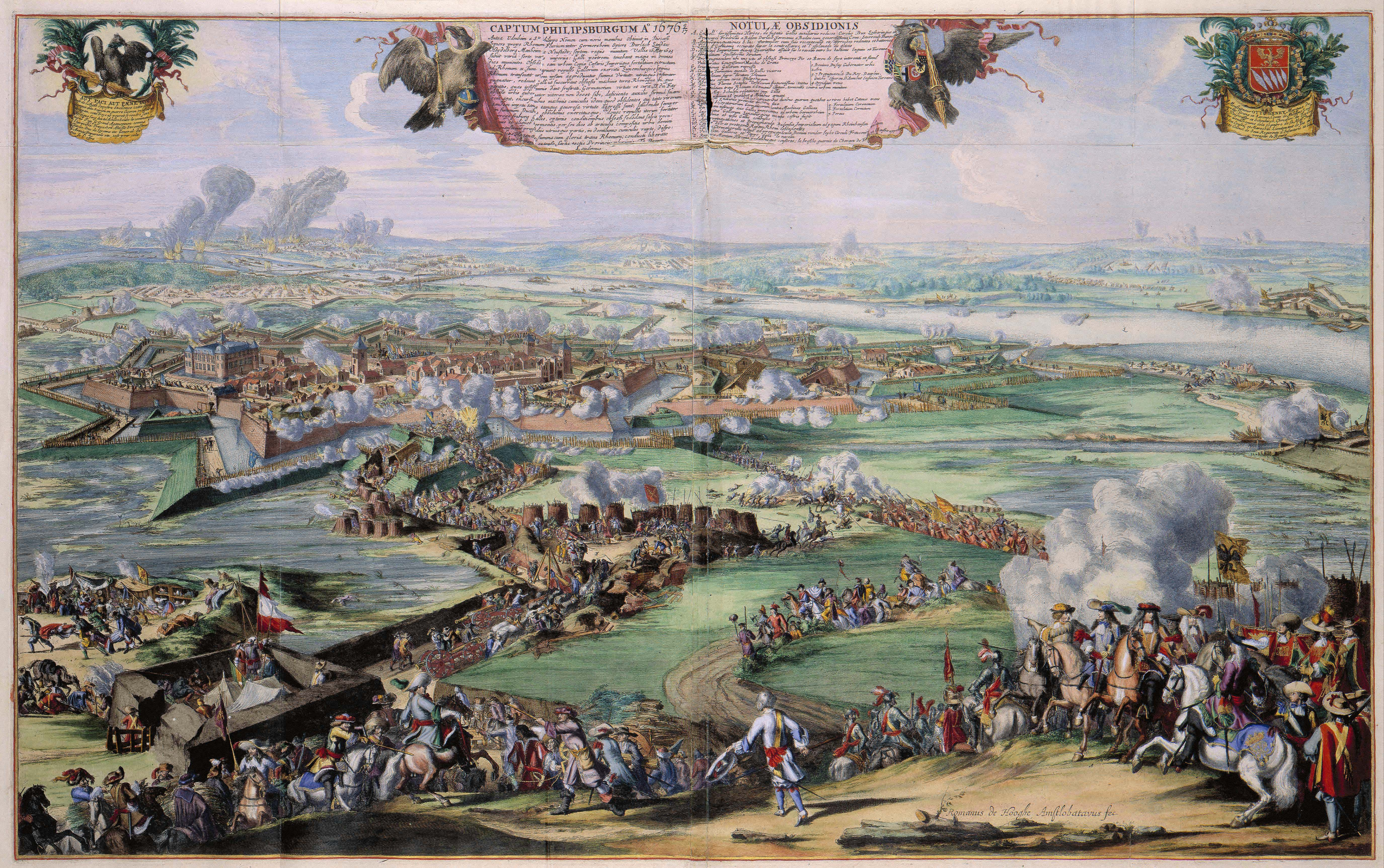
Philippsburg 1676; Dumbarton's Regiment was part of the French relief force.

Like other Scots who chose a military career, lack of a regular standing army meant taking service abroad and in 1668 Buchan was commissioned in the 'Régiment de Douglas,' a long-standing Scottish mercenary unit. Douglas' was commanded by another Scots Catholic, George Douglas, later Earl of Dumbarton and served primarily with the French army from 1633 to 1678, including the 1672-78 Franco-Dutch War. When it ended in 1678, Buchan and his brother John moved to another longstanding mercenary unit, the Dutch Scots Brigade, commanded by Hugh Mackay. Many Brigade officers were Scottish or English political exiles, and Buchan later claimed he was instructed to join by James in order to balance this.

Buchan returned to Scotland in 1682 when he was appointed to the Earl of Mars' Regiment, later the Royal Scots Fusiliers; he helped defeat Argyll's Rising in June 1685 and was promoted Colonel in July 1686. His brother John remained with the Scots Brigade, fought for the government at the battle of Killiecrankie in 1689, was promoted to Colonel and served William III in Flanders between 1691 and 1697.

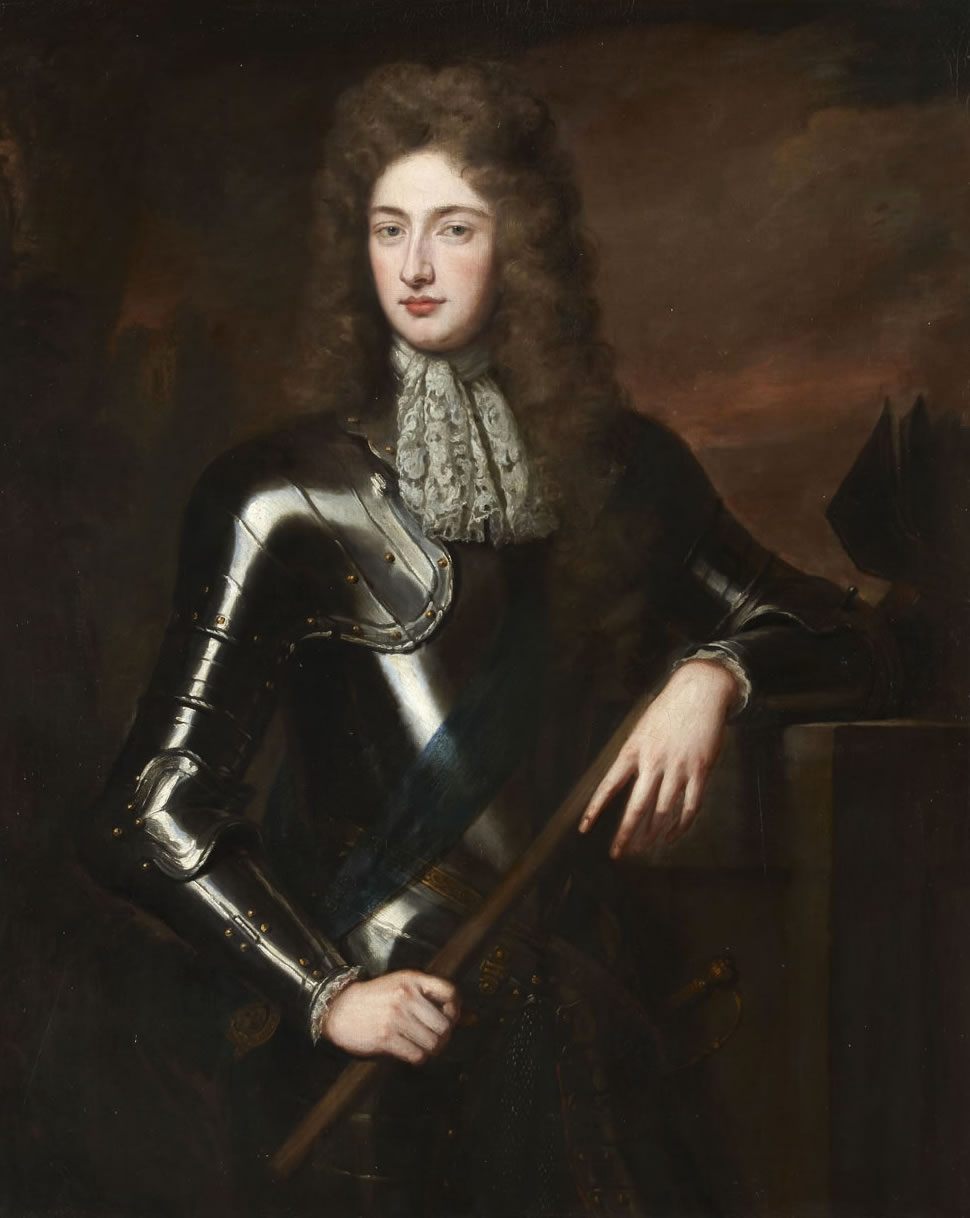
Buchan asked that the Duke of Berwick be sent to lead the 1690 campaign

When William landed at Torbay in November 1688 in what is now known as the Glorious Revolution, the bulk of the Scots army joined James at Salisbury in England; by this time, Buchan was listed as a Brigadier. The vast majority defected to William, but Buchan remained loyal like most Catholic officers and accompanied James first into exile and then to Ireland in 1689. (Note: Francis O'Farrell took over Buchan's former regiment on 1 March 1689; he had been in Dutch service with William and served in Flanders from 1689-95. He was cashiered in 1695 for surrendering the town of Deinze but later reinstated.) He was selected to go to Scotland in July 1689 to 'assist' Dundee but was needed for the siege of Derry; Alexander Cannon, another colleague from the Scots Brigade went instead. (Note: This was part of the internal struggle between Catholic Non-Compounders who urged James to refuse any concessions to regain his throne and Protestant Compounders for whom they were essential; as Scots Catholics, Buchan and Cannon were considered more suitable than Dundee by the Non-Compounders who dominated the Jacobite agenda.) Cannon took over after Dundee's death in July 1689 at the battle of Killiecrankie but in February 1690 Buchan arrived in Scotland to assume command.

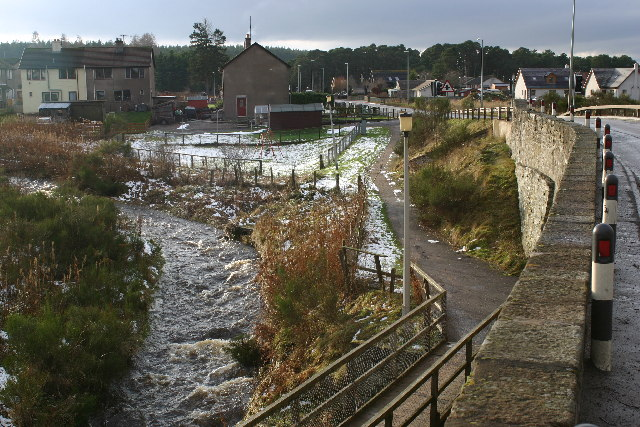
Modern Cromdale, site of Buchan's defeat in 1690

The strategic issue facing all Jacobite commanders, whether Dundee, Cannon or Buchan was that a Scottish rising needed external support and thus access to a port. This in turn meant siege equipment and skills not common in a force primarily composed of Highlanders; without them, the only option was a low level guerrilla war that inevitably placed the main burden on the civilian population. Mackay kept up the pressure through the winter of 1689/90 by capturing strongholds like Blair Castle and building fortifications like Fort William while extremely harsh weather conditions led to severe food shortages.

This prevented the Jacobites from assembling significant forces for the 1690 campaign; in March, Buchan and Lochiel wrote to James requesting money, weapons plus 4,000-foot and 1,000 cavalry led by James' illegitimate son the Duke of Berwick. Resupply on this scale was unrealistic while the request for so substantial a figure as Berwick reflected the lack of support from senior Scottish regional magnates. Buchan raised about 1,200 men but this was soon reduced to less than 700 and on 1 May 1690 his forces were taken by surprise and scattered at the Battle of Cromdale.

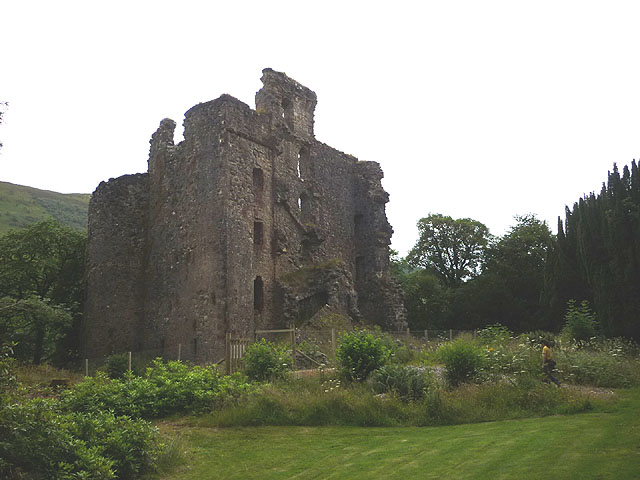
The ruins of Invergarry Castle, in Lochaber; Buchan, Cannon and other Jacobite officers stayed here until March 1692

Buchan and others escaped and retraced the route taken by Cannon the previous year into Aberdeenshire, an area dominated by the Catholic Gordons and an Episcopalian and Royalist stronghold since the 1630s. It contained significant pockets of supporters including clansmen loyal to Colonel John Farquharson based at Inverey Castle; Buchan managed to assemble several hundred men but lacked the means to attack Aberdeen itself and his forces once again dwindled away.

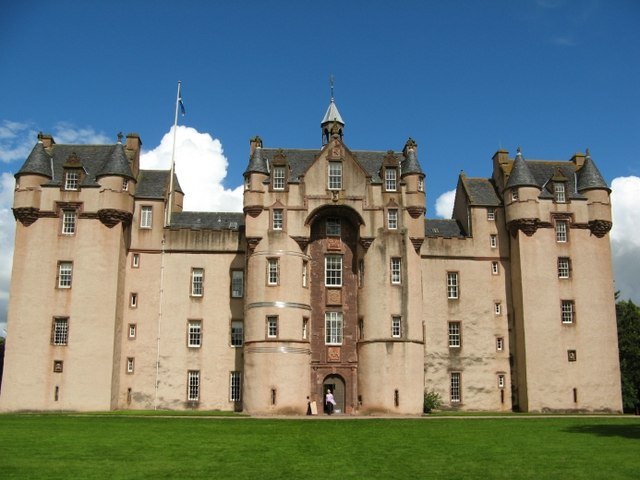
Fyvie; inherited from his wife Elizabeth, Buchan died here in 1724

Effective Jacobite resistance ceased with the surrender of Kenneth Mackenzie, 4th Earl of Seaforth and Buchan took refuge in Lochaber where he was sheltered by the MacDonald chief Glengarry. After the submission of the Highland chiefs in December 1691, he and others including Alexander Cannon were given safe conduct to France in March 1692.

Buchan carried the blame for the failure of the 1690 campaign and never held command again; in 1703, he was allowed to return home under a general amnesty but remained in contact with the exiled Stuarts and in 1707 surveyed the defences of Inverness at the request of Jacobite agent Nathaniel Hooke. Jacobite politician and agent George Lockhart mentions Buchan in his journals for 1708 as one of a number of Scottish Catholics asked to assist in preparations for the failed 1708 invasion. He offered his services during the 1715 Jacobite rising and was briefly forced into exile again before returning home in 1717. He died at his wife's home of Fyvie in 1724.

== Family ==
In 1704, Buchan married Elizabeth Urquhart, widow of Sir George Gordon, 9th of Gight, another member of the Catholic minority. She died in 1710 and they had no children.

== Bibliography ==
- Black, Jeremy; Britain as a Military Power, 1688-1815 (1998 Routledge);
- Childs, John; The Williamite Wars in Ireland (2008 Bloomsbury);
- Glozier, Matthew; Scottish Soldiers in France in the Reign of the Sun King (2004, Brill Publishing);
- Lenman, Bruce; The Jacobite Risings in Britain, 1689-1746 (1985 Scottish Cultural Press);
- Mann, Alastair; James VII: Duke and King of Scots, 1633–1701 (2014, John Donald Short Run Press);
- Robertson, Barry; Royalists at War in Scotland and Ireland, 1638–1650 (2014 Routledge);
- Szechi, Daniel; The Jacobites: Britain and Europe, 1688–1788 (1994 Manchester University Press);
- Terry, Charles; Jacobites and the Union: Being A Narrative of the Movements of 1708, 1715, 1719 (1922 Cambridge University Press).

Military offices
Previous: Charles Erskine, Earl of Mar	Colonel of the Scots Fuzileers; 1686–1689	Succeeded by Francis Fergus O'Farrell
