= Charles de Montsaulnin, Comte de Montal =

17th century French military officer and noble

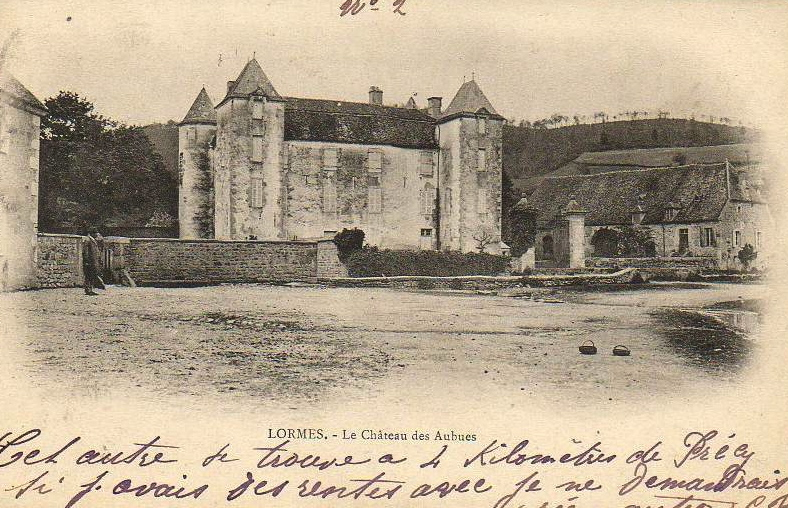
- Chateau des Aubues, Montal's family home

Governor of Maritime Flanders
- In office 1693–1696

Governor of Mont-Royal
- In office 1687–1692

Governor of Maubeuge and Dinant
- In office 1678–1684

Governor of Charleroi
- In office 1668–1678

Personal details
- Born: 1619 Château des Aubues, near Lormes, Nivernais
- Died: 21 September 1696 (aged 77) Dunkirk
- Resting place: Saint-Brisson, Nièvre
- Spouse: Gabrielle de Solage de Frédault (1634–?)
- Children: Louis (1648–1686); François-Ignace (ca 1650–1691); François (1653–1672); Cassandre-Marie (? – 1695)
- Occupation: Soldier
- Awards: Order of the Holy Spirit 1688

Military service
- Years of service: 1638-1696
- Rank: Lieutenant General
- Battles/wars: Thirty Years War; Freiburg; Nördlingen; The Fronde; Franco-Spanish War (1635–1659); Valenciennes; The Dunes; War of Devolution 1667–1668; War of the Reunions 1683–1684; Franco-Dutch War; Maastricht; Seneffe; Saint-Denis; Nine Years' War; Steenkerque; Diksmuide

Charles de Montsaulnin, Comte de Montal, c. 1619 to 1696, was a French military officer and noble from Nivernais. A close friend of Le Grand Condé, his military career began in 1638 and he subsequently fought in many of the wars of Louis XIV.

During the Fronde, he was one of the few to follow Condé into exile in Spain. Pardoned by Louis XIV in 1659, he was particularly well-regarded for his defensive expertise, and worked for many years with French military engineer Vauban, a neighbour from the same region.

Montal served as Governor of a number of key towns, including Charleroi, occupied by France from 1668 to 1678 and now in Belgium. 'Rue Montal' was named after him by the city council in 1860.

== Personal details ==
Charles de Montsaulnin was born in 1619, only surviving son of Adrien de Montsaulnin, Comte de Montal (ca 1590 to 1632) and Gabrielle de Rabutin. He had three sisters, Claude (sic, died 1697), Adrienne and Elisabeth (died after 1660). The family home was the 15th century Château des Aubues, near Lormes in Nièvre, which was demolished in the late 19th century and little trace of it remains today.

In 1640, he married Gabrielle de Solage de Frédault (1634–?); they had four surviving children, three sons and a daughter. The eldest, Louis (1648–1686), joined his father's regiment in 1667, fought with him in Flanders and died of disease in Paris; his son, Charles-Louis de Montsaulnin (? – 1758) became de Montal's heir.

Of their other children, François-Ignace (ca 1650–1691) died of wounds received at Landau, while François (1653–1672) joined the Knights of Malta, fought in Crete when only 15 and was killed in Flanders in 1672. His daughter Cassandre-Marie (? – 1695) married François-Eustache, Comte de Druy, whose family were neighbours in Nièvre.

== Career ==
The first half of the 17th century in France was a period of intense internal and external conflict. A series of Huguenot rebellions broke out in the 1620s, while French support for the Protestant Dutch Republic in its rebellion against Catholic Spain led to the 1635–1659 Franco-Spanish War. Montal began his military career in 1638 as a captain in the regiment of the duc d'Enghien, later the Grand Condé, the leading French general of the period. He took part in the 1639 capture of the Spanish border fortress of Salses-le-Château, but the French were forced to retreat in 1640 after Condé's army disintegrated.

He then joined Turenne during his Rhineland campaign of 1644–1646, fighting at the battles of Freiburg and Nördlingen. The end of the Thirty Years War in 1648 led to a struggle for political control between powerful nobles including Condé, Turenne and his brother the Duc de Bouillon, and a Court party headed by Anne of Austria, mother of the 8 year old Louis XIV, and Cardinal Mazarin. This triggered a civil war known as the Fronde, although the defection of Turenne in 1651 and the Battle of the Faubourg St Antoine in July 1652 ended it as a serious threat to the French state.

Montal was one of the few who followed Condé into an alliance with Spain in September 1652; possessed of enormous wealth, Condé effectively ruled large parts of Bourgogne-Franche-Comté as an independent state, with his capital at Sainte-Menehould. Montal was appointed garrison commander when the town was fortified in 1652, one of the junior engineers being a 19 year old Vauban. Neighbours from the same district in Nievre, this began a relationship that lasted many years, although Vauban changed sides in early 1653 when captured by Royalists besieging the town. Montal surrendered in November 1653, allegedly in return for a payment of 50,000 pistoles.

Northern France and the Spanish Netherlands; key locations of Montal's career

Given free passage to Spanish territory, he was made governor of Rocroi and later fought in the 1656 Battle of Valenciennes, a crushing defeat inflicted by Condé on a French army led by Turenne. The 1659 Treaty of the Pyrenees that ended the war with Spain was delayed until Mazarin agreed to allow Montal and Condé to return home unpunished. Neither of them was trusted with a military command until the 1667-1668 War of Devolution; Montal served with Condé when he over-ran Franche-Comté in 1668, although it was returned to Spain in the Treaty of Aix-la-Chapelle.

However, the treaty allowed France to retain strategic areas along their border with the Spanish Netherlands, including Charleroi whose fortifications were upgraded by Vauban. Now fully rehabilitated, Montal was appointed Governor, a position he retained until 1678; during the Franco-Dutch War in June 1673, he took part in the assault on the key Dutch town of Maastricht. Later the same year he repulsed an attempt by William of Orange to take Charleroi and was wounded at Seneffe in 1674. During the winter of 1676/1677, he supported a tight French blockade of the Spanish-held towns of Valenciennes and Cambrai by seizing any grain being transported from Namur and preventing reinforcements reaching either garrison.

Active campaigning in Flanders largely ended after the two towns surrendered in spring 1677 but de Montal was involved in the last action of the war, the Battle of Saint-Denis in August 1678. In return for his service, he was appointed Governor of the newly acquired towns of Dinant and Maubeuge, when Charleroi was returned to Spain in the 1678 Treaty of Nijmegen. The 1683–1684 War of the Reunions was short but relatively brutal, since Louvois, French Minister of War, sought to pressure the local populace into suing for peace by destroying crops and buildings. As Governor of Maubeuge, de Montal was ordered to burn 20 villages around Charleroi in retaliation for Spanish raids into France.

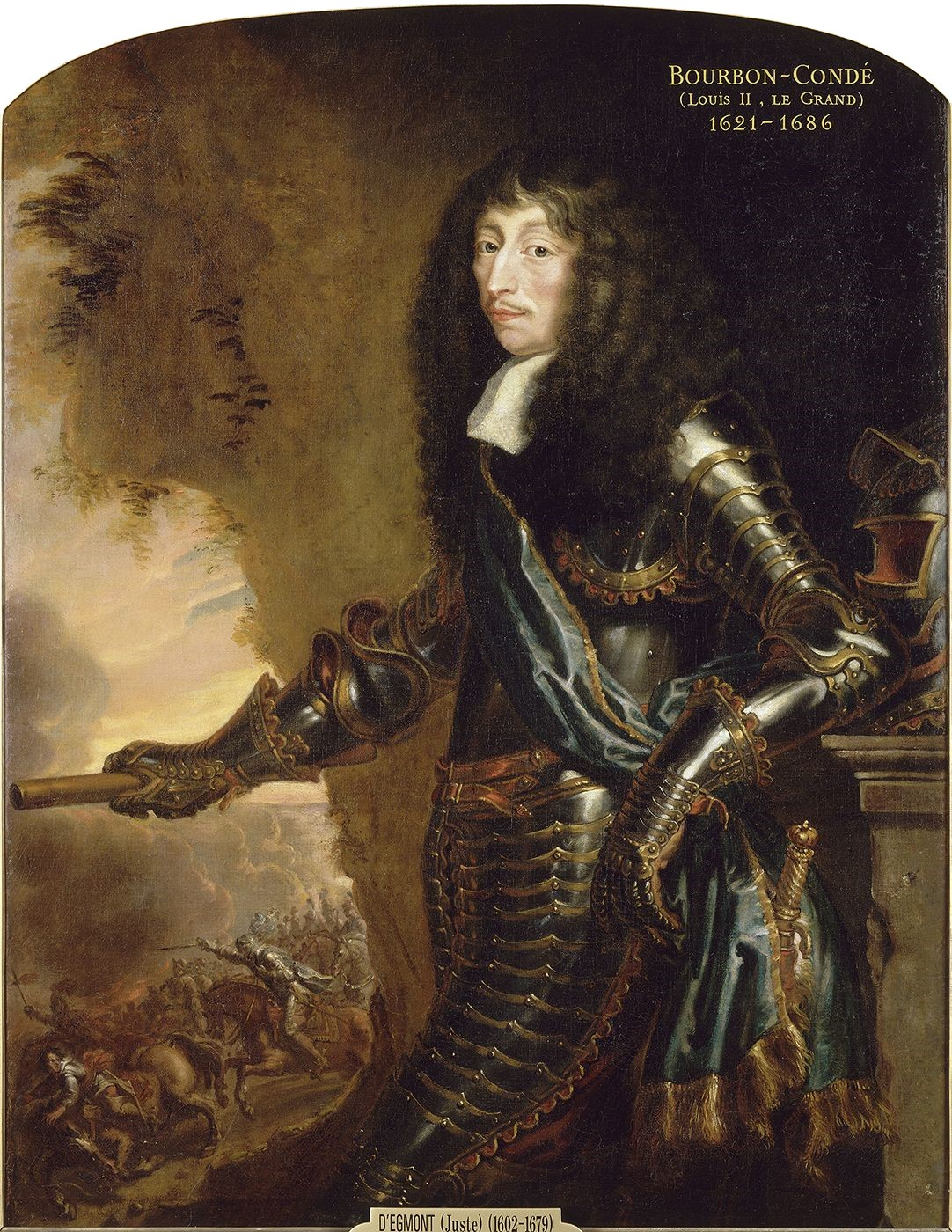
Louis, Prince of Condé (1621–1686); Montal served with him throughout his career, including during the 1650–1653 Fronde des nobles

Louis XIV once reportedly remarked sieges should ideally be conducted by Vauban and defended by de Montal, but could only happen once, since they would kill each other. His confidence in their abilities was demonstrated in 1687 when Vauban was ordered to construct a new fortress called Mont-Royal, with Montal as Governor. Located on the Moselle, near Traben-Trarbach in modern Germany, Mont-Royal provided a vital stepping-off point for French offensives into the Rhineland. Built 200 metres above the Moselle, its main walls 30 metres high, three kilometres long and with space for 12,000 troops, it was enormously expensive but demolished when France withdrew after the 1697 Treaty of Ryswick.

Despite his age, de Montal held a number of commands in Flanders during the 1688–1697 Nine Years War and was instrumental in rallying the French infantry when they were taken by surprise at Steenkerque in 1692. Although he was promoted to Lieutenant-General in 1676, he never became a Marshall of France; it is suggested this was due to his defence of Sainte-Menehould in 1653, a siege conducted by Louis XIV himself. The title was largely ceremonial but de Montal complained about his exclusion from the list of promotions in 1693 and Louis appointed him commander of French forces in Maritime Flanders, based at Dunkirk.

By this stage of the war, Maritime Flanders was a quiet sector and one of his last actions was the capture of Diksmuide in 1695. He died at Dunkirk on 19 September 1696 and was buried at Saint-Brisson in the family vault, destroyed in the French Revolution.

== Sources ==
- Birch, Thomas (1742). A Collection of the State Papers of John Thurloe. Thomas Woodward, Paternoster Row.;
- Black, Jeremy (2009). The Cambridge Illustrated Atlas of Warfare: Renaissance to Revolution; Volume 2. Cambridge University Press. ISBN 978-0521470339.;
- Childs, John (2014). General Percy Kirke and the Later Stuart Army. Bloomsbury Academic. ISBN 978-1474255141.;
- De Blancourt, Haudicquer (1710). Recherches historiques de l'Ordre du S. Esprit, Volume 2. Claude Jombert, Paris. pp. 368–370.;
- De Courcillon, Phillipe (1825). Memoirs of the Court of France; 1684–1720. Henry Colman.;
- Duffy, Christopher (1995). Siege Warfare: The Fortress in the Early Modern World 1494–1660. Routledge. ISBN 978-0415146494.;
- Everard, Jean (1959). Monographie des rues de Charleroi. Collins.;
- Lynn, John (1993). "How War Fed War: The Tax of Violence and Contributions during the Grand Siècle". The Journal of Modern History. 65 (2): 286–310. doi:10.1086/244639. S2CID 153454205.
- Menetreux-le-pitois. "Famille De Montsaulnin". Menetreux-le-pitois.
- Moreri, Louis (1749). Le grand dictionnaire historique ou Le melange curieux de l'Histoire sacrée; Volume I. Libraires Associes, Paris.
- Parrot, David (2008). Richelieu's Army: War, Government and Society in France, 1624–1642. Cambridge University Press. ISBN 978-0521025485.
- Patrimoine du Morvan. "Chateau des Aubues". Patrimoine du Morvan.
- Phillipson, Coleman (1916). Termination Of War And Treaties Of Peace (2010 ed.). The Lawbook Exchange. ISBN 1584778601.
- Satterfield, George (2003). Princes, Posts and Partisans: The Army of Louis XIV and Partisan Warfare in the Netherlands (1673–1678). Brill. ISBN 978-9004131767.
- Traben-Tarbach Tourist Information. "Fortress Mont Royal". Traben-Tarbach Tourist Information.
- Tucker, Spencer C (2009). A Global Chronology of Conflict: From the Ancient World to the Modern Middle East 6V: A Global Chronology of Conflict [6 volumes]. ABC-CLIO. ISBN 978-1851096671.;

French nobility
Preceded by Adrien de Montsaulnin	Comte de Montal; 1632–1696	Succeeded by Charles-Louis de Montsaulnin
