= Siege of Maastricht (1676) =

1676 siege and failed capture of Maastricht

- Part of the Franco-Dutch War
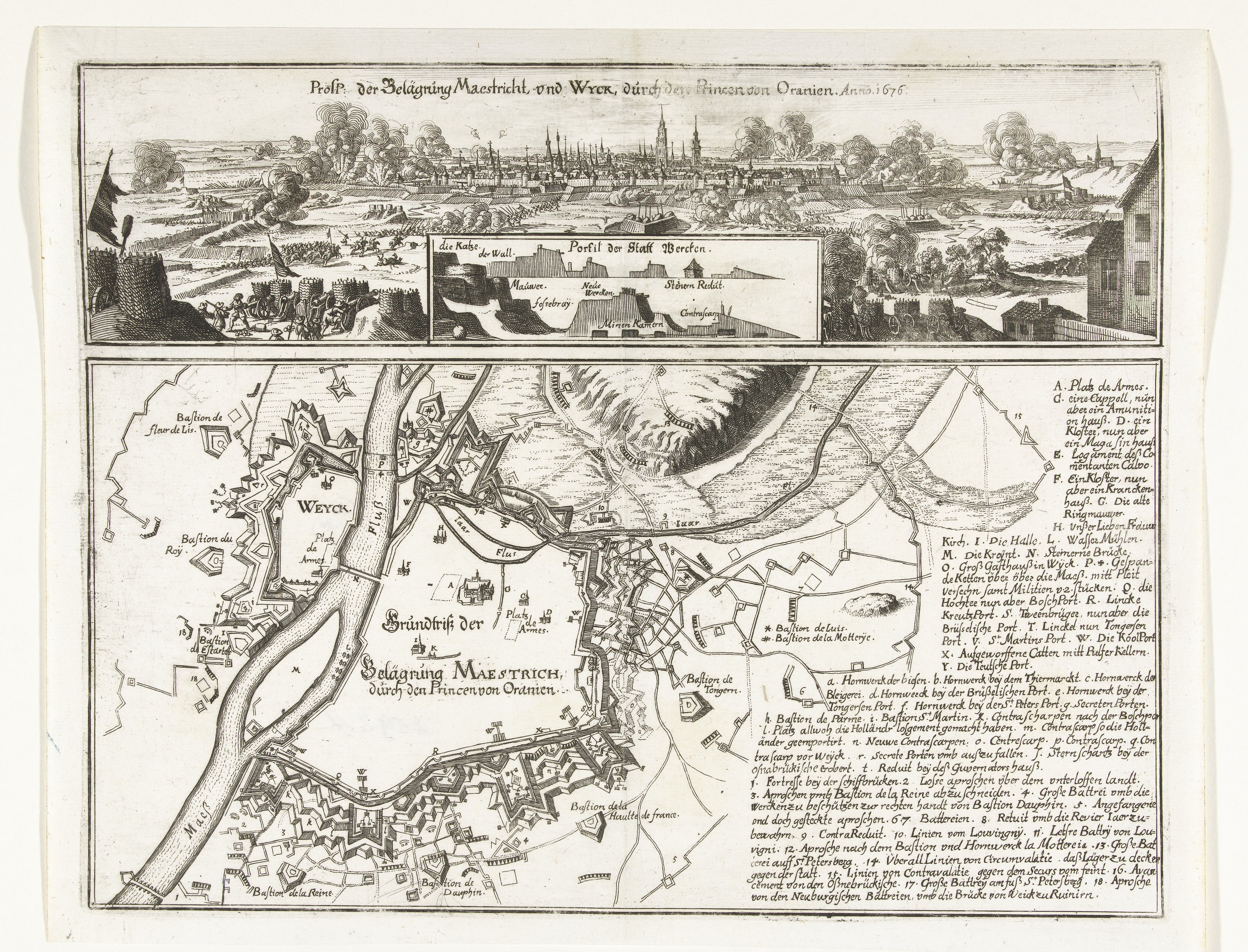
- 1676 Siege of Maastricht
Date	6 July – 27 August 1676
Location	Maastricht, Dutch Republic
Result	French victory

Belligerents
Kingdom of France	Dutch Republic; Spain

Commanders and leaders
(Kingdom of France) François de Calvo	(Dutch Republic) William III of Orange (Dutch Republic) Waldeck (Dutch Republic) Karel Florentine † (Spain) Louvignies (Spain) Villahermosa

Strength
7,000 infantry	25,000 infantry

Casualties and losses
Unknown	Several thousand

The Siege of Maastricht (1676) took place from 6 July to 27 August 1676 during the 1672 to 1678 Franco-Dutch War. A combined Dutch-Spanish army led by William III of Orange unsuccessfully tried to retake Maastricht, which the French had captured in 1673. It was eventually returned to the Dutch under the terms of the 1678 Treaty of Nijmegen.

== Background ==
In the 1667-1668 War of Devolution, France captured most of the Spanish Netherlands but the Triple Alliance of the Dutch Republic, England and Sweden forced them to relinquish most of these gains in the Treaty of Aix-la-Chapelle. In response, Louis XIV paid Sweden large subsidies in return for remaining neutral in any new war with the Dutch, while Charles II of England agreed to support France in the 1670 Secret Treaty of Dover.

When France invaded the Dutch Republic in May 1672, alliances with Münster and the Electorate of Cologne allowed them to bypass border defences in the Spanish Netherlands. They seemed to have achieved an overwhelming victory, but the Dutch States Army withdrew behind the Dutch Water Line and opened the sluices on 22 June, flooding the land and preventing further advances. On 4 July, William of Orange was appointed Stadtholder and repelled an invasion force from Münster, recapturing most of the territory lost in June.

The campaign in Flanders 1672-1678; key locations in the Spanish Netherlands and Dutch Republic. Note: the map shows the present-day borders

By late July, the Dutch position had stabilised, while concern at French gains brought them support from Frederick William of Brandenburg-Prussia, Emperor Leopold and Charles II of Spain. In August, Johan and Cornelis de Witt, whose policies were blamed for the Dutch collapse, were lynched by an Orangist mob, leaving William in control. Louis was now forced into another war of attrition around the French frontiers, with an Imperial army opening a new front in the Rhineland.

Until the advent of railways in the 19th century, goods and supplies were largely transported by water, making rivers like the Lys, Sambre and Meuse vital for trade and military operations. In June 1673, the French took Maastricht, which controlled a key access point on the Meuse but the Dutch recaptured Naarden in September 1673, while Münster and Cologne left the war in November. This was followed in early 1674 by Denmark joining the Alliance and England agreeing peace with the Dutch in the Treaty of Westminster. The French were now over-extended and withdrew from the Dutch Republic, retaining only Grave and Maastricht. Grave was recaptured by the Dutch in 1674.

== Siege ==
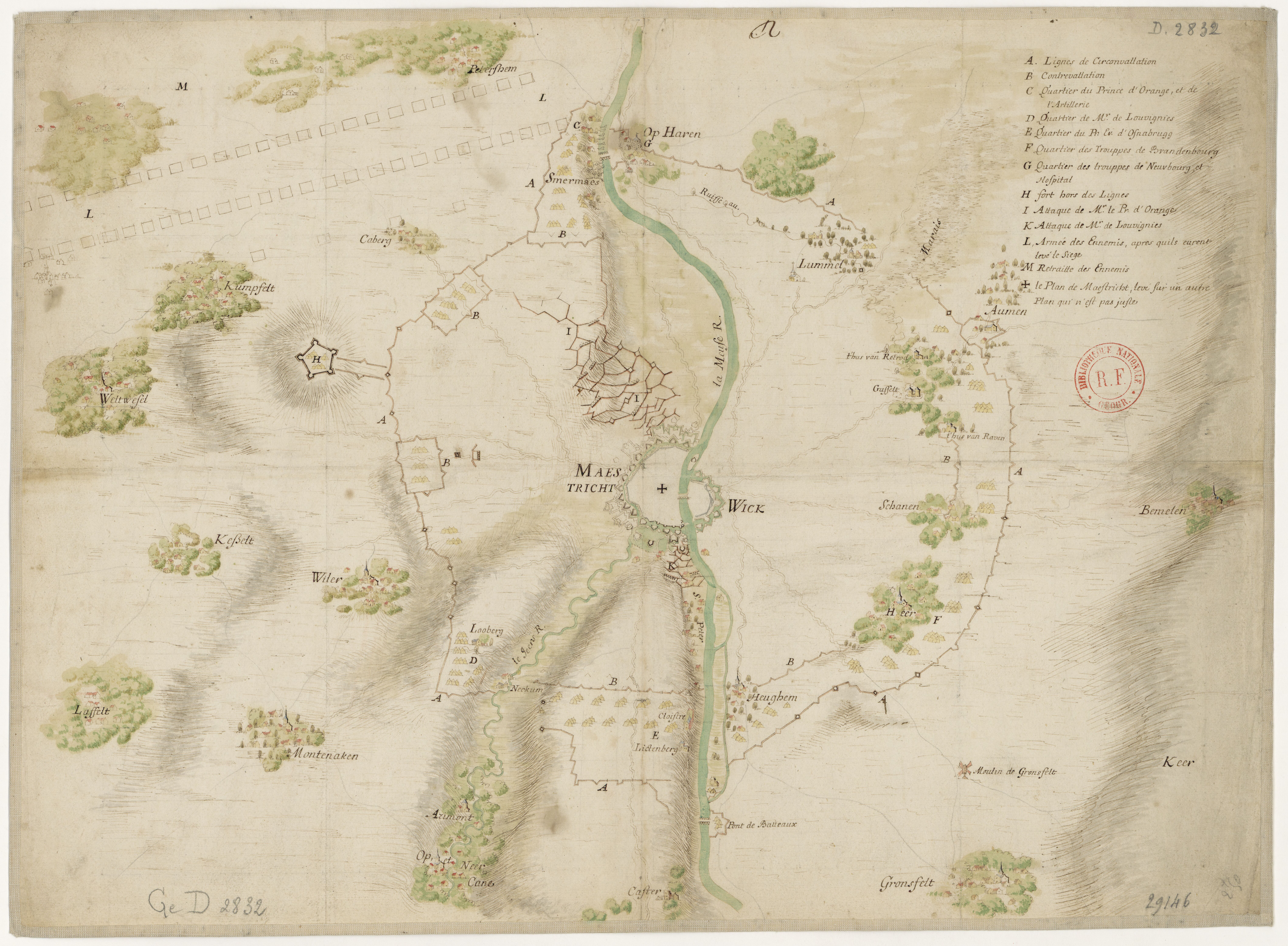
Map of 1676 with the circumvallation lines (A), the contravallation (B), and the camps of the Prince of Orange (C), the Marquis of Louvignies (D), the Prince-Bishop of Osnabrück (E), the Brandenburg forces (F), and those of the Palatinate-Neuburg (G)

In summer 1676, William III decided to attack Maastricht with a combined Dutch-Spanish army, led respectively by his deputy Waldeck and Villahermosa, Governor of the Habsburg Netherlands. On 3 July, these troops assembled near Nivelles before marching on Maastricht, which they reached three days later. Also present were troops from England, Osnabrück, Brandenburg and the Palatinate-Neuburg. The combined forces started work on the investment of the heavily-fortified town, building both circumvallation and contravallation lines on both sides of the river Meuse.

The first assault was delayed until July 21, and focused on the what was considered the weakest portion of the city defences, the Bossche Fronten near the Bosch Gate (see Map, I). During the attacks in late July and August, the Dutch forces suffered a thousand casualties, including Karel Florentine, lieutenant general of the infantry, who died of wounds. Meanwhile, the Marquis of Louvignies, commander of the Army of Flanders, focussed his attack on the southern defenses, near the village of Sint Pieter (see map, K).

On 17 August, William was given a letter by Meinhardt Schomberg, which had been sent to the commander of the fortress, and had been intercepted. The letter was informing the commander that a French relief column was on their way to break up the siege. William met with Waldeck at Tongeren, also present were the Prince-Bishop of Osnabrück, the Marquis of Louvignies, as well as military officers from Spain and Austria. The siege continued, with the allied forces continuing to attempt to outflank the garrison through the suburb of Wyck on August 23. However, with the impending arrival of the French relief column, the siege was abandoned on August 27.

Reasons for the failure of the siege varied. Some blamed weak command skills of the Dutch, while others thought it was due to a lack of support from William's allies. Another theory was that the low water level of the river Meuse, made the supply of water for the Dutch forces inadequate.

== Bibliography ==
- Childs, John (1991). The Nine Years' War and the British Army, 1688-1697: The Operations in the Low Countries. MUP. ISBN 0719089964.;
- Davenport, Frances (1917). "European Treaties bearing on the History of the United States and its Dependencies". Washington, D.C. Carnegie Institution of Washington. p. 238.
- Lynn, John (1999). The Wars of Louis XIV, 1667-1714 (Modern Wars In Perspective). Longman. ISBN 978-0582056299.
- Morreau, L. J. (1979). Bolwerk der Nederlanden (in Dutch). Van Gorcum. ISBN 90-232-1698-9.
- Muller, P. L. (1880). "De veldtocht van Willem III in 1676". De Gids (in Dutch). 44: 44–75.
- Panhuysen, Luc (2009). Rampjaar 1672: Hoe de Republiek aan de ondergang ontsnapte (in Dutch). Uitgeverij Atlas. ISBN 9789045013282.
- Smith, Rhea (1965). Spain; A Modern History. University of Michigan Press. ISBN 978-0472071500.
- Ubachs, P. J. H.; Evers, I. M. H. (2005). Historische Encyclopedie Maastricht (in Dutch). Walburg Pers. ISBN 90-5730-399-X.
- Young, William (2004). International Politics and Warfare in the Age of Louis XIV and Peter the Great. iUniverse. ISBN 978-0595329922.
