= Siege of Maastricht (1673) =

Action during the Franco-Dutch War (1672–1678)

Coordinates: 50°51′N 5°41′E

- Part of the Franco-Dutch War
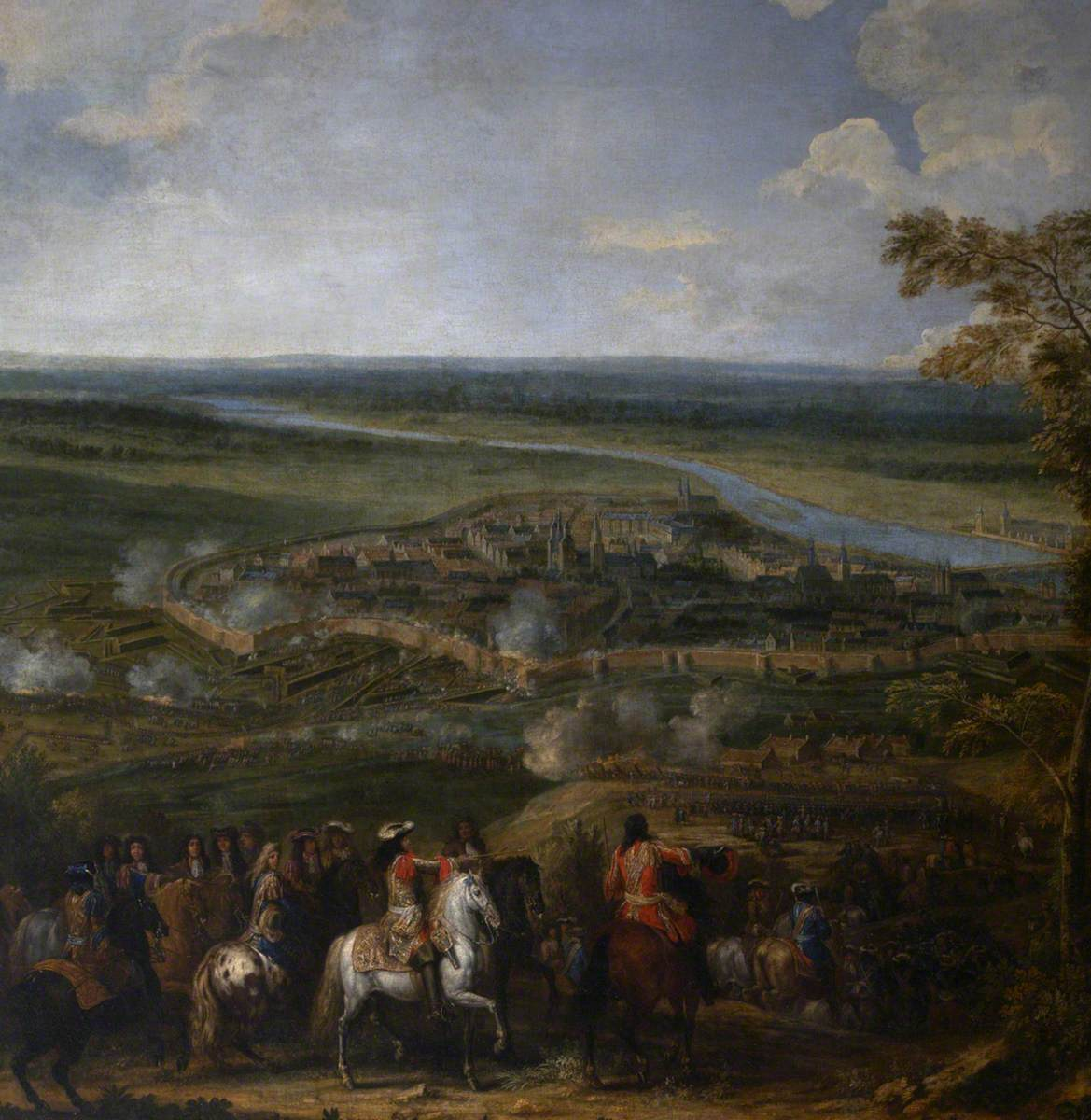
- Louis XIV in front of the besieged city.
Date	13–30 June 1673
Location	Maastricht, Dutch Republic
Result	Anglo-French victory

Belligerents
France; England	Dutch Republic

Commanders and leaders
(Kingdom of France) Louis XIV (Kingdom of France) Sebastien Vauban (Kingdom of France) Marquis de Montbrun (Kingdom of France) Comte de Montal (Kingdom of France) d'Artagnan † (England) Duke of Monmouth (England) John Churchill	(Dutch Republic) Jacques de Fariaux

Strength
24,000 infantry 16,000 cavalry 58 guns	5,000 infantry 1,200 cavalry

Casualties and losses
2,300+	1,700

The Siege of Maastricht, 13 to 30 June 1673, took place during the Franco-Dutch War, when a French army captured the strategic Dutch fortress of Maastricht on the Meuse river.

Siege operations were conducted by Vauban, and is thought to be the first use of a technique known as the "siege parallel", a concept that remained in use until the mid-20th century.

Although the Dutch failed to retake the city in 1676, it was returned under the terms of the 1678 Treaty of Nijmegen.

== Background ==
In the 1667–1668 War of Devolution, France captured much of the Spanish Netherlands and Franche-Comté, but relinquished these gains in the Treaty of Aix-la-Chapelle (1668). This was forced on Louis XIV of France by the Triple Alliance, composed of the Dutch Republic, England and Sweden. His response was to diplomatically isolate the Dutch before making another attempt, paying Sweden to remain neutral, and signing the Secret Treaty of Dover with Charles II of England in 1670.

When the French invaded the Dutch Republic in May 1672, they initially seemed to have achieved an overwhelming victory, capturing the major fortresses of Nijmegen and Fort Crèvecœur near 's-Hertogenbosch and occupying Utrecht without a fight. However, by late July, the Dutch Water Line had stabilised the front lines, while concern at French gains brought the Dutch support from Brandenburg-Prussia, Emperor Leopold and Charles II of Spain. Forced to divide his forces, in August Louis sent Turenne and 50,000 troops to the Rhineland.

Maastricht is located on the extreme eastern edge of the Flanders region, a compact area 160 kilometres wide, the highest point only 100 metres above sea level, and dominated by canals and rivers. Until the advent of railways in the 19th century, goods and supplies were primarily transported by water and campaigns fought over the control of rivers such as the Lys, Sambre and Meuse. Along with Sedan, Namur and Liège, Maastricht is one of a series of strategic fortress cities that control the Meuse valley and bridges over the river. Captured in 1632 from the Habsburgs by Dutch stadtholder Frederick Henry of Orange, its fortifications were considerably expanded until 1645.

Its location on both banks of the Meuse made the town extremely important and it was one of the few garrisoned in peacetime. Dutch engineer Menno van Coehoorn began his career there in 1657, as a young Lieutenant in his father's company. Prior to the 1672 invasion, the French prepared forward supply bases in the Bishopric of Liège and the Dutch responded by concentrating 11,000 mercenaries in Maastricht. They hoped that a prolonged siege would gain them sufficient time to prepare the six Rhine fortresses defending the eastern border of the Republic.

The campaign in Flanders 1672–1678. Key locations in the Spanish Netherlands and Dutch Republic

The French reached Maastricht on 17 May 1672. Louis wanted to capture the fortress first, but on advice of Turenne bypassed the main defences and only with ten thousand men occupied the satellites of Tongeren, Maaseik, and Valkenburg. This allowed him to overrun the Rhine fortresses and the entire Republic seemed on the verge of collapse before the Dutch managed to stabilise their position in August. The retention of Maastricht now allowed them to threaten the extended French supply lines. In November 1672, William III of Orange used it as a base for an attack on Charleroi, the French-held city at the start of their supply route, taking most of the garrison with him.

As a result, capturing Maastricht was made the primary objective for the French 1673 campaign. The army was accompanied by Louis XIV, for whom sieges were seen as a propaganda tool. While Louis assembled his forces around Kortrijk, another French army was concentrated in the west for a feint attack against Bruges, to prevent Spanish troops from further reinforcing Maastricht. While officially neutral, the Spanish Netherlands provided the Dutch with financial and diplomatic support, since their occupation was Louis' ultimate aim. The French opened the siege on 13 June.

== Advances in siege tactics ==
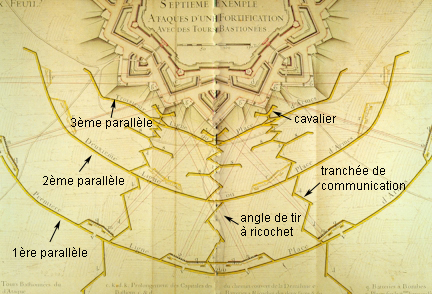
The siege parallel: three parallel trenches, linked by communication lines. The first is out of range of defensive fire, the third brings the attacking troops as close to the assault point as possible, while redoubts protect the ends of each.

Maastricht was the first siege where operations were directed by Vauban, although according to the custom of the time, he remained subordinate to the senior officer present, in this case Louis XIV. Louis had forbidden his generals de Condé or Turenne to be present at the siege to prevent them from sharing in the glory. The King regularly visited the trenches, exposing himself to enemy fire and was closely followed by painters and poets who had to immortalise his exploits for posterity, as well as the court historian Paul Pellisson.

Although commonly remembered for the fortifications he built, Vauban's greatest innovations were in the field of offensive operations. Some years previously his general principles were summarised in Mémoire pour servir d’instruction dans la conduite des sièges et dans la défense des places, published in 1740. This has provided modern researchers with some insights about the general principles Vauban probably applied. The 'siege parallel' had been in development since the mid-16th century but Maastricht saw him bring the idea to practical fulfilment.

Three parallel trenches were dug in front of the walls, connecting the perpendicular assault trenches, the earth thus excavated being used to create embankments screening the attackers from defensive fire, while bringing them as close to the assault point as possible (see Diagram). The transverse parallels allowed a much larger number of troops to participate simultaneously in an assault to overwhelm the defenders, while avoiding choking points that often had led to costly failures. Artillery was moved into the trenches, allowing them to target the base of the walls at close range, with the defenders unable to depress their own guns enough to counter this. Once a breach had been made, it was then stormed. This remained the standard for offensive operations until the early 20th century.

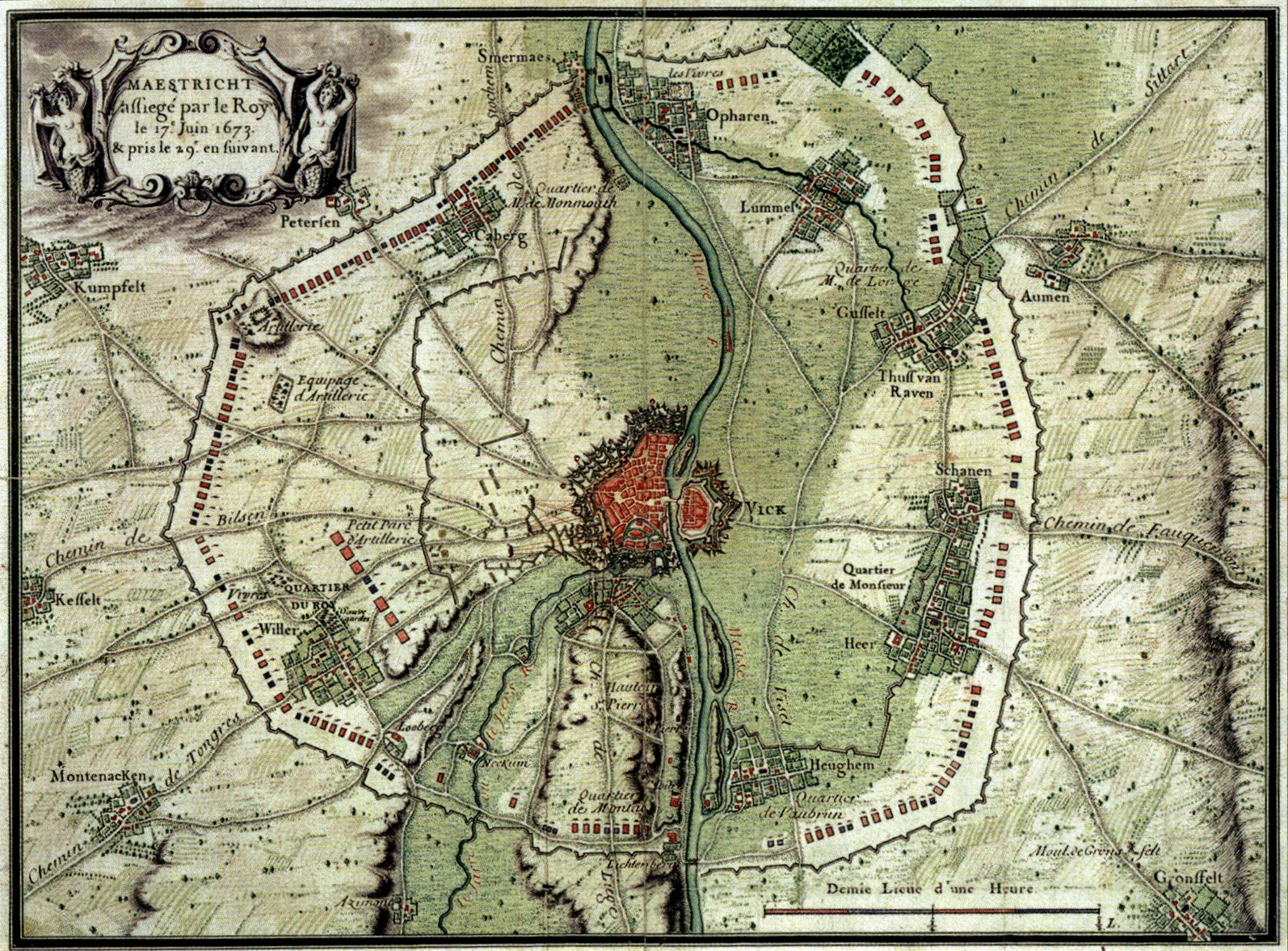
The circumvallation.

Vauban was unusually sympathetic to the impact of war on the poor, on one occasion requesting compensation be paid a man with eight children whose land was taken to build one of his forts. However, his siege works required large numbers of unpaid workers, with severe punishments for those who tried to evade service. 20,000 local farmers were conscripted to dig his trenches at Maastricht.

== Troop strengths ==
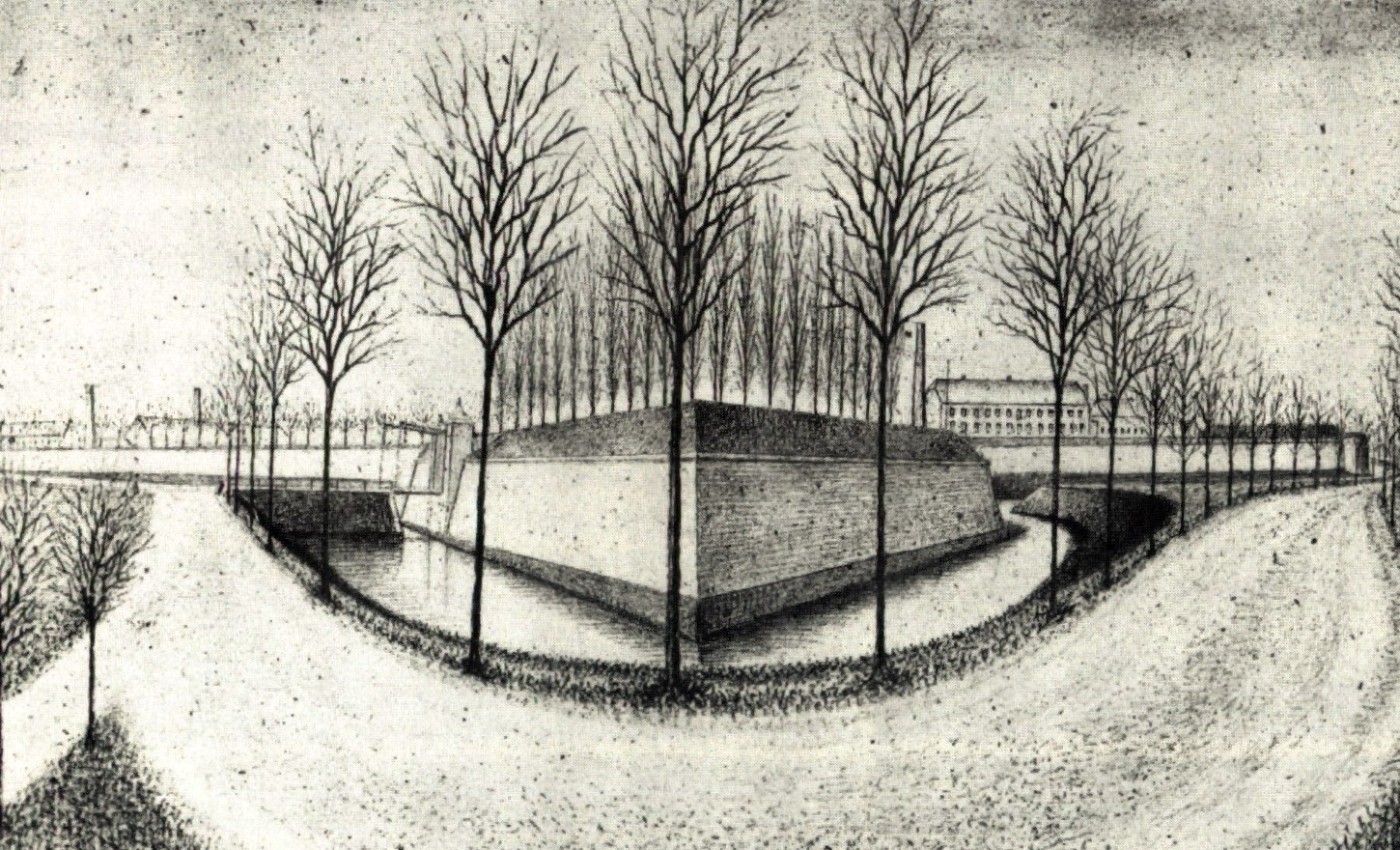
1865 engraving of a ravelin at Maastricht, similar to that captured by French troops on 24 June 1673.

The Treaty of Dover included an agreement by Charles II to supply a brigade of 6,000 English and Scottish troops for the French army. It also contained secret provisions, not revealed until 1771, one being the payment to Charles of £230,000 per year for these troops. While Charles was anxious to ensure Louis felt he was getting value for money, there were considerable doubts as to the brigade's reliability if asked to fight the Protestant Dutch on behalf of the Catholic French. As a result, it formed part of Turenne's force in the Rhineland but several officers, including the Duke of Monmouth and John Churchill, future Duke of Marlborough were present at Maastricht as volunteers and given prominent positions by Louis to gratify his English ally. The attacking forces numbered about forty thousand men.

The garrison was commanded by Jacques de Fariaux, an experienced French huguenot exile in Dutch service. Due to the serious situation of the Dutch, many regiments had been withdrawn from Maastricht after May 1672. In June 1673, eight regiments of States infantry, three regiments of States cavalry, an engineer company and a grenadier company remained. The Dutch troops had been reinforced by a Spanish Division containing a regiment of Italian infantry and two regiments of Spanish cavalry. The defenders totalled about five thousand men. This was about three thousand men below the strength that the city commanders had already in 1671 indicated as the minimum for a successful defence.

Between 1645 and 1672, the fortifications had been completely neglected, falling into disrepair. They largely consisted of earthworks that were susceptible to erosion. Makeshift repairs in 1672 and 1673 had only partly improved the situation. Wooden palisades were constructed to reinforce weak spots. A lunette had been added in front of the vulnerable Tongeren Gate.

== Siege ==
=== Fortification by besiegers ===
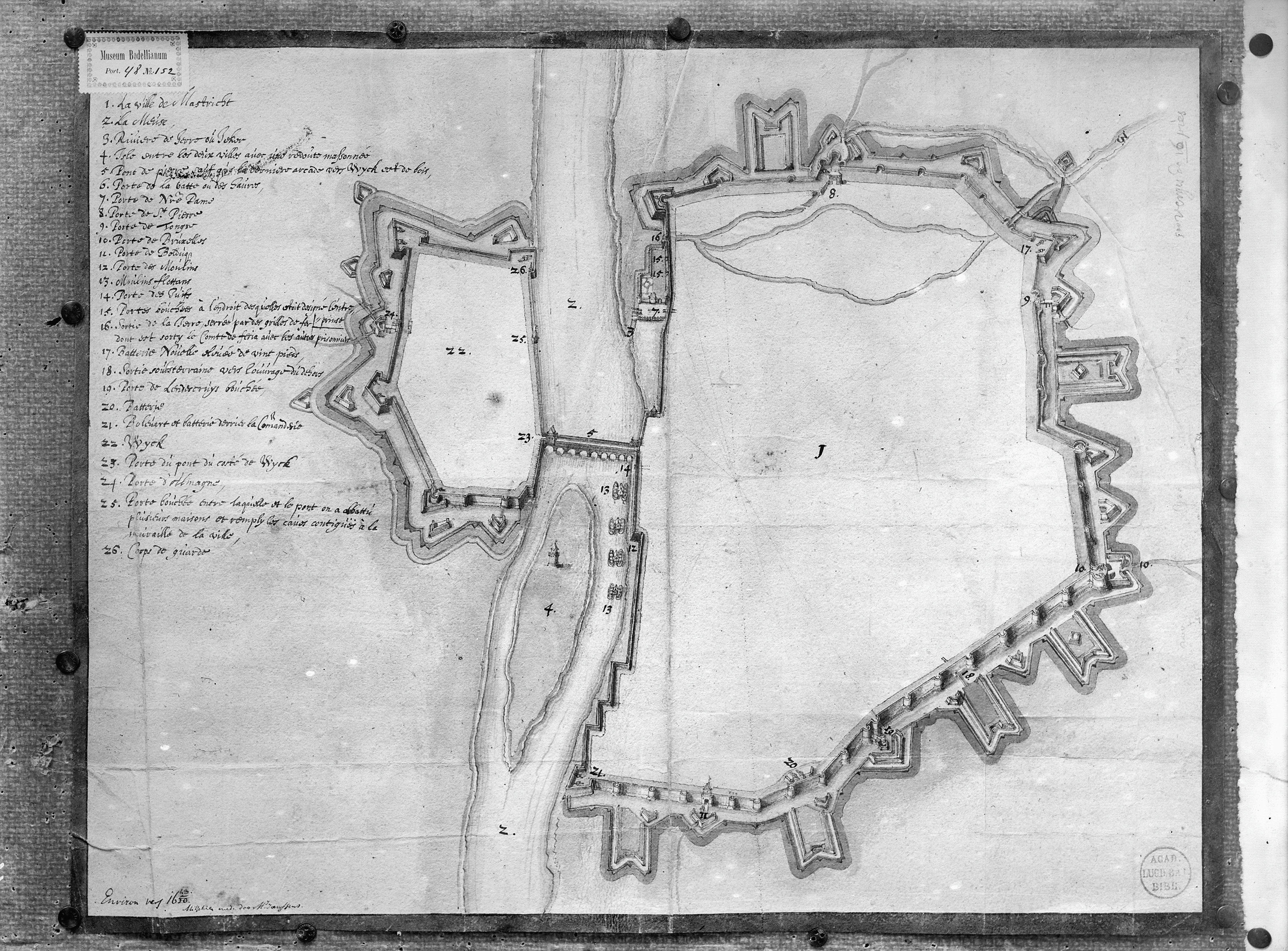
The fortifications in 1643. They had little changed in 1673. South is up and the Tongeren Gate is visible in the upper right corner of the map, just above the hornwork.

On 5 June, the first French troops reached Maastricht, advancing towards the west bank of the Maas. That night and early into the morning of 6 June a defender identified as the Baron of Vervix led a cavalry sortie in which he was wounded and captured. Though the exact identity of this officer and his noble family are unknown, reports of his capture were conveyed to the garrison by another prisoner who returned to the fortress on the 11th. A contemporaneous document referred to the Baron of Vervix as son of the Count of Brovay Later on the 6th troops from Turenne appeared on the east bank, outside the Wijck suburb. On 7 June, the construction of two ship bridges was started, to the north of the city, to connect both forces. Simultaneously, a host of at least seven thousand peasants began to dig the contravallation and circumvallation, even though no relief army was expected. The defenders that day made a sally, followed by a second sortie on 9 June, killing a limited number of French. On 10 June, Louis XIV arrived. The following day, after the completion of the bridges during the night, he was joined by his brother Philippe I, Duke of Orléans and camped at Wolder, a village to the southwest of the city, in an enormous tent able to accommodate four hundred courtiers. De Fariaux was demanded to surrender the city but refused.

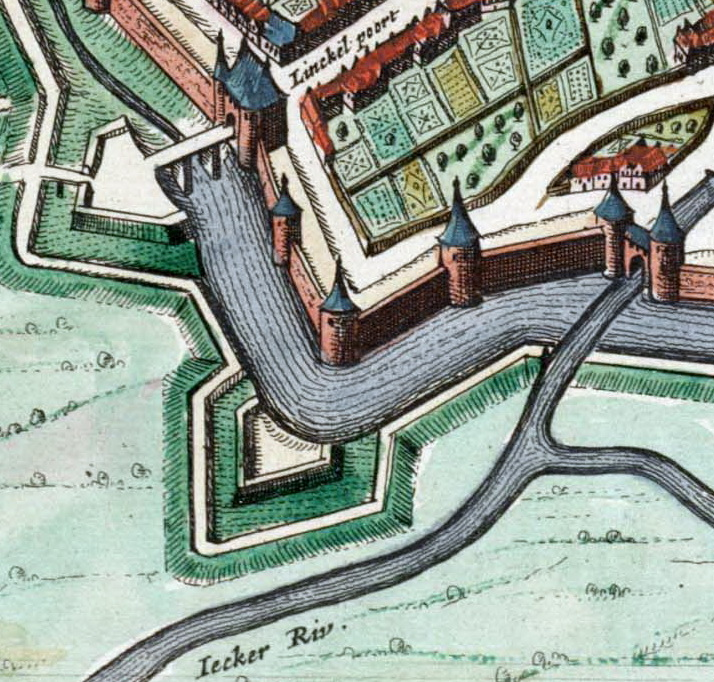
The Tongeren Gate engraved by Joan Blaeu, in the Atlas van Loon.

On 13 June, the French began to prepare large amounts of wood and digging materials on the west-side of the city. The north of the fortress was protected by a deep and wide moat, directly connected to the river Maas, while the south was covered by the Jeker rivulet, which would flood trenches. The obvious attack route therefore was from the west, over the high and rocky ridge leading to the ford that had in Roman times been the origin of the settlement. Frederick Henry in 1632 had attacked this side also. The drawback of the location was that deeper trenches of the type Vauban preferred had to be dug through more or less solid rock. This was still feasible, however, because the layers consisted of relatively soft marlstone. In this sector two main gates were present, the Brussels Gate in the north and the Tongeren Gate (Tongersepoort, Porte Tongres) in the south.

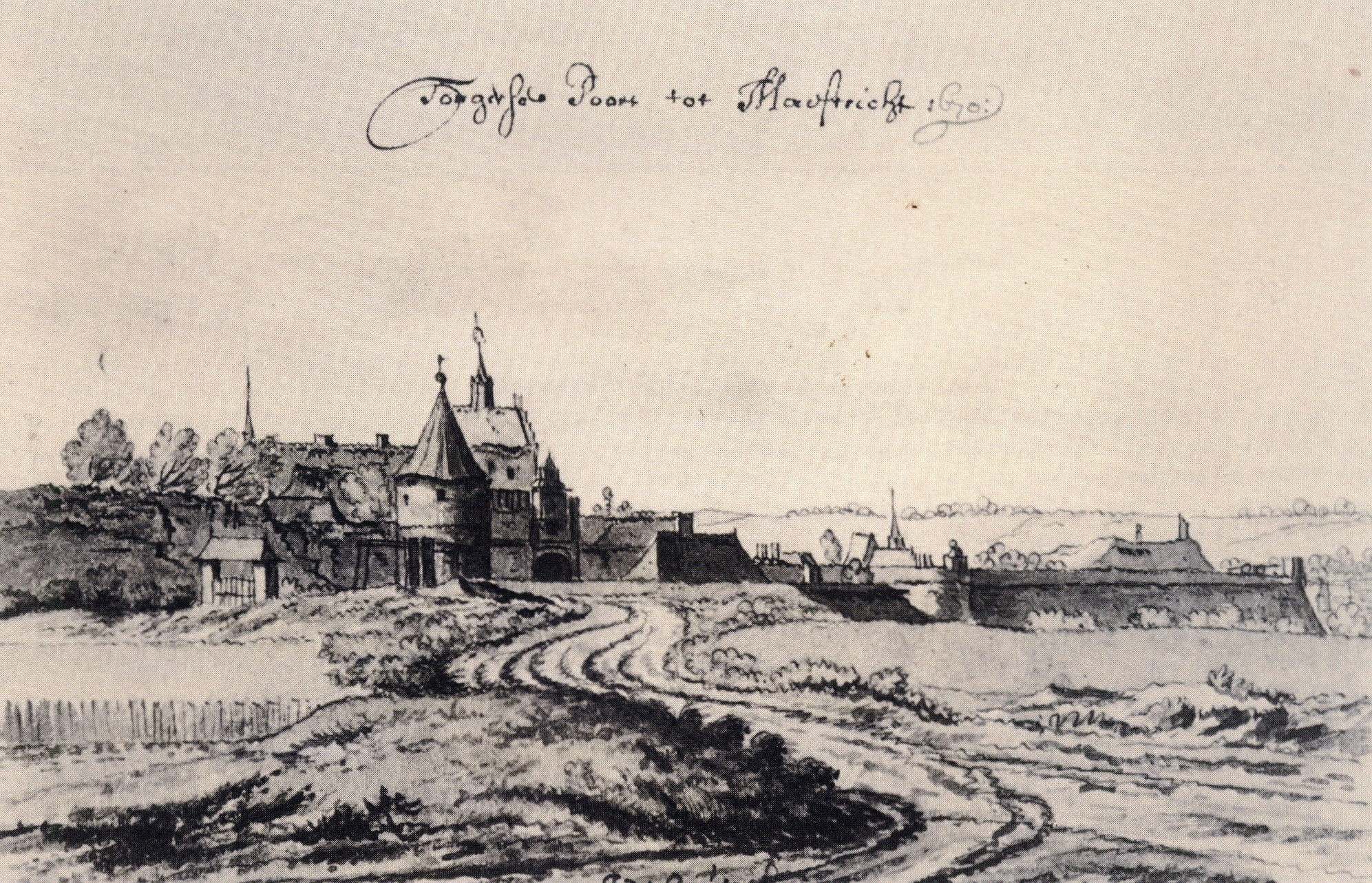
The Tongeren Gate in 1670, before the lunette was added.

Around 14 June, the circumvallation was in principle finished. Due to difficult terrain large gaps remained, which was not seen as a problem as the structure served no real function. In 1632, Frederick Henry's circumvallation had been much more extensive. The same day a third bridge was completed to the south of the city. The French were equipped with sixty-three large caliber cannon. On 16 June, gun batteries were positioned, two in front of the Tongeren Gate and one on the north slope of the St Pietersberg which offers an ideal vantage point over the fortress. The guns, once in place, immediately opened fire, spending three thousand shot in the first six hours. During the entire siege, about twenty-thousand shot were by them fired, out of a total stockpile of fifty-thousand. It now became clear that the Tongeren Gate was the main object. It formed a weak point in the defences as it was protected by a small ravelin only and the city wall behind this was still mediaeval in form, without a full height backing earthwork, though a cavalier was present, the Tongerse Kat. Furthermore, there was only a dry moat to its north. In front of the ravelin a new lunette had been constructed but to obtain the necessary earth, to the south a nearby redoubt protecting the Jeker sluice inlet had been levelled. Vauban later criticised this, claiming that if the redoubt had still be present he had not dared to attack at this point because of its enfilading fire. Such fire was still provided by a large protruding hornwork to the north of the gate and the Groene Halve Maan, a demi-lune to its south.

At 21:00, 17 June, the two assault trenches towards the Tongeren Gate were opened. Work progressed at a steady pace under the cover of darkness and already in the late night a start could be made with the first parallel, their connecting trench, which was finished the next day. During 19 and 20 June, the second parallel was constructed. De Fariaux considered a sally to destroy the trenches but decided against it because they were too extensive and had been reinforced by artillery. The French gun batteries smashed the palisades, silenced the Dutch cannon on the Tongerse Kat, and created small breaches in the main wall. This caused much nervousness among the city population, as traditionally soldiers had the right to plunder a city once its wall had been breached. On 23 June, the left and right assault trenches reached their farthest point, about 160 metres from the forward defences, beyond effective musket range. During the night of 23/24 June, the third parallel was finished and about 2500 troops were assembled in it to storm the gate.

=== Assault ===
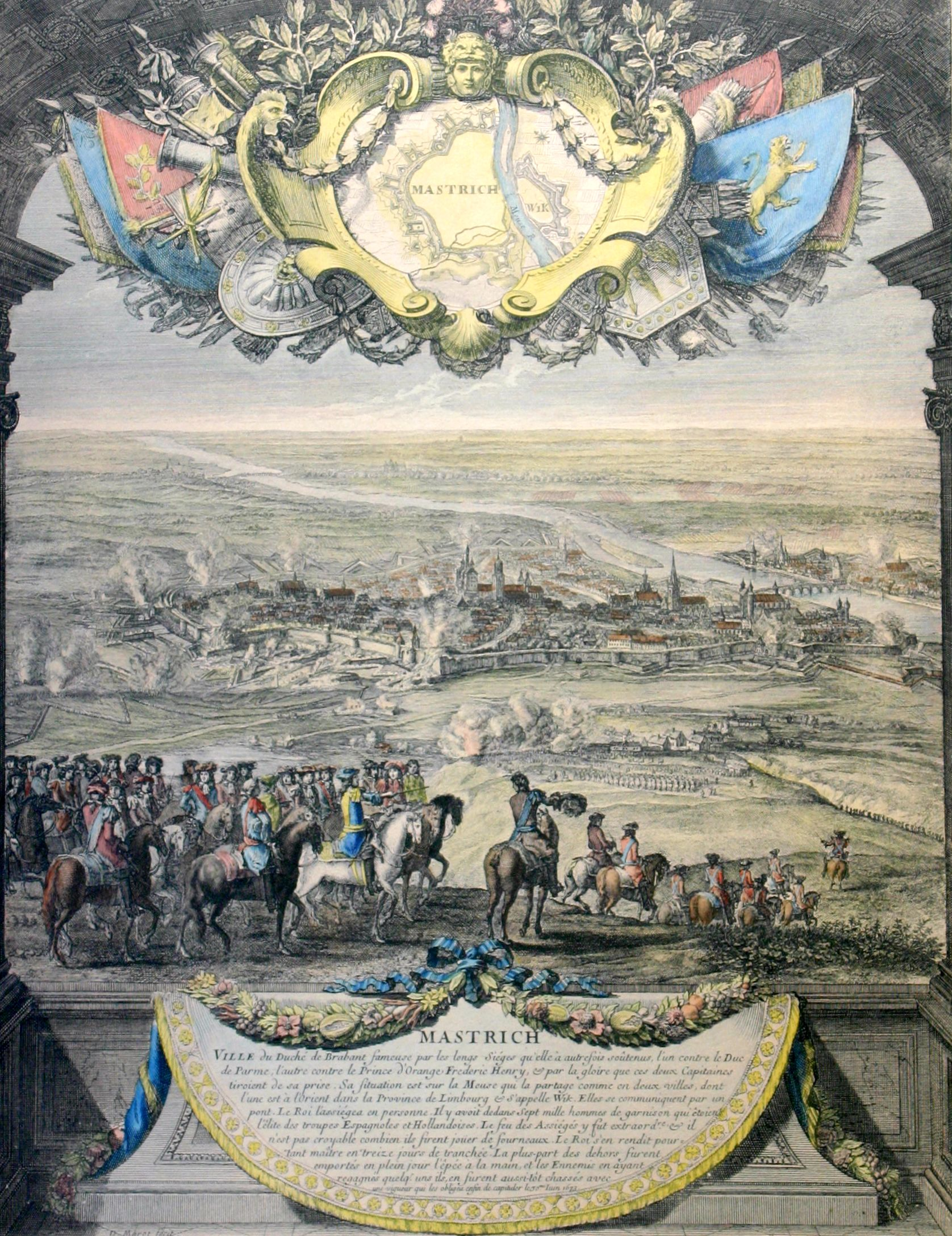
Image of the siege.

In the city a rumour circulated that Louis was in haste to end the siege in order to celebrate mass in its St Janskerk on the nativity of Saint John the Baptist, 24 June. At 17:00, five cannon shots were fired to mark the start of the assault. As a diversionary attack, first Wijck was assaulted, on the other side of the river, to draw away the defenders. The Dutch here with difficulty repelled the attack. Their commander, the famous poet Lieutenant-Colonel Johan van Paffenrode, was killed. The assault force at the Tongeren Gate was divided into three separate parts. The Marquis de Montbrun commanded the main effort against the lunette. There were two diversionary attacks. The one on the right was led by Charles de Montsaulnin, Comte de Montal, against the Groene Halve Maan. The Duke of Monmouth commanded that on the left, which included some fifty English volunteers and a company of Mousquetaires du roi under Captain-Lieutenant D'Artagnan, directed against the hornwork. Louis had tried to dissuade Monmouth from participating, fearing that his death might deteriorate relations with England, but ultimately the king felt obliged to give his permission though providing him with a bulletproof armour, which indeed might have saved his life. Vauban had ordered that the secondary attacks had to be only feints, but to his disgust Monmouth attempted to scale the hornwork and was beaten off with heavy losses, over a hundred casualties. At the first contre-escarpe, an artificial escarpment offering the defenders a forward covered transverse communication line, and the Groene Halve Maen, the French too suffered many losses, especially among their officers. The lunette was taken, quickly recaptured by a counterattack and then taken again. In the late evening, French engineers connected the lunette to the third parallel via a provisional communication trench.

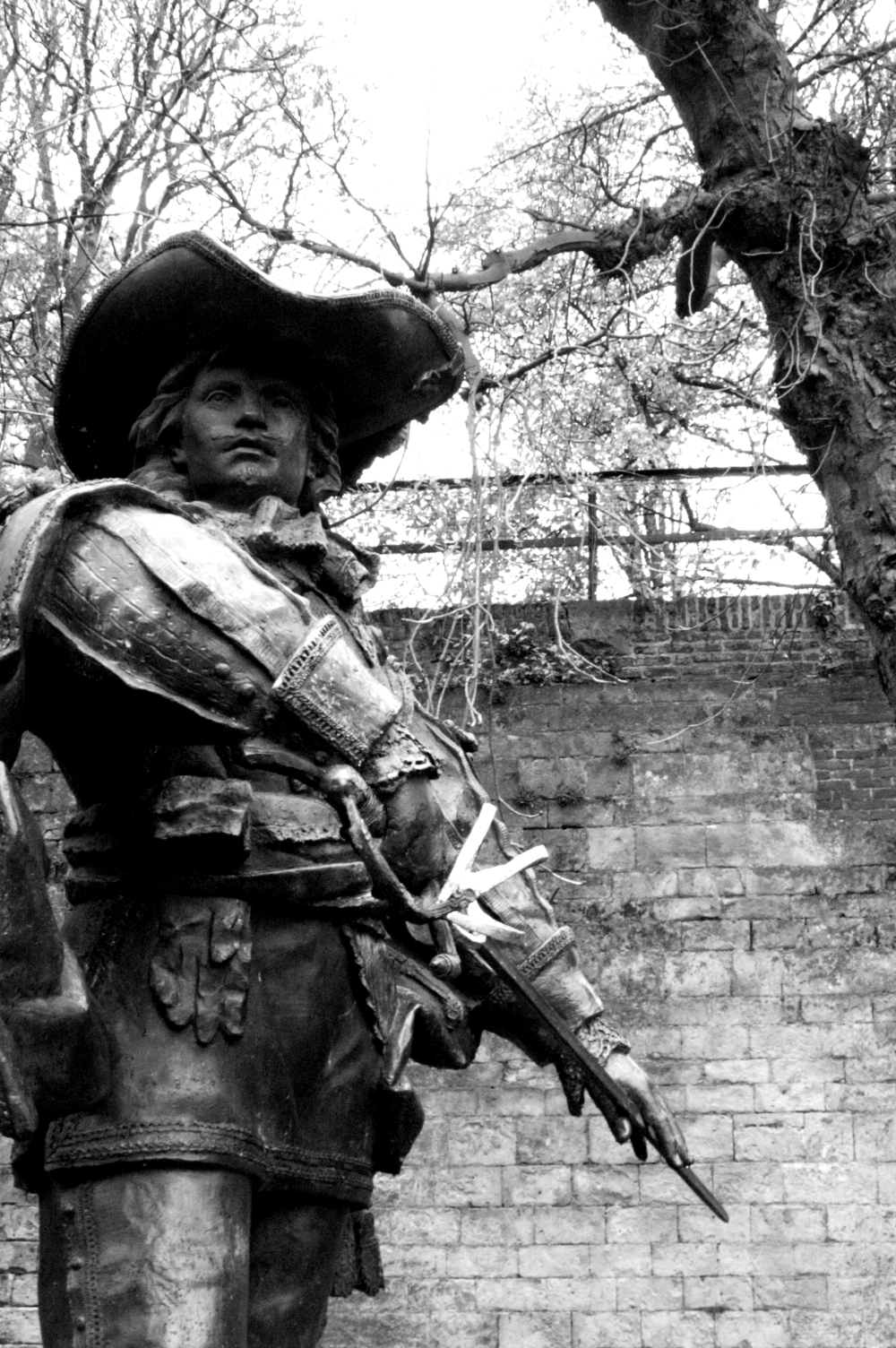
D'Artagnan's statue in Maastricht. Dumas's The Vicomte of Bragelonne: Ten Years Later contains a romanticised account of his death.

Part of the defences of the city were permanent tunnels that had been dug under the marl plateau to the west. During the period of neglect after 1645, these had partly collapsed but prior to the siege some hasty repairs had been carried out. As the French troops were being relieved at daybreak on the early morning of 25 June, the Dutch let a mine explode under the lunette, killing about fifty attackers. Immediately the defenders made a sally and recaptured the lunette for a second time. In response the British and French attacked again, Monmouth circling the lunette from the left, D'Artagnan from the right, while the 2nd Musketeer Company assaulted the front. After a period of confused fighting, the defenders were driven back but several English officers were killed and others wounded, including Churchill. D'Artagnan was fatally hit in the head by a bullet, while passing through a breach in the first contre-escarpe palisade. Of the three hundred musketeers deployed, over eighty had been killed and over fifty severely wounded. In their honour, a later ravelin erected on this location was to be called the demilune des mousquetaires. In this critical phase of the battle, Vauban lost his confidence. It had been assumed that the morale of the garrison was low but it now proved to be much more aggressive than expected. Also he worried about the possible extent of the tunnelling. He wrote to François-Michel le Tellier, Marquis de Louvois, the French minister of war, that if the Dutch managed to recapture the lunette for a third time, it was a distinct possibility that the siege would have to be lifted. At first the attackers had only a tenuous hold on the lunette and it would take them over five hours to bring up reinforcements. Another sortie would not materialise however, the population beginning to fill the gate with manure.

During 26 and 27 June, the French reorganised, rebuilding their assault teams. On the previous days, they had lost about two thousand men. It was decided that, before the ravelin in front of the gate could be stormed, first the hornwork and the Groene Halve Maan would have to be reduced to prevent enfilading fire. Gun batteries were placed between the lunette and the hornwork, to bombard it from a short distance. These gun emplacements also could interdict a possible sally from the gate. On 27 June, Louis was in a contemplative mood, silently observing for hours the bombardment of the city, standing on the north slope of the Saint Pietersberg. French engineers dug a tunnel under the hornwork and in the night of 27/28 June they a let a mine explode. The Italian defenders panicked and allowed the ramparts to be scaled. They then rallied, counterattacking with hand grenades, but ultimately were forced to leave possession of the earthwork to the French. The French captured several engineers who revealed the position of mined tunnels. Before the attackers could penetrate the tunnel network, the defenders blew five mines under the hornwork. Although the French readied themselves for a sally, none took place. The understrength garrison was now too weakened. On 28 June, a delegation of burghers requested de Fariaux to surrender. An additional gun battery was placed opposite the gate. In the night of 28/29 June French troops infiltrated to the ravelin which proved to have been abandoned.

=== Surrender ===
On 29 June, a trumpeter again demanded the surrender of the city and de Fariaux again refused. Subsequently, the French batteries intensified their bombardment of both the inner city and the defence works. The batteries on the north slope of the Sint Pietersberg concentrated their fire on the southwest corner of the city wall which collapsed into the moat behind the Groene Halve Maan. This demi-lune was abandoned by the Dutch during the night of 29/30 June. As the situation of the garrison was hopeless, strong moral pressure was applied by the population to de Fariaux not to continue the fight. They reminded him that during the Siege of Maastricht of 1579, on 29 June the Spanish troops of Alexander Farnese, Duke of Parma began to sack the city, in three days murdering a thousand of its inhabitants. They begged him to prevent a repeat of these tragic events.

In the early morning of 30 June, de Fariaux sent a message that he was ready to negotiate. After two hours of talks, he surrendered the city on relatively favourable terms. The garrison was given free passage, with drums beating and colours flying, to the nearest Dutch-held territory in 's-Hertogenbosch, 150 kilometres to the north-west. They included Van Coehoorn, who had been wounded during the siege. There would be no plundering. Maastricht was a condominium of the Duchy of Brabant, the rights of which had been subsumed by the Dutch Republic and Liège. The bishop of Liège, Maximilian Henry of Bavaria, was Louis's formal ally in the war. Also, the French king claimed to be the rightful Duke of Brabant already, as the title would be part of the dowry of his wife. In any case, he intended the city to be a permanent French possession. Immediately after the surrender two French regiments occupied the Duitse Poort in the east Wijck suburb and, in the west, the Brussels Gate through which Louis would make his triumphal entry.

Losses on both sides had been heavy. The number of troops arriving in 's-Hertogenbosch is exactly known: 3118. If the number of defenders was indeed five thousand, their casualties must have numbered at about 1700. Estimates of the French losses vary considerably. They have been estimated at nine hundred dead and fourteen hundred wounded; at roughly about twice the number of Dutch casualties; or by contemporary Dutch accounts at six thousand killed and four thousand wounded. The Dutch at the time, for propaganda reasons, published long lists of French officers killed.

== Aftermath ==
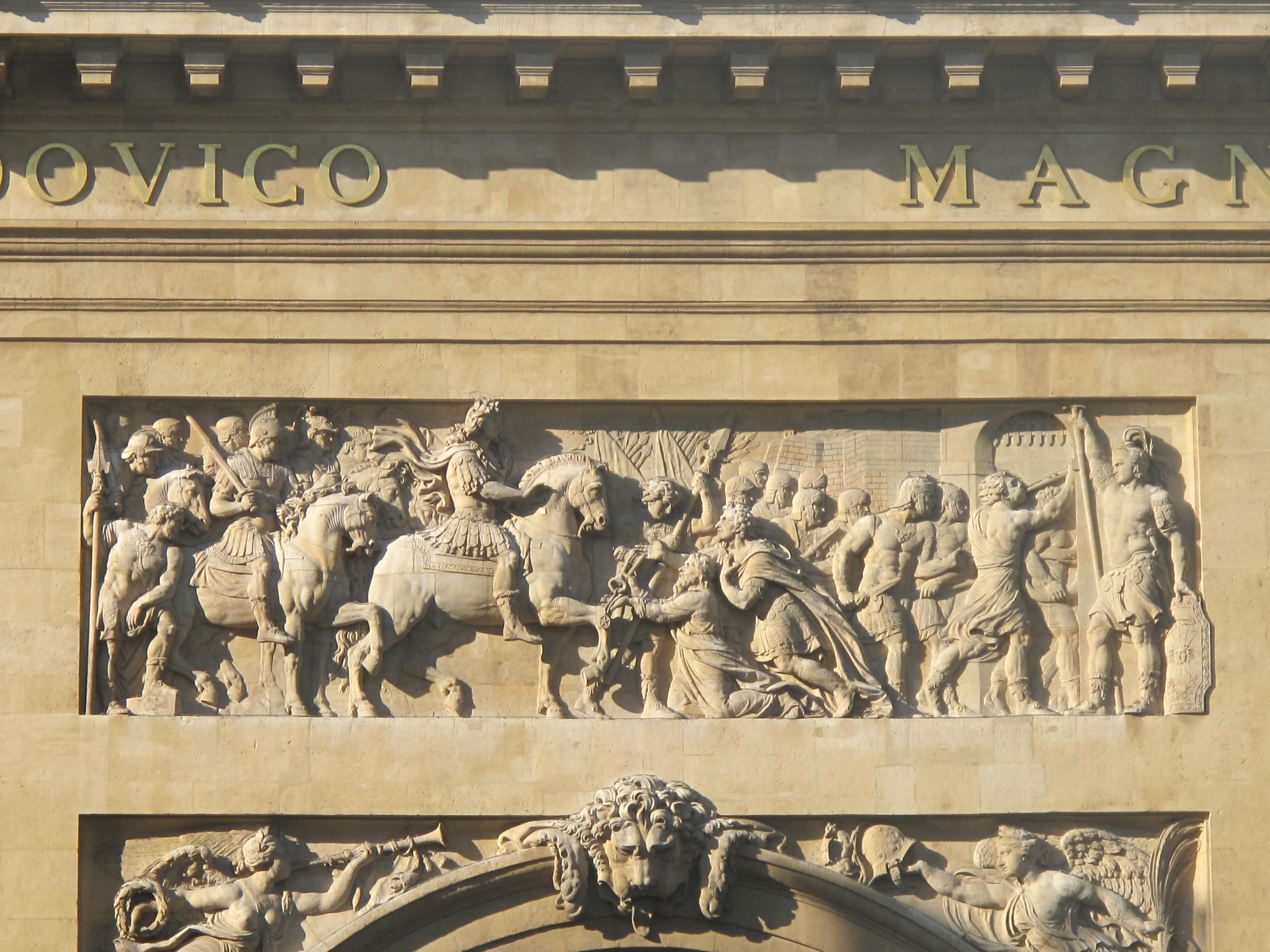
The relief by Anguier.

The quick fall of Maastricht meant that Louis had some time to spare. To keep himself occupied he attacked the Electorate of Trier, without a declaration of war, on the pretext the bishop had allowed the entry of some companies of imperial troops. The city of Trier was besieged and largely destroyed. William III had feared that 's-Hertogenbosch or Breda would be the next French target and had assembled an allied States-Spanish army of thirty thousand at Geertruidenberg to relieve any of these cities. The French had indeed considered an attack on 's-Hertogenbosch but decided against it because success could not be guaranteed in view of the marshy terrain. Although losing Maastricht was a blow to Dutch morale, the Trier siege it gave cause to would be very favourable to them. Public opinion in the German states was outraged by the French conduct. The emperor moved his army into the Rhineland and Louis in response withdrew most of his troops from the Holland Water Line, dangerously weakening his hold on Utrecht and Gelderland.

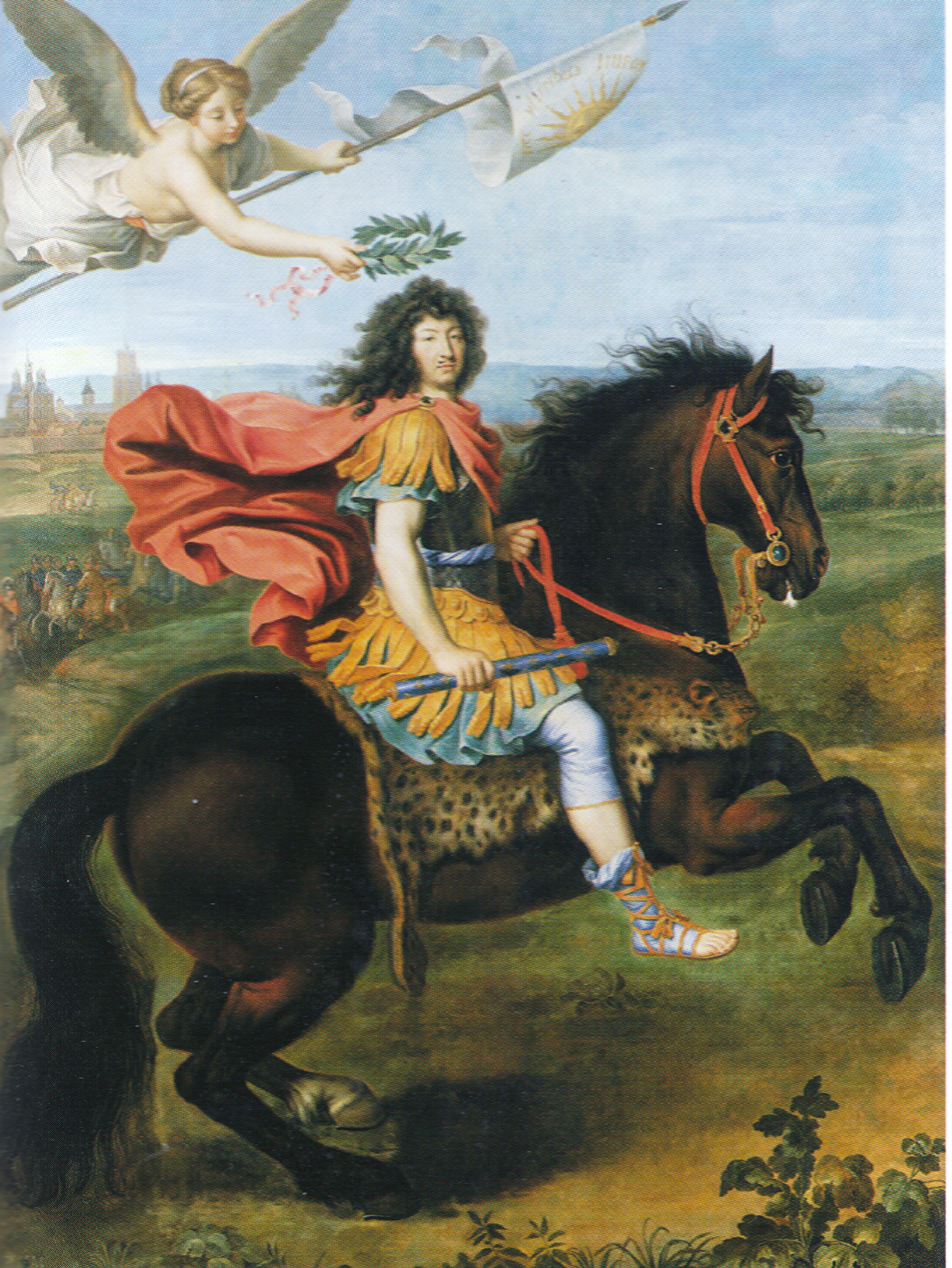
Louis as a Roman triumphator, by Pierre Mignard

Shortly after the fall of Maastricht, the Dutch agreed the August 1673 Treaty of The Hague with Emperor Leopold and Spain, joined in October by Charles IV, Duke of Lorraine, creating the Quadruple Alliance. At the Water Line William III of Orange recaptured the fortress town of Naarden on 13 September. With the war expanding into the Rhineland and Spain, French troops withdrew from the Dutch Republic, retaining only Grave and Maastricht. Grave was recaptured by the Dutch in 1674.

The alliance between England and Catholic France had been unpopular from the start and although the real terms of the Treaty of Dover remained secret, many suspected them. In early 1674, Denmark joined the Alliance, while England and the Dutch made peace in the Treaty of Westminster. William III tried to recapture Maastricht in 1676 but failed, the French having greatly improved the fortifications according to a plan drawn by Vauban. Immediately after the siege, Vauban spent three weeks surveying the city and its surroundings to create detailed maps of the terrain. Then a large-scale maquette of the fortress was made. After much controversy among historians, the present consensus is that this model was discarded relatively early and is not identical to the extant Maastricht maquette in the Paris Musée de l'Armée which shows the situation in the middle of the eighteenth century. On 16 September 1673, de Louvois had written that Louis would sooner give up Paris or Versailles than ever return Maastricht, but the city was nevertheless returned to the Dutch when the Treaty of Nijmegen ended the war in 1678. The French used the city as a bargaining chip to seduce the Dutch to cease supporting the Spanish war aims. They had promised that after a victory, the city would be ceded to the Spanish Netherlands, but refused when peace had been signed, claiming that otherwise the treaty conditions would be violated.

The siege was the subject of a set of paintings by Charles Le Brun on the ceiling of the Hall of Mirrors in Versailles. Adam Frans van der Meulen also dedicated a series of paintings to the event. Louis had the Porte Saint-Denis redesigned to commemorate this siege also, a plaque dedicating it LUDOVICO MAGNO, QUOD TRAJECTUM AD MOSAM – XIII. DIEBUS CEPIT, "to Louis the Great, for capturing Maastricht in thirteen days". The reliefs depicting the siege were made by Michel Anguier.

== Sources ==
- Boxer, CR (1969). "Some Second Thoughts on the Third Anglo-Dutch War, 1672–1674". Transactions of the Royal Historical Society. 19: 67–94. doi:10.2307/3678740. JSTOR 3678740. S2CID 159934682.
- Childs, John (2014). General Percy Kirke and the Later Stuart Army. Bloomsbury Academic. ISBN 978-1474255141.
- Childs, John (1991). The Nine Years' War and the British Army, 1688-1697: The Operations in the Low Countries. Manchester University Press. ISBN 978-0719089961.
- Duffy, Christopher (1995). Siege Warfare: The Fortress in the Early Modern World 1494-1660. Routledge. ISBN 978-0415146494.
- Eysten (1911). "Coehoorn, Menno baron van". In P.J. Blok; P.C. Molhuysen (eds.). Nieuw Nederlandsch Biografisch Woordenboek. Deel 1 (in Dutch). pp. 620–622.
- Holmes, Richard (2001). Singleton, Charles; Jones, Dr Spencer (eds.). Vauban, Marshal Sebastien le Prestre de (1633–1707). doi:10.1093/acref/9780198606963.001.0001. ISBN 9780198606963.
- Kenyon, JP (1993). The History Men; the Historical Profession in England since the Renaissance. Weidenfeld and Nicolson. ISBN 978-0297782544.
- Jenniskens, A.H. (2006). De Maquettes van Maastricht (in Dutch). Stichting Historische Reeks Maastricht. ISBN 978-9058420275.
- LePage, Jean-Denis (2009). Vauban and the French Military Under Louis XIV: An Illustrated History of Fortifications and Sieges. McFarland & Company. ISBN 978-0786444014.
- Lynn, John (1996). The Wars of Louis XIV, 1667-1714 (Modern Wars in Perspective). Longman. ISBN 978-0582056299.
- Morreau, LJ (1979). Bolwerk der Nederlanden. De vestingwerken van Maastricht sedert het begin van de 13e eeuw (in Dutch). Assen.
- Panhuysen, Luc (2009). Rampjaar 1672: Hoe de Republiek aan de ondergang ontsnapte (in Dutch). Uitgeverij Atlas. ISBN 9789045013282.
- Panhuysen, Luc (2016). Oranje tegen de Zonnekoning: De strijd van Willem III en Lodewijk XIV om Europa (in Dutch). De Arbeiderspers. ISBN 978-9029538718.
- Panhuysen, Luc (2023). Maastricht 1673: De Zonnekoning verovert de stad (in Dutch). Waanders Uitgevers. ISBN 978-9462624894.
- Vesilind, P Aame (2010). Engineering Peace and Justice: The Responsibility of Engineers to Society. Springer. ISBN 978-1447158226.
- Young, William (2004). International Politics and Warfare in the Age of Louis XIV and Peter the Great. iUniverse. ISBN 978-0595329922.
