= Philip Babington (died 1690) =

English military officer (1632–1690)

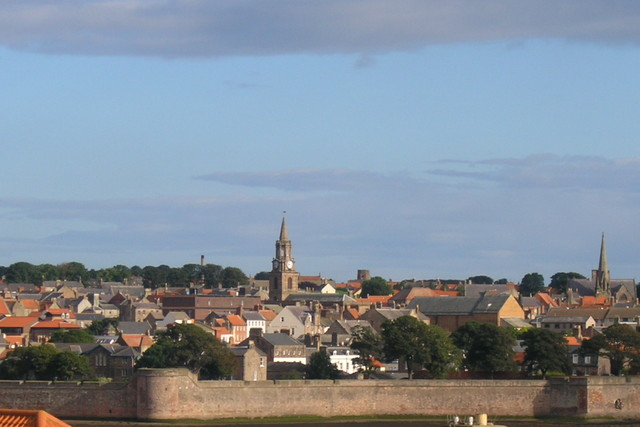
- Berwick upon Tweed; Babington was MP and Governor in 1690

Member of Parliament for Berwick-upon-Tweed
- In office January 1689 – February 1690

Governor of Berwick-upon-Tweed
- In office January 1689 – December 1690 †

Personal details
- Born: 1632 Heaton, Newcastle, Northumberland
- Died: 30 December 1690 (aged 58) Ireland
- Resting place: Unknown
- Spouse(s): (1) Catherine Haselrig (1662-1670) (2) Anne Webb (1679-his death)
- Children: (1) Mary; Catherine; Philip
- Education: Christ Church, Oxford
- Occupation: Soldier

Military service
- Rank: Colonel
- Unit: Dutch Scots Brigade 1674–1688; Babingtons Regiment, later 6th Foot, 1689–1690
- Battles/wars: Glencairn's rising Battle of Dalnaspidal 1654; Franco-Dutch War; Cassel Saint-Denis; Williamite War in Ireland; The Boyne; Siege of Athlone (1690)

Philip Babington (1632–1690) was an English military officer, who served in the armies of the Commonwealth of England, the Dutch Republic and England. He accompanied William III to England in the 1688 Glorious Revolution and was Member of Parliament and Governor for Berwick-upon-Tweed from 1689 to 1690.

In April 1690, he joined the army that served in the Williamite War in Ireland. He fought at The Boyne in July and died of disease before the end of 1690.

== Personal details ==
Philip Babington was born in 1632, eldest of seven surviving children of William Babington (1608-1648) and Elizabeth Helmes. His father owned estates in Heaton, Newcastle upon Tyne; during the 1642–1646 First English Civil War, he was county commissioner under the Militia Ordinance and a Colonel in the New Model Army.

In 1662, he married Catherine (died 1670), daughter of Arthur Hesilrige, one of the Five Members whose attempted arrest sparked the First English Civil War. They had three children before her death in 1670, Mary, Catherine (died after 1721) and Philip (died after 1722), who also became a soldier and was receiving Half-pay in 1722. He married Anne Webb in 1679, daughter of William Webb, headmaster of Berwick School. After his death in Ireland, she received a small pension from the government; in 1707, she was still being paid an annual pension of £100.

== Career ==
Babington attended Christ Church, Oxford in 1650, then studied law at Gray's Inn before joining the army; his first major action was in 1654 when he fought in the Battle of Dalnaspidal that ended Glencairn's rising. When the 1660 Stuart Restoration returned Charles II to the throne, he was a captain in the Northumberland Militia.

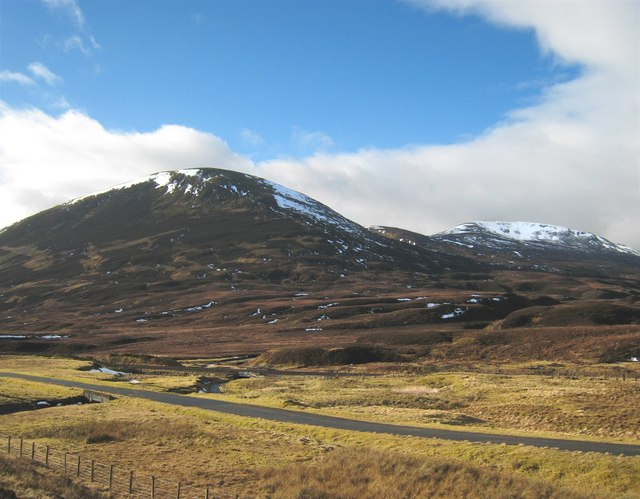
Dalnaspidal, location of Babington's first battle in 1654

Katherine's father Sir Arthur escaped execution by the new regime but was held in the Tower of London, where he died in January 1661. Shortly after his marriage, Babington moved to Harnham Hall, near Bolam, Northumberland; he and his wife were both Puritans and in 1666, Katherine was excommunicated by the Church of England for pulling the Bolam parish priest from his pulpit in protest at his sermons. As a result, she was denied churchyard burial when she died in September 1670 and Babington instead built her a tomb in the grounds of Harnham Hall, which still exists.

In 1674, Harnham Hall was leased to William Veitch (1640–1722), a Scottish Presbyterian radical exiled for his involvement in the 1666 Pentland Rising. Babington resumed his military career by joining the Scots Brigade, a mercenary unit in the Dutch Republic whose origins went back to the 1580s. Despite the name, it normally contained three Scots and three English regiments; the latter were withdrawn when England allied with France in the 1672–1678 Franco-Dutch War but restored after the 1674 Treaty of Westminster ended their involvement. By 1674, the remaining regiments had lost much of their national identity and a deliberate policy was adopted to re-establish them as English and Scottish units.

Babington was appointed Captain in one of the restored English regiments, which eventually became the Royal Warwickshire Regiment. He was promoted Major after Cassel in 1677, then wounded and taken prisoner at Saint-Denis in 1678. Released when the Treaties of Nijmegen ended the Franco-Dutch War in August, in 1682 he was appointed Lieutenant-Colonel of the English regiment commanded by Sir Henry Belasyse. At this time, his former tenant William Veitch joined the group of English and Scots exiles in Holland, one of whom was the Earl of Argyll; when James II became King in 1685, Veitch reappeared in Northumberland, recruiting for the proposed Monmouth Rebellion in South-West England and Argyll's Rising in Scotland.

Babington's connection with Veitch meant that when William of Orange, later William III of England sent the Brigade to England to suppress these revolts, James demanded his dismissal. William refused, although he agreed to remove him from command of English troops; he described him as 'a very prudent and honourable man, and assuredly a very brave and excellent officer – even one of the best who have served me here of his nation.'

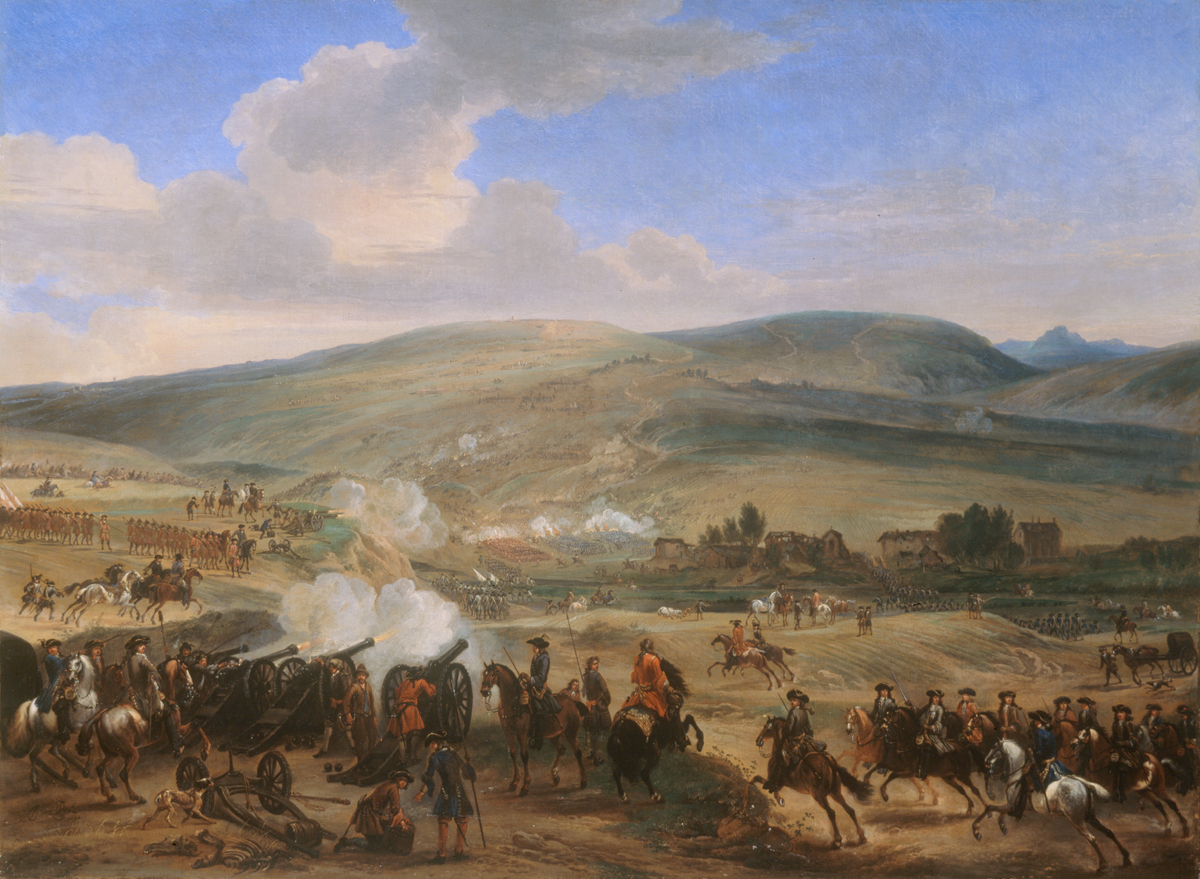
Battle of the Boyne, July 1690

In the event, the Brigade arrived after the rebellions had been crushed and returned to the Netherlands in August 1685 without seeing any fighting. In early 1688, James demanded the repatriation of the entire Brigade; William refused to comply but used the opportunity to remove officers of doubtful loyalty. When Sir Henry Bellasyse returned to England in April 1688, Babington replaced him as Colonel and the unit accompanied William to England in the Glorious Revolution of November 1688; en route, a ship carrying four of its companies was captured but the soldiers released after James went into exile.

Babington was appointed Governor of Berwick-upon-Tweed and elected to the Convention Parliament as MP for Berwick-upon-Tweed. In 1690, his regiment was transferred from the Dutch to the English military establishment, with its seniority backdated to 1685. It was now listed as 'Babington's Regiment' or simply 'Babingtons;' at this time, regiments were considered the personal property of their Colonel and carried their name, which changed when transferred to another.

In April 1690, his unit joined the army led by Frederick Schomberg fighting the Jacobites in the 1689–1691 Williamite War in Ireland. Three companies were detached to garrison Charlemont Fort after its capture in May, while the rest fought at the Battle of the Boyne in July, suffering heavy casualties. Following the battle, Babington served under Lieutenant-General James Douglas in an unsuccessful attempt to capture Athlone.

Babington died of disease in Ireland shortly before the end of 1690; his burial place is unknown.

== Sources ==
- Cannon, Richard (1839). Historical Record of the Sixth, or Royal First Warwickshire Regiment of Foot, containing an Account of the Formation of the Regiment in the Year 1674, and of its Subsequent Services to 1838. Longman, Orme and Co., and William Clowes.
- Chandler, David; Beckett, Ian (1996). The Oxford History Of The British Army. Oxford University Press. ISBN 0-19-280311-5.
- Cherry, George (1966). The Convention Parliament 1689: A Biographical Study of Its Members. Irvington Publishers. ISBN 978-0829001631.
- Childs, John (1984). "The Scottish brigade in the service of the Dutch Republic, 1689 to 1782". Documentatieblad Werkgroep Achttiende Eeuw.
- Childs, John (2008). The Williamite Wars in Ireland. Bloomsbury 3PL. ISBN 978-1847251640.
- Dalton, Charles (1904). English army lists and commission registers, 1661–1714; Volume VI. Government and General Publishers.
- Durston, Christopher (2004). "Hesilrige [Haselrig], Sir Arthur, second baronet (1601–1661)". Oxford Dictionary of National Biography (online ed.). Oxford University Press. doi:10.1093/ref:odnb/13123. (Subscription, Wikipedia Library access or UK public library membership required.)
- Ferris, John; Sgroi, Rosemary (2010). Helmes, Sir Henry (c.1576–1627), of London and Graveley, Herts. in The History of Parliament: the House of Commons 1604–1629. CUP.
- Gardner, Ginny (2004). "Veitch, William [alias William Johnston, George Johnston]". Oxford Dictionary of National Biography (online ed.). Oxford University Press. doi:10.1093/ref:odnb/28174. (Subscription, Wikipedia Library access or UK public library membership required.)
- Hampson, Gillian (1983). BABINGTON, Philip (c.1632-90), of Berwick-upon-Tweed, Northumb. in The History of Parliament: the House of Commons 1660–1690. Brewer & Boydell.
- Miggelbrink, Joachim (2002). McKilliop, Andrew; Murdoch, Steve (eds.). Fighting for Identity: Scottish Military Experiences c.1550–1900. Brill. ISBN 9004128239.
- Historic England. "Tomb of Katherine Babington (Grade II) (1304022)". National Heritage List for England.
- Shaw, William, ed. (1952). Declared Accounts 1707: Army in Calendar of Treasury Books, Volume 22, 1708. HMSO.
- Smith, Mark (2014). The History of the Royal Warwickshire Regiment. lulu.com. ISBN 978-1291821192.
- Unknown (1795). An Historical Account of the British Regiments Employed Since the Reign of Queen Elizabeth and King James I In the Formation and Defence of the Dutch Republic Particularly of the Scotch Brigade. T. Kay.

Parliament of Great Britain
Preceded by Ralph Widdrington	MP for Berwick-upon-Tweed; December 1689 – April 1690	Succeeded by Samuel Ogle
Military offices
Preceded by Sir Henry Belasyse	6th Foot, later Royal Warwickshire Regiment; April to December 1690	Succeeded by Prince George of Hesse-Darmstadt
