= George Ramsay (military officer) =

Scottish professional soldier

Lieutenant-General The Honourable George Ramsay
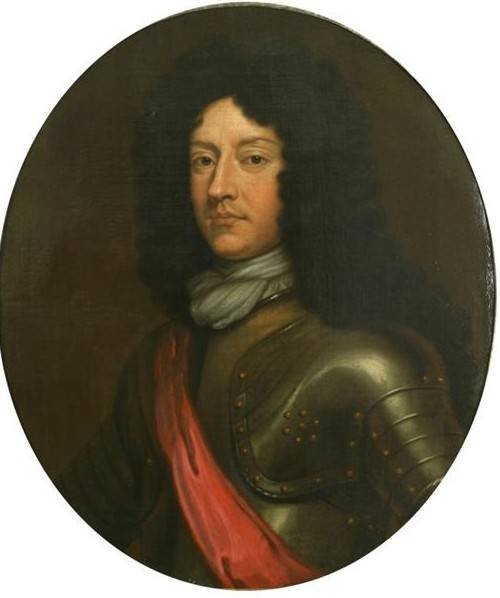
- George Ramsay by Sir John Baptist Medina

Commander-in-Chief, Scotland
- In office 1702–1705

Personal details
- Born: 1652 Dalhousie Castle
- Died: 2 September 1705 (aged 52–53) Edinburgh
- Resting place: Cockpen, Midlothian

Military service
- Years of service: 1674 – 1705
- Rank: Lieutenant-General February 1703
- Battles/wars: Franco-Dutch War; Entzheim; Altenheim; Cassel; Saint-Denis; Jacobite rising of 1689; Killiecrankie; Nine Years' War; Steenkerque; Landen; Namur 1695; War of the Spanish Succession

Lieutenant-General George Ramsay (1652 – 5 September 1705) was a younger son of the Earl of Dalhousie and Scottish professional soldier.

He began his career during the Franco-Dutch War and served with the Scots Brigade, part of the Dutch States Army, which accompanied William III to England in the November 1688 Glorious Revolution. Ramsay fought in the Jacobite rising of 1689 in Scotland before returning to Flanders in 1690 during the Nine Years War, being promoted Brigadier General in March 1691, then Colonel of the Scots Guards in September. (Note: In this period, "Colonel" meant the owner of a regiment and the title was thus distinct from a specific army rank) After the outbreak of the War of the Spanish Succession, he was appointed Commander-in-Chief, Scotland in 1702 and died at Edinburgh in September 1705.

== Life ==
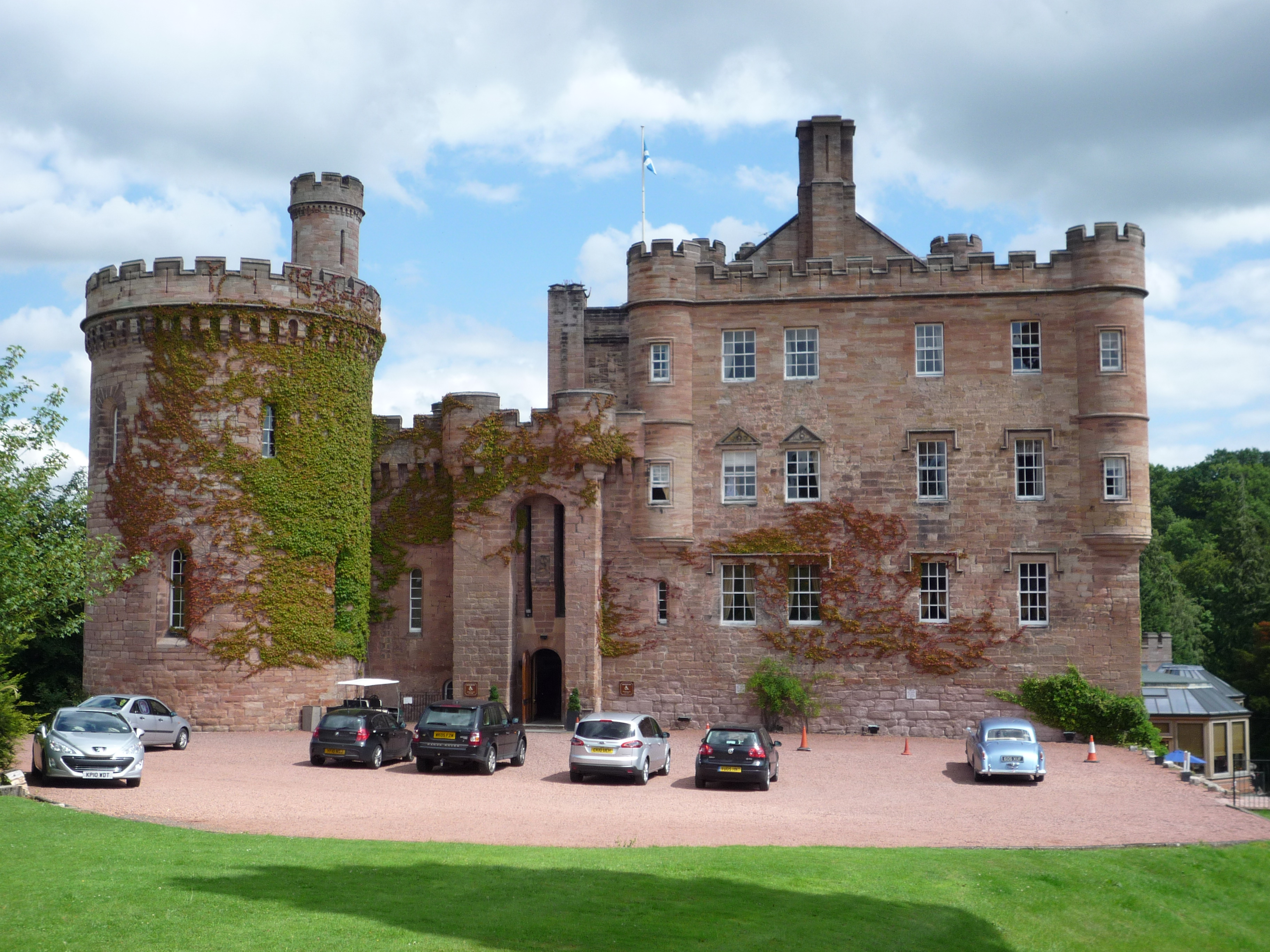
Ramsay's birthplace, Dalhousie Castle

George Ramsay was born in 1652, third son of George Ramsay, 2nd Earl of Dalhousie (1618-1674) and his wife, Anne Fleming. Two of his brothers also served in the military; Robert, who died in 1678 and John, killed serving with the Dutch Scots Brigade in 1694.

He married Anna Boxel, the daughter of a Dutch army officer, whose mother took as her second husband Sir Charles Graham, who later succeeded Ramsay as Colonel of the Third Scottish Regiment of the Scots Brigade. Ramsay and Anna had one daughter, Johanna or Jean, who died unmarried shortly after her father.

== Career ==
=== France and Holland; 1674-1688 ===
The experience of the 1638-1651 Wars of the Three Kingdoms created a deep-seated hostility in Scotland and England to a Standing army and those who wanted a military career had to do so abroad. Foreign soldiers were widely used in all armies; in 1672, 12 out of 58 French infantry battalions were recruited outside France, as were 9 of its 87 cavalry regiments. Loyalties were often based on religion or personal relationships, with officers moving between armies; Turenne (1611-1675), sometimes held to be the best general of his time, served with the Dutch from 1625-1630.

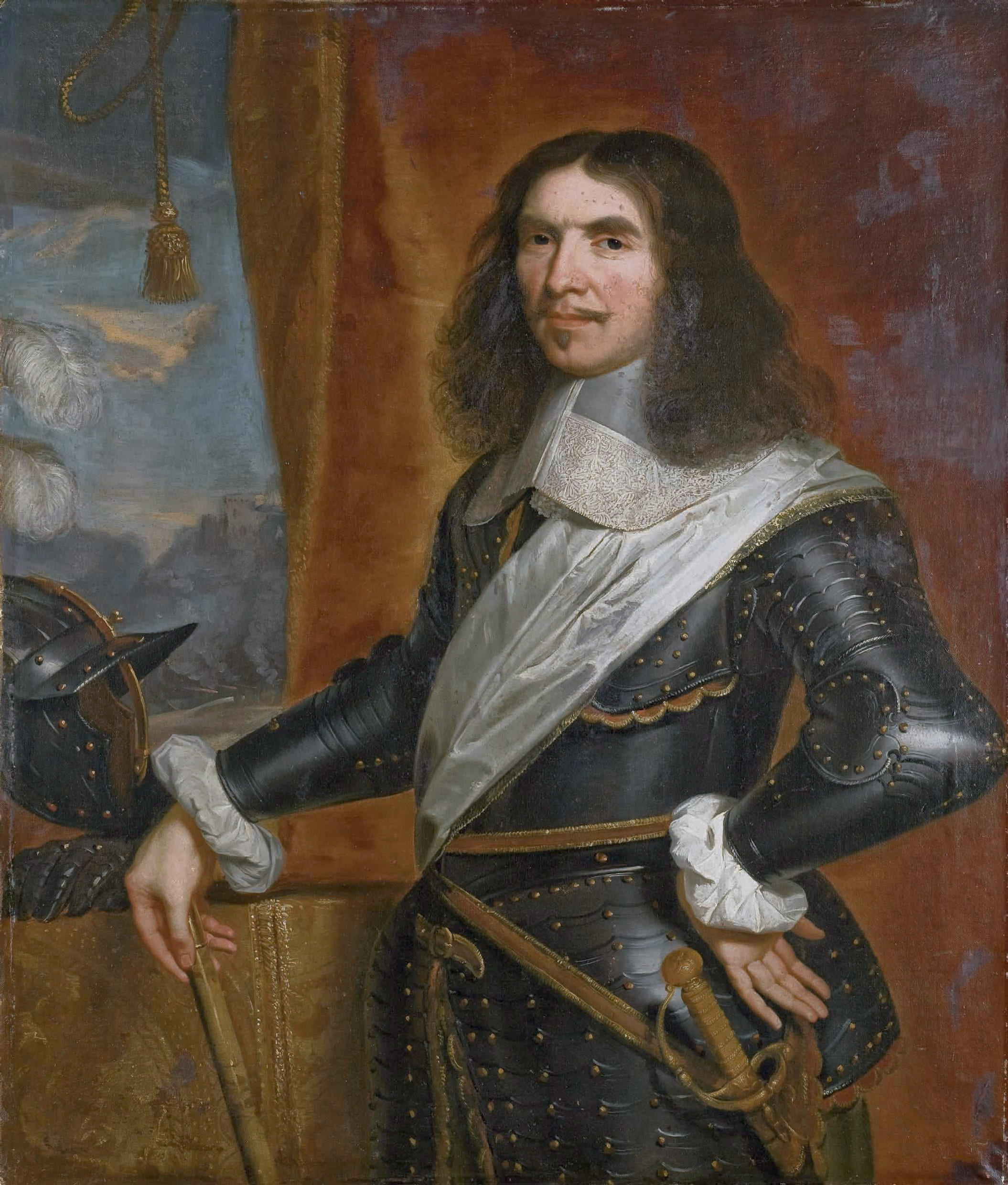
From 1674-1675, Ramsay served in the Rhineland under Turenne, often considered the best general of his time

In the 1670 Treaty of Dover, Charles II of England agreed to support a French attack on the Dutch Republic and provide 6,000 troops for the French army. Louis XIV paid him £230,000 per year for this, a secret provision not revealed until 1775. With the outbreak of the Third Anglo-Dutch War in 1672, Ramsay joined the Royal English Regiment, raised as part of the brigade. Considered unreliable if asked to fight the Protestant Dutch, during the Franco-Dutch War it served in the Rhineland against the Holy Roman Empire.

After England made peace with the Dutch Republic in February 1674, many of these officers transferred to the Scots Brigade, a long-standing mercenary unit of the Dutch States Army. However, the Franco-Dutch War continued and to retain his subsidies, Charles encouraged others to remain in French service. They included Ramsay, who was commissioned into the second battalion of the Royal English and served in Turenne's 1674-1675 campaigns. He fought at Entzheim in 1674 and Altenheim in 1675, where the brigade suffered heavy losses as part of the rearguard.

It proved impossible to replace losses from battle and disease, while service in the French military was extremely unpopular; of 500 men recruited for one regiment in 1678, 213 deserted within two months. The brigade was formally dissolved and Ramsay transferred to the Scots Brigade, which normally contained three Scottish and three English regiments. Withdrawn in 1672, its English units were restored, while the proportion of Scots in the others was markedly increased. Ramsay joined the Third Scots Regiment or 'Colyear's,' fighting at Cassel and Saint-Denis, where he was badly wounded.

The war ended with the 1678 Treaties of Nijmegen but French expansion continued and Ramsay was promoted Major in early 1685. In June, William sent the brigade to help his father-in-law James II suppress simultaneous rebellions in Scotland and England but these quickly collapsed and it returned without seeing action. When James demanded William repatriate the entire brigade in early 1688, he refused, using the opportunity to remove officers of doubtful loyalty. (Note: Since the Brigade was largely recruited from England and Scotland, in theory it was "on loan" and James in particular paid careful attention to the appointment of officers, seeing it as a potential source of professionals in the event of war) Among them was Ramsay's Colonel, John Wauchope, who became a senior Jacobite commander in the 1689-1691 Williamite War in Ireland. As Lieutenant-Colonel, Ramsay commanded the regiment when it accompanied William to England in the November 1688 Glorious Revolution and was appointed Colonel in December.

=== Scotland and Europe; 1688-1705 ===
James went into exile on 23 December after his army deserted him and on 4 January 1689, William appointed the Scots Brigade senior officer Hugh Mackay, commander in Scotland. Ramsay's regiment went with Mackay and after James landed in Ireland on 12 March, another former Scots Brigade officer, John Graham, Viscount Dundee, launched a Scottish rising in his support. Despite their victory at Killiecrankie in July, Dundee's death and lack of reinforcements prevented the Jacobites exploiting it; after their defeat at the Battle of Cromdale in May 1690, the campaign largely focused on minor policing actions, carried out by locally-raised troops.

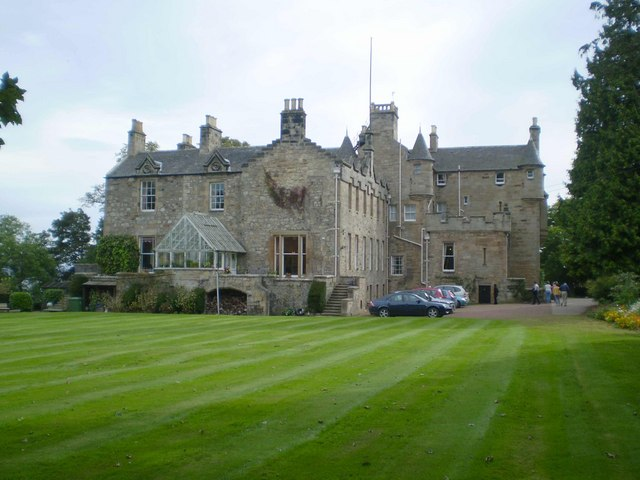
Carriden House, Ramsay's home post 1697

This meant Ramsay was transferred to Flanders, where he spent the rest of the Nine Years War; in March 1691, he was promoted Brigadier-General, and commanded a brigade containing six battalions of British foot. In September, he took over as Colonel of the Scots Guards, after its commander and his former colleague James Douglas died of fever.

Ramsay was present at the battles of Steenkerque in 1692 and Landen in 1693, being promoted Major-General in March 1694. During the recapture of Namur in 1695, he led the attack on 3 July that captured the Heights of Bouge, with the assault force suffering over 4,000 casualties. After the Treaty of Ryswick in 1697, the regiment returned to England, before moving to Scotland in 1699.

Ramsay and his wife took up residence at Carriden House, in Falkirk, after selling Anna's Dutch possessions in 1697, mainly landholdings in Zeeland. When the War of the Spanish Succession began in 1702, he was appointed Commander-in-Chief, Scotland; Marlborough described him as 'a very brave man and a good officer.' Promoted Lieutenant-General in February 1703, he died in Edinburgh on 7 September 1705.

== Sources ==
- Balfour, James Paul (1910). The Scots Peerage, Volume III. The Scots Peerage.
- Cannon, Richard (1846). Historical Record of the First, or Royal Regiment of Foot: Containing an Account of the Origin of the Regiment in the Reign of King James VI of Subsequent Services to 1846 (2012 ed.). Forgotten Books. p. 69.
- Casteleyn (1678). Hollandse Mercurius. Haerlem, Gedruckt. p. 184.
- Childs, John (2014). General Percy Kirke and the Later Stuart Army. Bloomsbury Academic. ISBN 978-1474255141.
- Childs, John (1986). "The Scottish brigade in the service of the Dutch Republic, 1689 to 1782". Documentatieblad Werkgroep Achttiende Eeuw.: 61.
- Childs, John (2004). "Ramsay, George 1652-1705". Oxford Dictionary of National Biography (online ed.). Oxford University Press. doi:10.1093/ref:odnb/66559. (Subscription, Wikipedia Library access or UK public library membership required.)
- Childs, John (1996). Chandler, David; Beckett, Ian (eds.). The Restoration Army in The Oxford History of the British Army (2002 ed.). Oxford University Press. ISBN 978-0192803115.
- Childs, John (1984). "The British Brigade in France 1672-1678". History. 69 (227): 386. doi:10.1111/j.1468-229X.1984.tb01427.x. JSTOR 24419689.
- Crang, Jeremy (2014). Spiers, Edward M (ed.). Military History of Scotland. Edinburgh University Press. ISBN 978-0748694495.
- Folker, Martin. "3rd Foot Guards (Or Scotch Guards)". War of the Spanish succession. Archived from the original on 15 September 2020.;
- Holmes, Richard (2008). Marlborough: Britain's Greatest General: England's Fragile Genius. Harper Press. ISBN 978-0007225712.
- Kenyon, JP (1983). History Men. Littlehampton Book Services Ltd. ISBN 978-0297780816.
- Lynn, John; The Wars of Louis XIV, 1667-1714 (Modern Wars in Perspective); (Longman, 1996);
- Mackay, James (1739). Scottish History (1999 ed.). Parragon. ISBN 0-75253-038-0.
- Miggelbrink, Joachim (2002). McKilliop, Andrew; Murdoch, Steve (eds.). Fighting for Identity: Scottish Military Experiences c.1550-1900. Brill. ISBN 978-9004128231.
- Walton, Clifford (1896). History of the British Standing Army (2010 ed.). Nabu Press. ISBN 978-1149754764.

Military offices
Preceded by Sir Thomas Livingstone, Viscount Teviot	Commander-in-Chief, Scotland; 1702–1705	Succeeded by David Leslie, Earl of Leven
Preceded by Hon. James Douglas	Colonel of the Scots Guards; 1691–1705	Succeeded by The Marquis of Lothian
Preceded by John Wauchope	Colonel of the Third Scottish Regiment, Dutch Scots Brigade; 1688–1691	Succeeded by Sir Charles Graham
