= Peeblesshire (Parliament of Scotland constituency) =

Before the Acts of Union 1707, the barons of the shire of Peebles elected commissioners to represent them in the unicameral Parliament of Scotland and in the Convention of the Estates.

From 1708, Peeblesshire was represented by one Member of Parliament in the House of Commons of Great Britain.

== List of shire commissioners ==
- 1608 and 1609: Sir John Murray of Blackbarony
- 1617 and 1625: Sir Archibald Murray of Blackbarony
- 1621–25: Sir John Stewart of Traquair
- 1628–33: John Hay of Smithfield, Esquire of the Body
- 1628–33: 1630 convention: James Naismith of Posso
- 1630 convention, 1643, 1644–45, 1648: Laird of Dawick (Veitch)
- 1639–41: Sir Alexander Murray of Blackbarony
- 1639–41, 1644–45: David Murray of Stanehopes
- 1643: Sir James Hay of Smithfield
- 1645, 1648: Laird of Prestongrange (Morison)
- 1649-50: John Dickson of Hartrie, Senator of College of Justice
- 1649–51: Sir James Murray of Skirling
- 1661–63, 1665 convention, 1667 convention: Sir William Murray of Stanhope and Broughton
- 1661–63, 1665 convention, 1667 convention, 1669–74, 1678 convention, 1681–82, 1685–86, 1689 convention, 1689–98: Sir Archibald Murray of Blackbarony (died c.1700)
- 1678 convention: John Veitch the younger of Dawick
- 1681–82, 1689 convention, 1689–93: Sir David Murray of Stanhope and Broughton (expelled 1693)
- 1685–86: James Douglas of Skirling
- 1693–98: Alexander Murray of Halmyre
- 1700–02: Sir Alexander Murray of Blackbarony
- 1702-07: William Morison of Prestoungrange
- 1702-07: Alexander Horseburgh of that Ilk

== See also ==
- List of constituencies in the Parliament of Scotland at the time of the Union
