= James Douglas (military officer) =

17th-century Scots-born army officer

Lieutenant-General The Honourable James Douglas
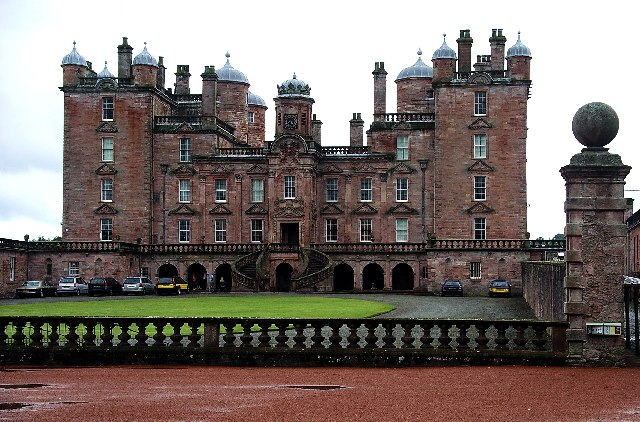
- Drumlanrig Castle, the Queensberry estate; constructed between 1679 and 1689

Commander-in-Chief, Scotland
- In office March 1688 – November 1688

Master-General of the Ordnance, Scotland
- In office October 1685 – March 1688

Member of Parliament for Peeblesshire
- In office April 1685 – June 1686

Personal details
- Born: 1645 Drumlanrig Castle, Dumfriesshire
- Died: December 1691 (aged 45–46) Namur, Spanish Netherlands

Military service
- Branch/service: Infantry
- Years of service: 1672–1691
- Rank: Lieutenant-General
- Battles/wars: Third Anglo-Dutch War; Franco-Dutch War; Maastricht; Saint-Denis (surrendered); Battle of Bothwell Bridge; Argyll's Rising; Williamite War in Ireland; The Boyne; Athlone; Nine Years' War

Lieutenant-General James Douglas (1645–1691), younger brother of the Duke of Queensberry, was a Scottish military officer, who served as Shire Commissioner for Peeblesshire in the 1685 to 1686 Parliament of Scotland.

From 1672 to 1684, he served in the French army and the Dutch Scots Brigade, before being appointed Commander in Chief for Scotland by James II. After James was replaced by William III in the November 1688 Glorious Revolution, he held a number of senior commands in the 1689–1691 Williamite War in Ireland. He was transferred to the Low Countries in late 1690 to serve in the Nine Years War, and died of fever at Namur in 1691.

== Personal details ==
James Douglas was the second son of James Douglas, 2nd Earl of Queensberry (c. 1610 – 1671) and his wife Lady Margaret Stewart. The Earl signed the 1638 National Covenant, but took little part in the 1639–1651 Wars of the Three Kingdoms; arrested in 1645 for attempting to join Montrose's Royalist campaign, he was released after paying a fine. The Douglas family largely retained its position and estates through the various changes of regime in the 17th century.

He married Anna Hamilton and they had two sons, James and William. James received a commission in his father's regiment in 1688 but resigned in October 1691 and died in 1700; William died in 1712.

== Career ==
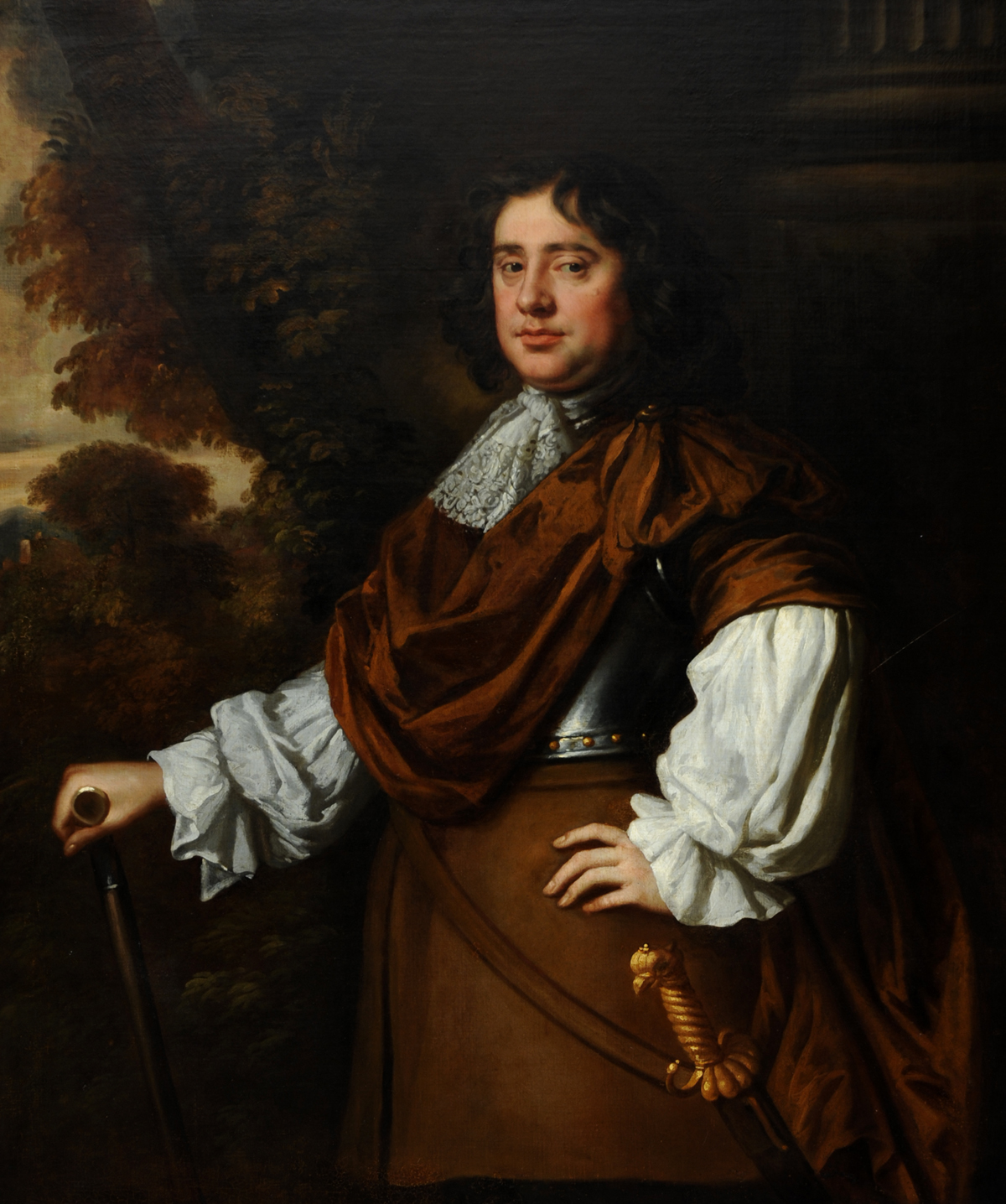
Viscount Dundee, ca 1679; a professional colleague in the Dutch States Army who later became a political opponent

As a result of the Wars of the Three Kingdoms, many in both Scotland and England viewed standing armies as a threat to individual liberty and society itself. Those who wanted a military career joined units in foreign service, such as the Dutch Scots Brigade; loyalties were often based on religion or personal relationships, with officers moving between armies. Douglas' younger brother John (1647–1675) was killed at Trier with the French army, while Robert (1650-1676) died serving with the Dutch at Maastricht.

In the 1670 Secret Treaty of Dover, Charles II signed an alliance with Louis XIV agreeing to a joint war against the Dutch Republic. Charles also undertook to supply the French army with a brigade of 6,000 men; in a secret provision not revealed until 1771, Louis agreed to pay him £230,000 per year for this. On the outbreak of the Third Anglo-Dutch War in 1672, a related conflict of the wider Franco-Dutch War, Douglas was appointed captain in a regiment commanded by William Lockhart of Lee intended as part of the expeditionary force for a proposed landing in the Dutch Republic. When this plan was cancelled in 1673, Lockhart's unit was incorporated into the British brigade fighting in the Rhineland under the command of the Duke of Monmouth, Charles' illegitimate son.

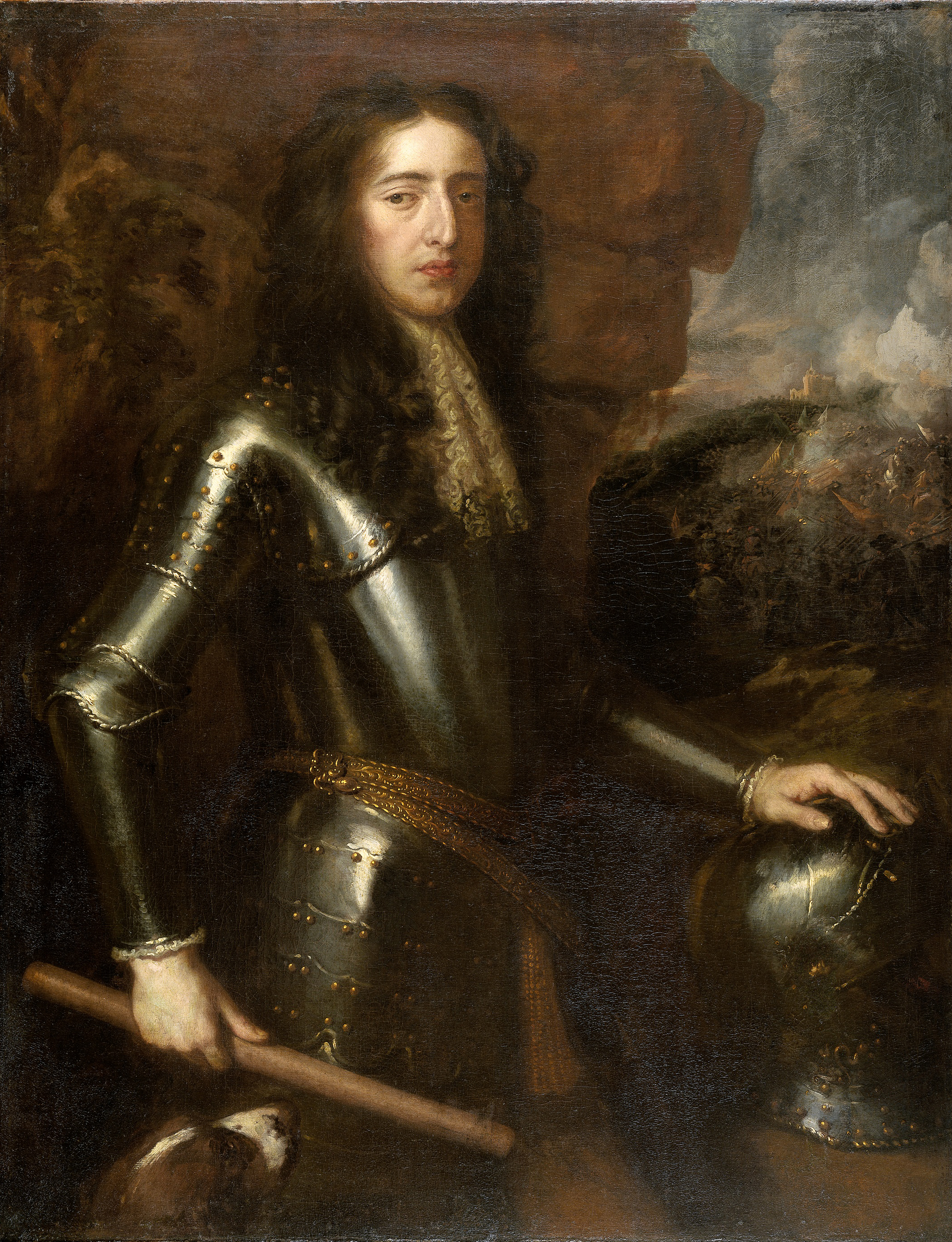
William of Orange, Douglas' commander in the Scots Brigade and post 1688.

However, the alliance with Catholic France was deeply unpopular and England withdrew from the war with the 1674 Treaty of Westminster. Despite this, the Franco-Dutch War continued and to keep his French subsidies, Charles encouraged members of the Brigade to remain in French service, although many enrolled in the Dutch Scots Brigade, including Douglas and a fellow officer from Lockhart's Regiment, John Graham, later Viscount Dundee. The Scots Brigade normally contained several English regiments, which had been withdrawn in 1672 then restored in 1674. One of these was Colyear's Regiment, which Douglas joined along with his brother Robert; he took part in the 1676 recapture of Maastricht, where Robert was killed. By 1678, he was lieutenant colonel, being wounded and taken prisoner at the battle of Saint-Denis in August 1678, shortly before the war ended. After Colyear died in March 1680, he was promoted Colonel in his place.

Douglas was in Scotland during the 1679 Covenanter rebellion, and took part in the Battle of Bothwell Bridge that ended it. As a reward, he was granted the lands of Patrick Murdock of Cumloden, one of those convicted for their participation, later tconfirmed in April 1685. Scottish politics was dominated by Douglas' elder brother, the Marquess of Queensberry, who was appointed Treasurer of Scotland in 1682. To offset his rival Dundee, who was effectively acting as military commander in Scotland, Queensberry needed a reliable subordinate; in June 1684, he persuaded the Earl of Linlithgow to step aside as Colonel of the Scots Guards in favour of his younger brother, who now returned to Scotland permanently.

When James II succeeded his brother Charles in February 1685, Douglas was elected MP for Peeblesshire in the new Parliament of Scotland. He played an active role in suppressing the June 1685 Argyll's Rising; the Tweedsmuir cemetery contains a memorial to John Hunter, cruelly murdered at Core Head by Col. James Douglas and his party for his adherence to the Word of God and Scotland’s Covenanted Work of Reformation 1685. In October, William Drummond, Viscount Strathallan was appointed Commander-in-Chief, Scotland, with Douglas as Master-General of the Ordnance. Douglas took over when Strathallan died in March 1688 but it is not clear whether he was ever officially appointed Commander-in-chief and operational control was largely exercised by Dundee.

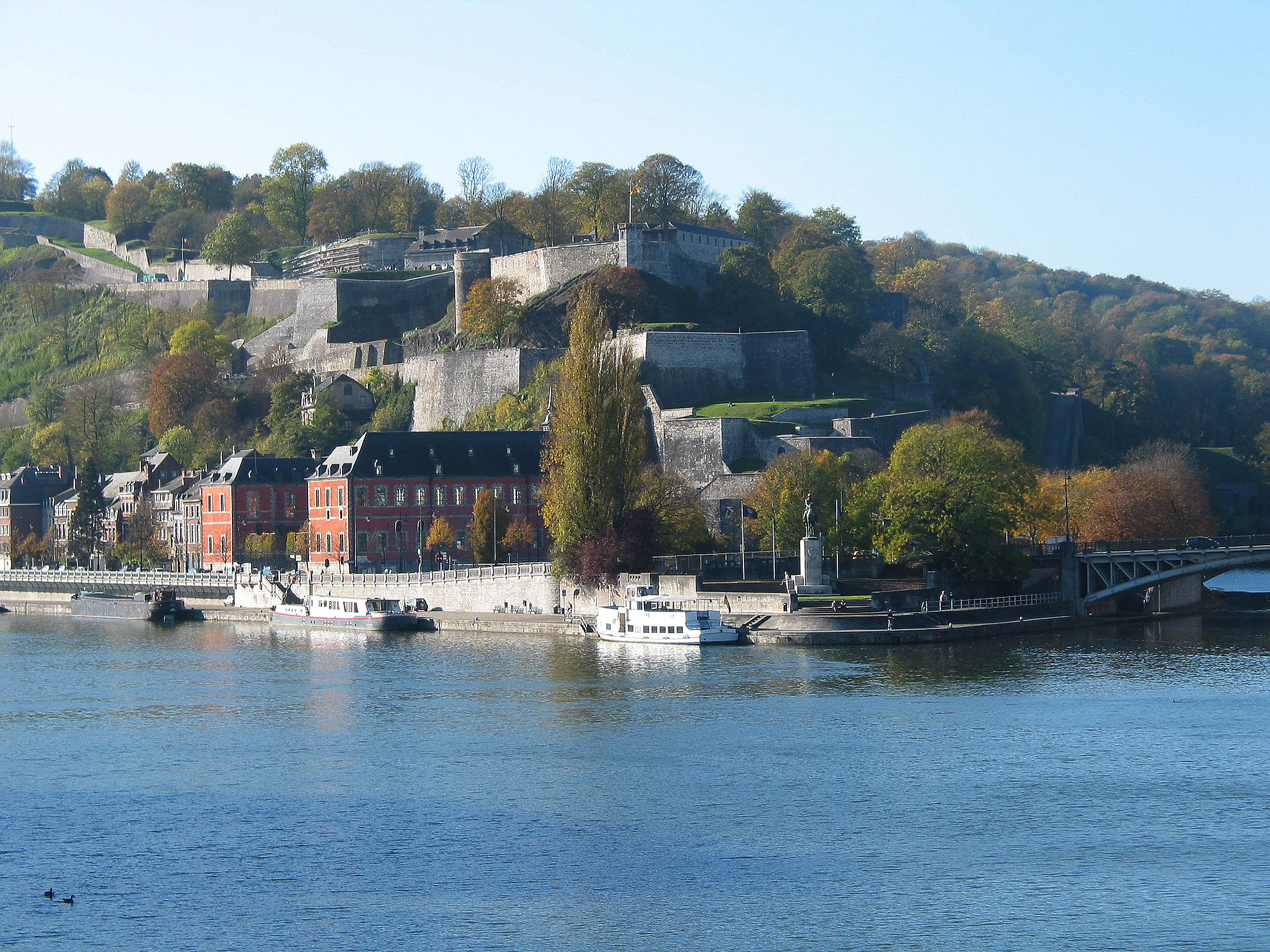
Namur, on the Meuse, where Douglas died of fever in 1691

In 1685, many in both England and Scotland supported James despite his personal Catholicism from fear of civil war if he were bypassed; by July 1688, anti-Catholic riots made it seem only his removal could prevent one. Just before the 1688 Glorious Revolution, the Scottish army was brought south to join the rest of James' forces in England. After William III of England landed in Brixham on 5 November, his troops deserted and he went into exile on 23 December. When James II invaded Ireland in March 1689, Douglas joined the army in Ireland and was formally replaced as Commander in Scotland by Sir Hugh Mackay, another former colleague.

He commanded a brigade at the Battle of the Boyne in July 1690, and supervised the unsuccessful Siege of Athlone, whose failure William considered a missed opportunity to end the war in Ireland. He felt this was partially due to conflict between Douglas and two other senior British officers, Percy Kirke and Sir John Lanier. As a result, in May 1691 they were posted to the Low Countries to serve in the Nine Years War, where they could be supervised by William himself. All three died within a year, Kirke of disease at Brussels in October 1691, Lanier at Steenkerque in August 1692, while Douglas died at Namur in July 1691. He was succeeded as Colonel of the Scots Guards by George Ramsay, another former Scots Brigade colleague.

== Sources ==
- Balfour, James (1910). The Scots Peerage.
- British Empire. "Colonels in the 3rd Regiment of Footguards". British Empire.
- Childs, John (1974). "Monmouth and the Army of Flanders". Journal of the Society for Army Historical Research. 52 (209): 3–12. JSTOR 44223058.
- Childs, John (1994). Chandler, Beckett (ed.). The Restoration Army 1660–1702 in The Oxford History of the British Army (1996 ed.). OUP. ISBN 978-0192803115.
- Childs, John (1987). The British Army of William III, 1689–1702. Manchester University Press. ISBN 978-0719025525.
- Childs, John (1984). "The British Brigade in France 1672–1678". History. 69 (227): 384–397. doi:10.1111/j.1468-229X.1984.tb01427.x. JSTOR 24419689.
- Childs, John (2008). The Williamite Wars in Ireland. Bloomsbury 3PL. ISBN 978-1847251640.
- Dalton, Charles (1909). The Scots Army 1661–1688. Eyre & Spottiswoode.
- Davenport, Frances Gardiner (1917). European Treaties bearing on the History of the United States and its Dependencies.
- Debrett, John (1814). Peerage of the United Kingdom; Volume II, Scotland and Ireland. F. C. and J. Rivington and others.
- Dumfries and Galloway Council. "The Killing Times" (PDF). Southern Upland Way. Archived from the original (PDF) on 14 October 2018.
- Ford, JD (2004). "Douglas, William, first duke of Queensberry (1637–1695)". Oxford Dictionary of National Biography (online ed.). Oxford University Press. doi:10.1093/ref:odnb/7936. (Subscription, Wikipedia Library access or UK public library membership required.)
- Harris, Tim (2007). Revolution; the Great Crisis of the British Monarchy 1685–1720. Penguin. ISBN 978-0141016528.
- Kenyon, J. P. (1993) [1986]. The History Men: The Historical Profession in England since the Renaissance. Weidenfeld & Nicolson.
- Lynn, John (1996). The Wars of Louis XIV, 1667–1714 (Modern Wars in Perspective). Longman. ISBN 978-0582056299.
- Le Neve, John (2015) [1712]. Memoirs British and Foreign, of the Lives and Families of the Most Illustrious Persons. Arkose Press. ISBN 978-1345713763.;
- Linklater, Magnus (2004). "Graham, John, first viscount of Dundee [known as Bonnie Dundee]". Oxford Dictionary of National Biography (online ed.). Oxford University Press. doi:10.1093/ref:odnb/11208. (Subscription, Wikipedia Library access or UK public library membership required.)
- Macpherson, James (1775). Original Papers: Containing the Secret History of Great Britain (2017 ed.). Hansebooks. ISBN 978-3-7434-3572-8.
- Wormsley, David (2015). James II: The Last Catholic King. Allen Lane. ISBN 978-0141977065.

Military offices
Preceded by Viscount Strathallan	Commander-in-Chief, Scotland; April 1688–December 1688	Succeeded by Hugh Mackay
Preceded by The Earl of Linlithgow	Colonel of the Scots Regiment of Foot Guards; 1684–1691	Succeeded by Hon. George Ramsay
Preceded by Alexander Colyear	Colonel of the Third Scottish Regiment, Dutch Scots Brigade; 1680–1684	Succeeded by John Wauchope
