= Saint-Denis, Mons =

Sub-municipality of the city of Mons, Belgium

Saint-Denis Sint-Dnis (Walloon)
- Sub-municipality of Mons
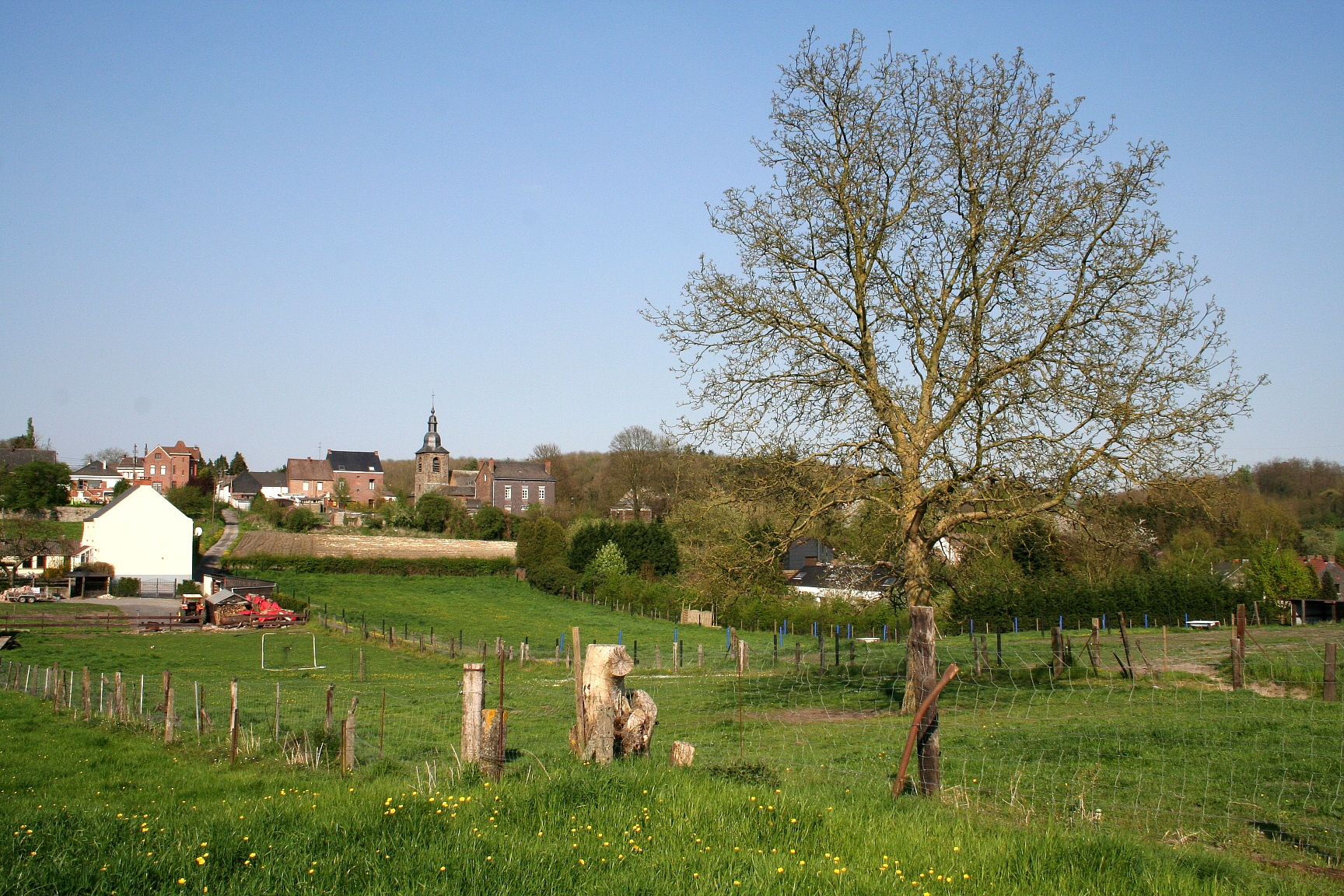
- The village in the spring

- Coat of arms

- Location of Saint-Denis in Mons
- Interactive map of Saint-Denis
- Location within Belgium Location within Hainaut (Belgium)
- Coordinates: 50°29′31″N 4°01′05″E
- Country: Belgium
- Community: French Community
- Region: Wallonia
- Province: Hainaut
- Arrondissement: Mons
- Municipality: Mons
- Postal codes: 7034
- Area codes: 065

Saint-Denis (French pronunciation: [sɛ̃ dəni]; Walloon: Sint-Dnis) is a sub-municipality of the city of Mons located in the province of Hainaut, Wallonia, Belgium. It was a separate municipality until 1964. In 1964, it was merged into Obourg. On 1 January 1972, Obourg was merged into Mons.

== Gallery ==
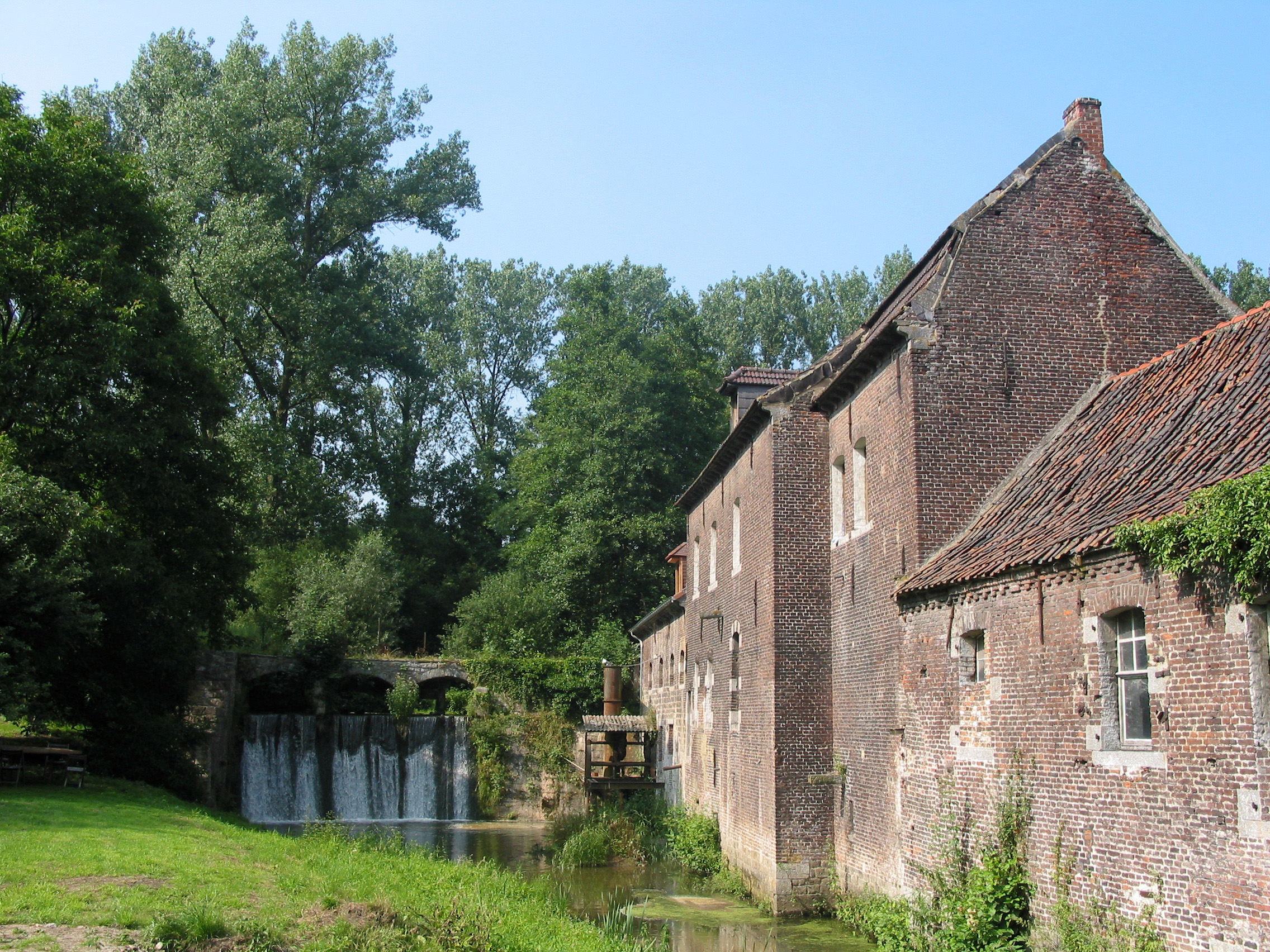
Water mill (18th century).

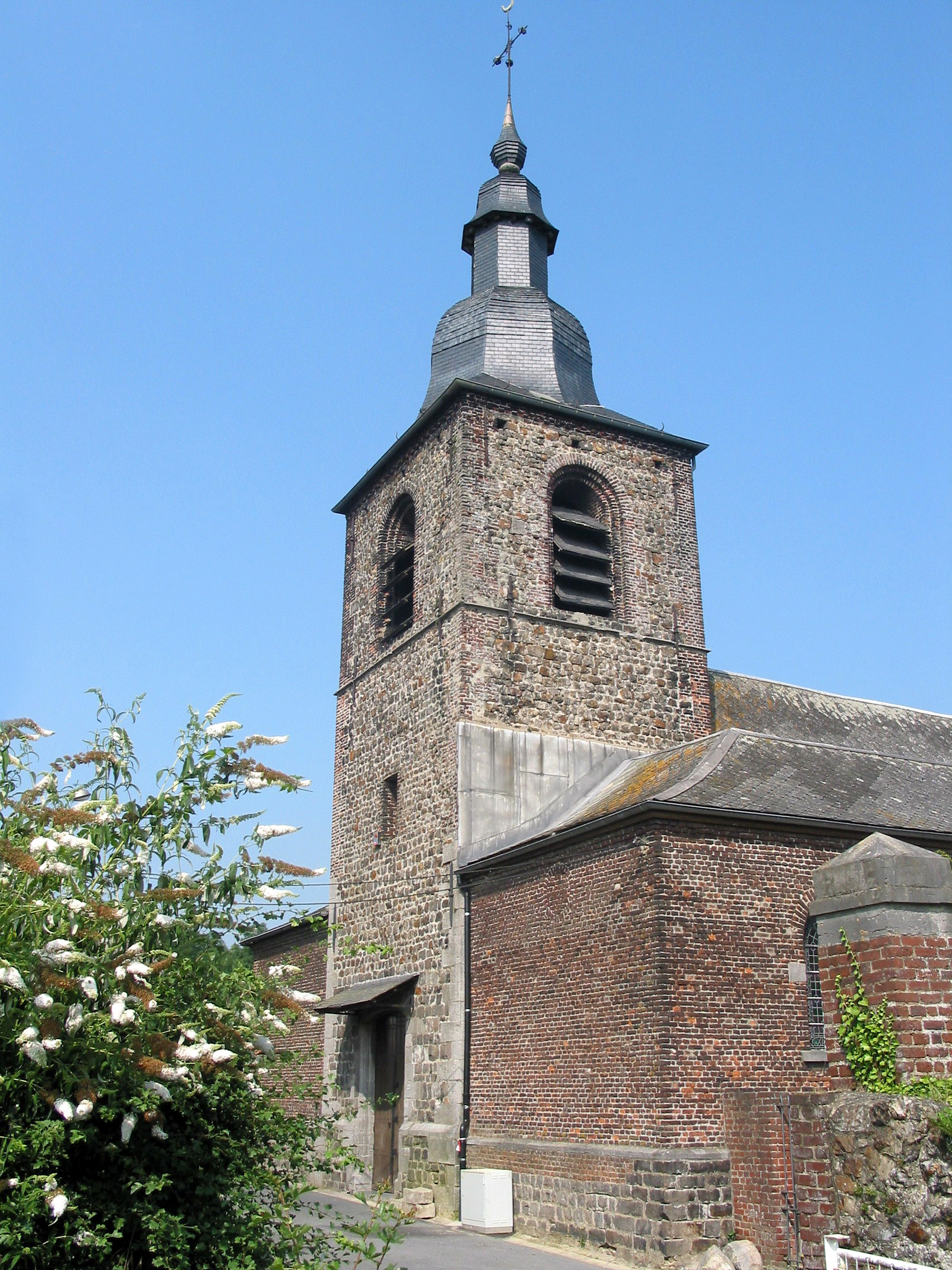
Church.

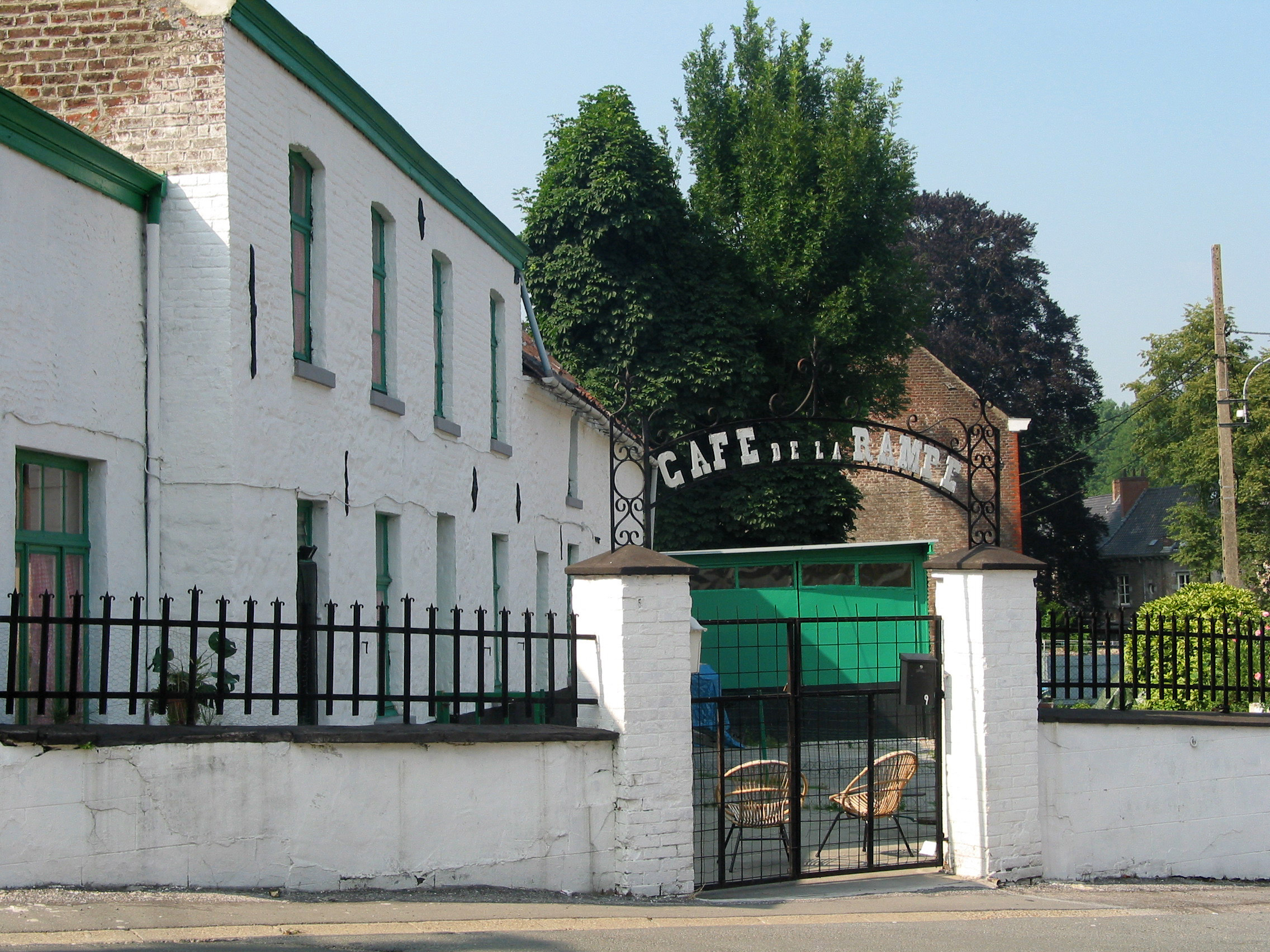
The « Café de la Rampe ».

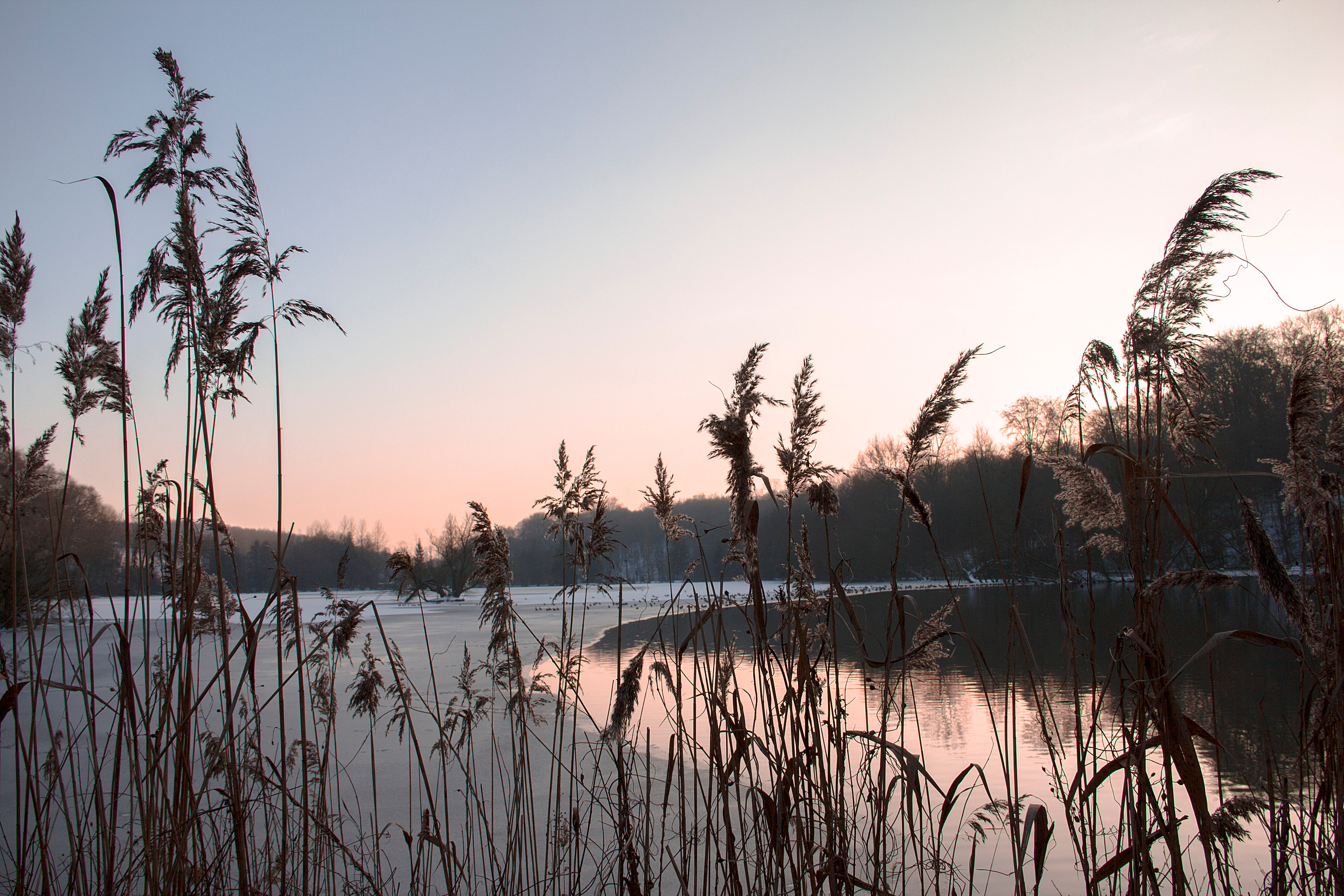
Pond.

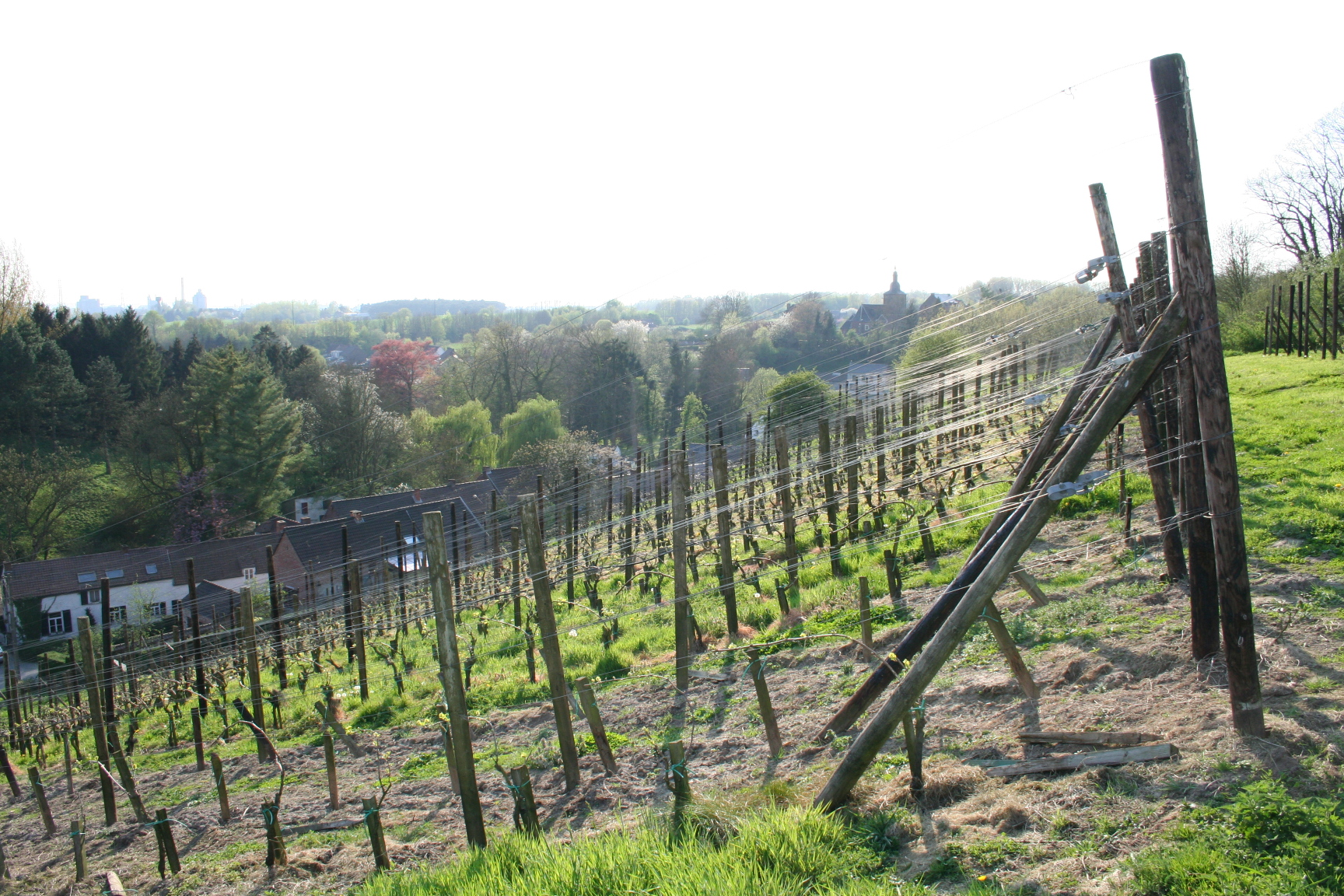
Vineyard.

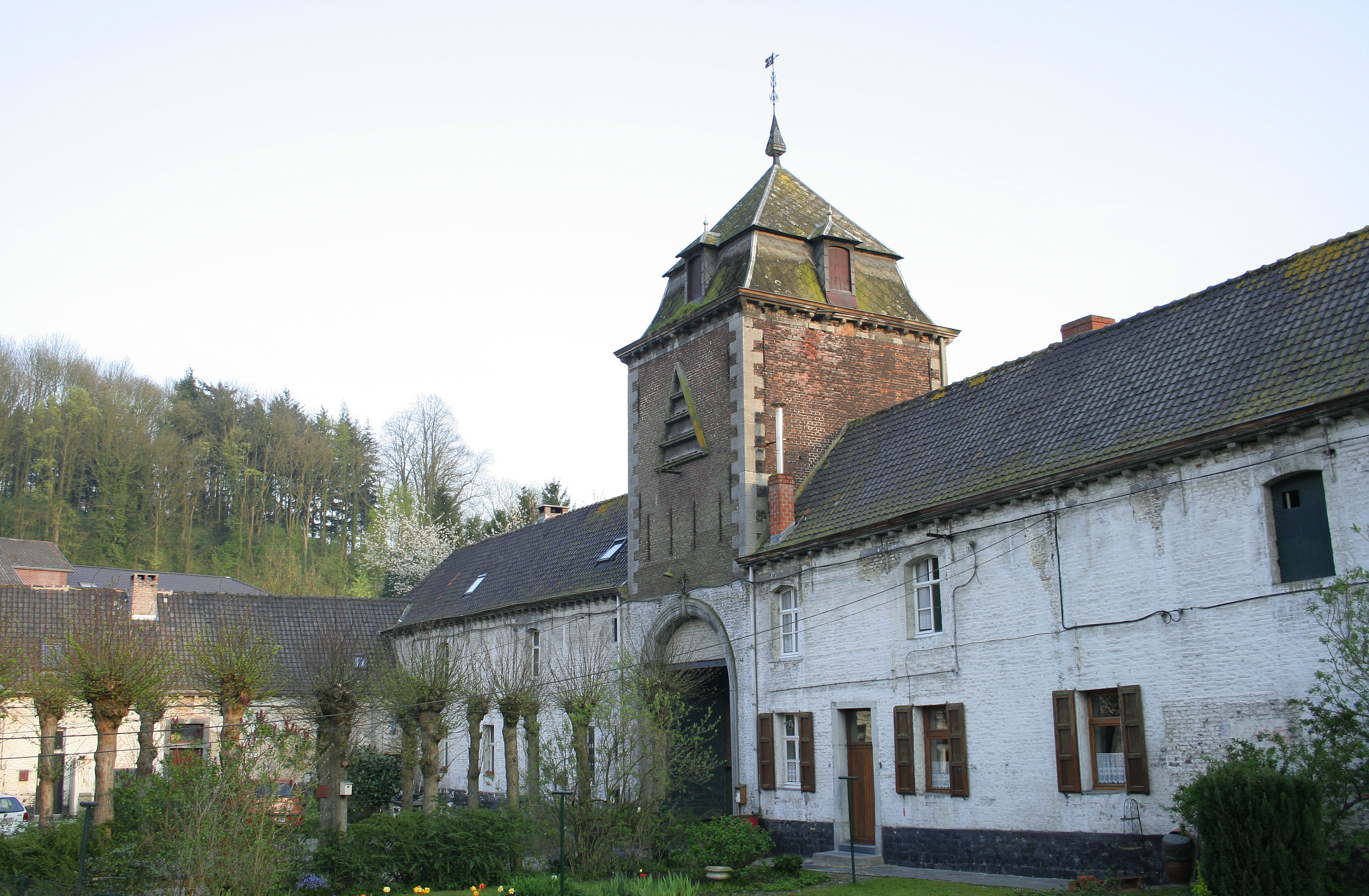
Abbey Farm.
