= Siege of Athlone (1690) =

Irish Williamite-Jacobite War battle

- Part of the Williamite War in Ireland
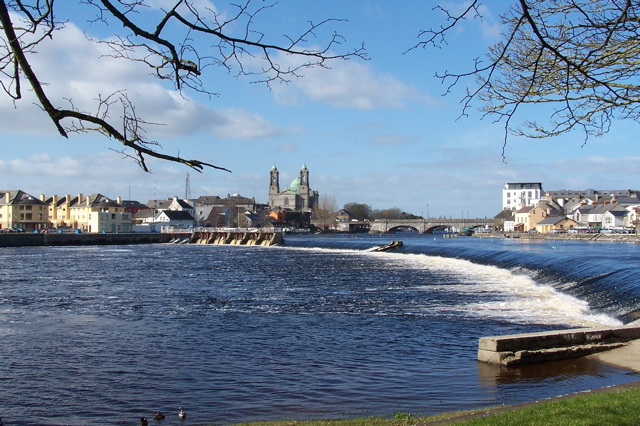
Date	17 – 24 July 1690 (1 week)
Location	Athlone, Ireland 53°26′00″N 7°57′00″W
Result	Jacobite victory

Belligerents
Jacobites; France	Williamites; Dutch Republic

Commanders and leaders
Richard Grace	James Douglas

Strength
4,500	12,000

Casualties and losses
Unknown	400 casualties

The siege of Athlone was part of the Williamite War in Ireland between the supporters of King James II, who were known as Jacobites, and the supporters of King William of Orange. The siege began on 17 July 1690, when Williamite Lieutenant-General James Douglas arrived outside the Jacobite held city of Athlone with ten regiments of foot and five regiments of horse for a total force of 12,000. The Governor of Athlone, Colonel Richard Grace decided to defend the western part of the city. The Jacobite troops destroyed the bridge over the Shannon River that connected the eastern and western parts of the city, before the Williamite Army arrived. The city's garrison consisted of three regiments of foot and eleven troops of horse for a total force of about 4,500.

General Douglas sent a messenger to Colonel Grace demanding he surrender the city. Colonel Grace responded by firing a pistol shot over the head of the messenger and stating "These are my terms; these only, I will give or receive, and when my provisions are consumed, I will defend till I eat my old boots." General Douglas commenced a bombardment of the city with twelve cannon and two mortars, the city of Athlone's guns returned fire. After two days the Williamite Army attempted to ford the Shannon River but were repelled with considerable loss. The artillery fire continued between the two sides until 24 July when General Douglas was forced to retire having suffered about 400 casualties, lacking provisions and equipment for a longer siege and having heard rumors that Patrick Sarsfield and the Jacobite Cavalry were en route to relieve the city of Athlone's garrison.

Although the Jacobites withstood the week long siege, a year later the Williamite Army returned and took the city. Governor Richard Grace died defending the city during the 2nd siege of Athlone in 1691.
