= Battle of Saint-Denis (1678) =

1678 battle

- Part of the Franco-Dutch War
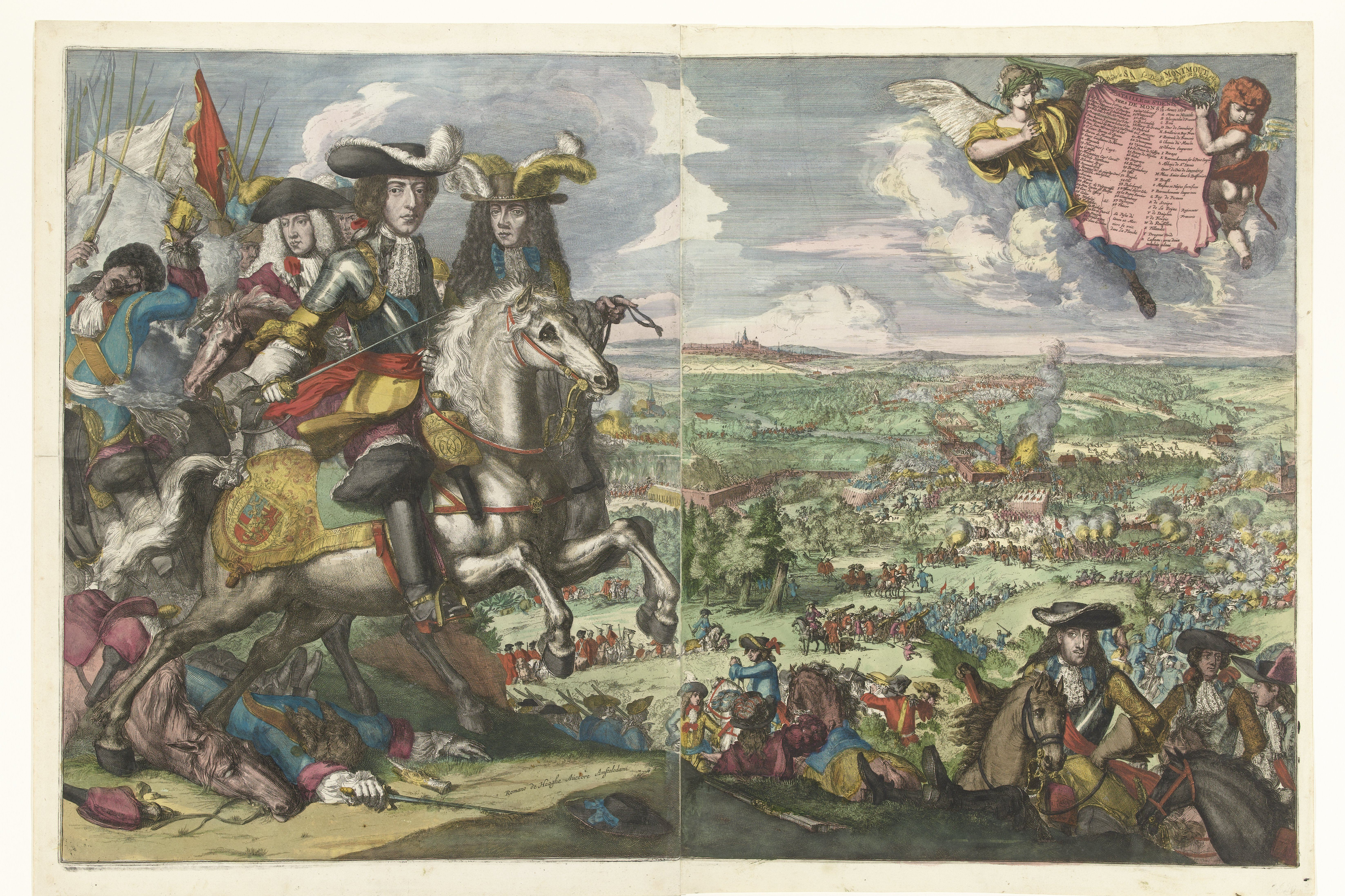
- Battle of Saint-Denis by Romeyn de Hooghe
Date	14 August 1678
Location	Saint-Denis, near Mons, modern Belgium 50.4833°N 4.0167°E
Result	See § Aftermath

Belligerents
France	Dutch Republic; Spain

Commanders and leaders
(Kingdom of France) Luxembourg (Kingdom of France) Villeroy (Kingdom of France) Montal	(Dutch Republic) William III (Dutch Republic) Waldeck (Spain) Villahermosa

Strength
40,000–50,000	35,000–45,000

Casualties and losses
2,500 to 4,000	3,000 to 5,000

The Battle of Saint-Denis was the last major action of the 1672 to 1678 Franco-Dutch War. It took place on 14 August 1678, four days after Louis XIV of France had agreed the Treaty of Nijmegen with the Dutch Republic, but before he finalised terms with Spain. The Dutch and Spanish initiated the battle to prevent the French capturing the Spanish-held town of Mons, then on the border between France and the Spanish Netherlands. The result was disputed, as both sides claimed victory.

Leaving a small force to maintain the siege of Mons, French commander Luxembourg concentrated 40,000 to 50,000 men around the nearby villages of Saint-Dénis and Casteau, where they were attacked by a combined Dutch-Spanish army of 35,000 to 45,000 men led by William of Orange.

In the early stages, the Allies overran the French flanks and forced Luxembourg out of his headquarters in the abbey of Saint-Dénis, but were then pushed back by a series of counter attacks, with many positions changing hands several times. Fighting continued late into the evening, when William pulled his troops back to regroup, leaving the French occupying most of their original lines.

The exception was Saint-Denis, whose loss left the French position untenable. When the Allies resumed their attack early next morning, they found Luxembourg had withdrawn overnight and abandoned the siege of Mons. As a result, the town remained Spanish under the treaty agreed with Louis XIV on 17 September.

== Background ==
The Spanish Netherlands and Northern France in 1678; key locations

France viewed possession of the Spanish Netherlands as essential for its security and trade and occupied much of it in the War of Devolution (1667-68). Having won its independence in 1648, the Dutch Republic preferred a weakened Spain as a neighbour, rather than an aggressive and expansionist France. As a result, the Dutch-led Triple Alliance forced Louis XIV to return most of his gains in the 1668 Treaty of Aix-la-Chapelle. Thereafter, Louis decided the best way to force concessions from the Dutch was by first defeating them.

Initially supported by England, the Franco-Dutch War began in May 1672; French troops quickly overran much of the Netherlands, but by July the Dutch position had stabilised. Success encouraged Louis to make excessive demands, while concern at French advances brought the Dutch support from Brandenburg-Prussia, Emperor Leopold, and Charles II of Spain. In August 1673, an Imperial army entered the Rhineland; facing war on multiple fronts, the French abandoned most of their Dutch gains to focus elsewhere, retaining only Grave and Maastricht. In January 1674, Denmark joined the anti-French coalition, while in February England left the war via the Treaty of Westminster.

In the first part of 1674, Louis focused on recapturing Franche-Comté, a process completed by the end of June, after which French troops were transferred to Condé's army in the Spanish Netherlands. Both sides suffered heavy losses in the Battle of Seneffe on 11 August, which confirmed Louis' preference for positional warfare, with siege and manoeuvre dominating in this theatre thereafter. The peace talks that began at Nijmegen in 1676 were given a greater sense of urgency in November 1677 when William of Orange married his cousin Mary, Charles II of England's niece. An Anglo-Dutch defensive alliance followed in March 1678, (Note: England agreed to provide an expeditionary force of 11,000 men, and the two sides undertook to impose a peace under which France would restore Charleroi, Oudenarde, Tournai and Valenciennes) although English troops did not arrive in significant numbers until late May. The delay allowed Louis to improve his negotiating position by capturing Ypres and Ghent in early March, before signing a peace treaty with the Dutch on 10 August.

== Battle ==
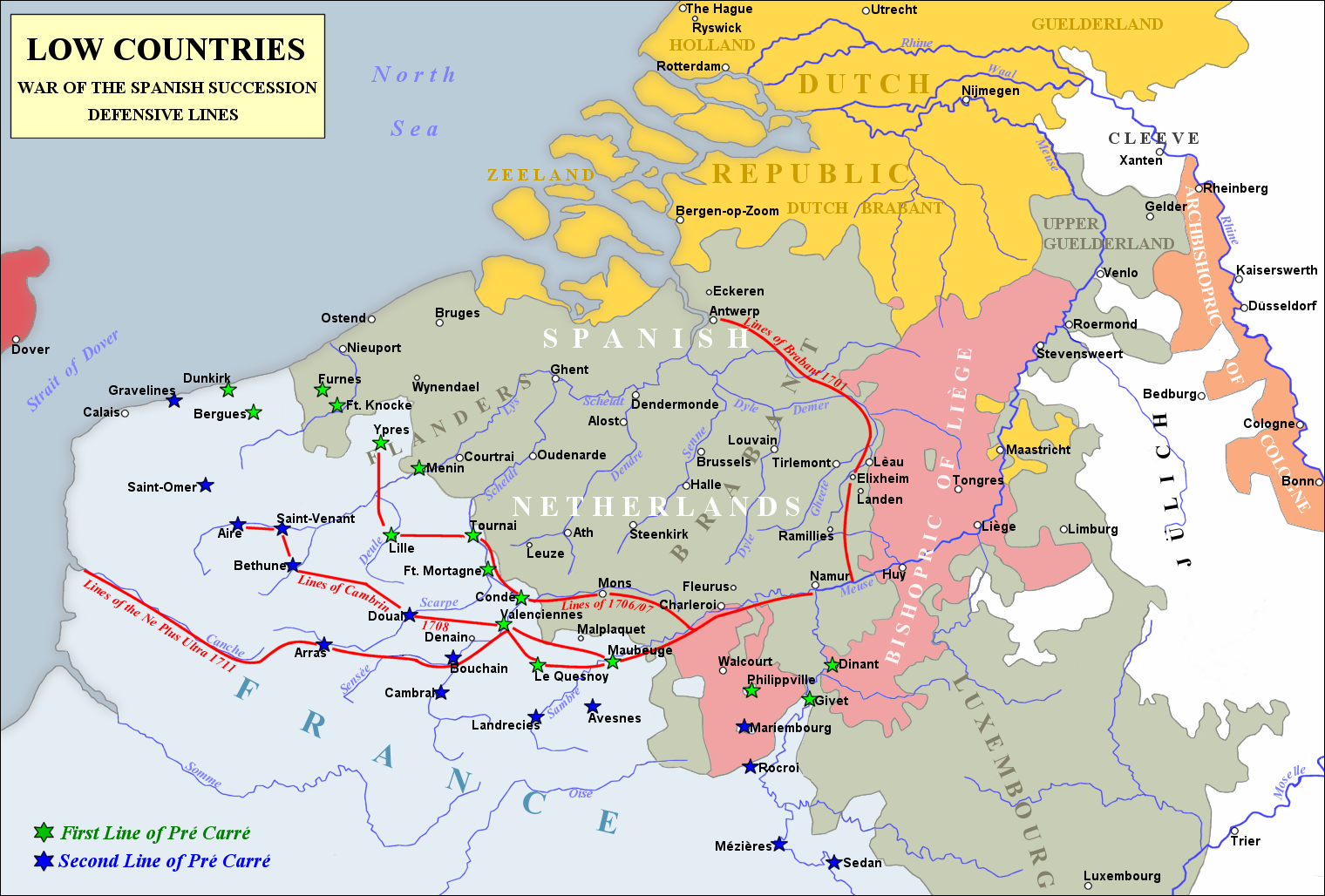
Vauban's pré carré line of fortresses; green = first line, blue = second line

French strategy was driven by Vauban's pré carré plan, a double-line of fortresses to protect their northern borders (See Map). Mons was the most significant position still held by the Spanish; although the Dutch had agreed terms with France, Spain had not yet done so, and the delay provided an opportunity to capture it.

During the March offensive that secured Ypres and Ghent, a French force under de Montal was based at Saint-Ghislain and Marville to blockade Mons. In late June, Louis instructed Luxembourg to continue the blockade, but remain on the defensive, while pulling most of his troops back to the French border. However, when the Allies persisted in trying to relieve Mons, he finally authorised Luxembourg to accept battle, hoping to inflict enough casualties to force the Dutch to make peace.

On 12 August, Luxembourg and his army of 40,000-50,000 was camped in the nearby villages of Saint-Denis and Casteau, with a combined Dutch and Spanish force of 35,000-45,000 based at Soignies, about three hours march away. Although William and Villahermosa knew the Dutch were close to agreeing terms, they decided to attack, since the war with Spain continued and preventing the loss of Mons benefitted both of them. Luxembourg, who was based in the Abbey de St Denis, an important exposed position in front of the French right wing, reportedly learned the Treaty had been signed that same morning. However, this is disputed and other historians suggest neither he or William knew peace had been formally agreed when they fought the battle.

His strong position meant Luxembourg did not anticipate an attack by William, a belief reinforced by his scouts. Believing the main Allied objective was to attack the French siege works on the other bank of the River Haine, he assumed any assault on his lines must be a diversion. As a result, when Dutch dragoons under Sir Alexander Colyear occupied the wooded heights around Saint Denis and drove back the French outposts, Luxembourg did nothing to assist them.

By 14:00, the Allied troops were in position, and William ordered a simultaneous assault on Luxembourg's left and right flanks. When Villeroy, who was in charge of Saint Denis, reported the Allies were advancing on the Abbey, Luxembourg ordered his artillery and baggage train to withdraw towards de Montal's positions at Saint-Ghislain. About 15:00, Dutch troops under Count Waldeck captured the Abbey despite heavy losses, William's secretary later noting some 300 to 400 corpses littering the ground in front. They then drove the French back to the creek, which ran through the battlefield, but Allied attempts to cross it and break Villeroy's front line ultimately failed. At the same time, Spanish and Dutch infantry, which included the Scots Brigade, attacked Casteau and captured most of the village.

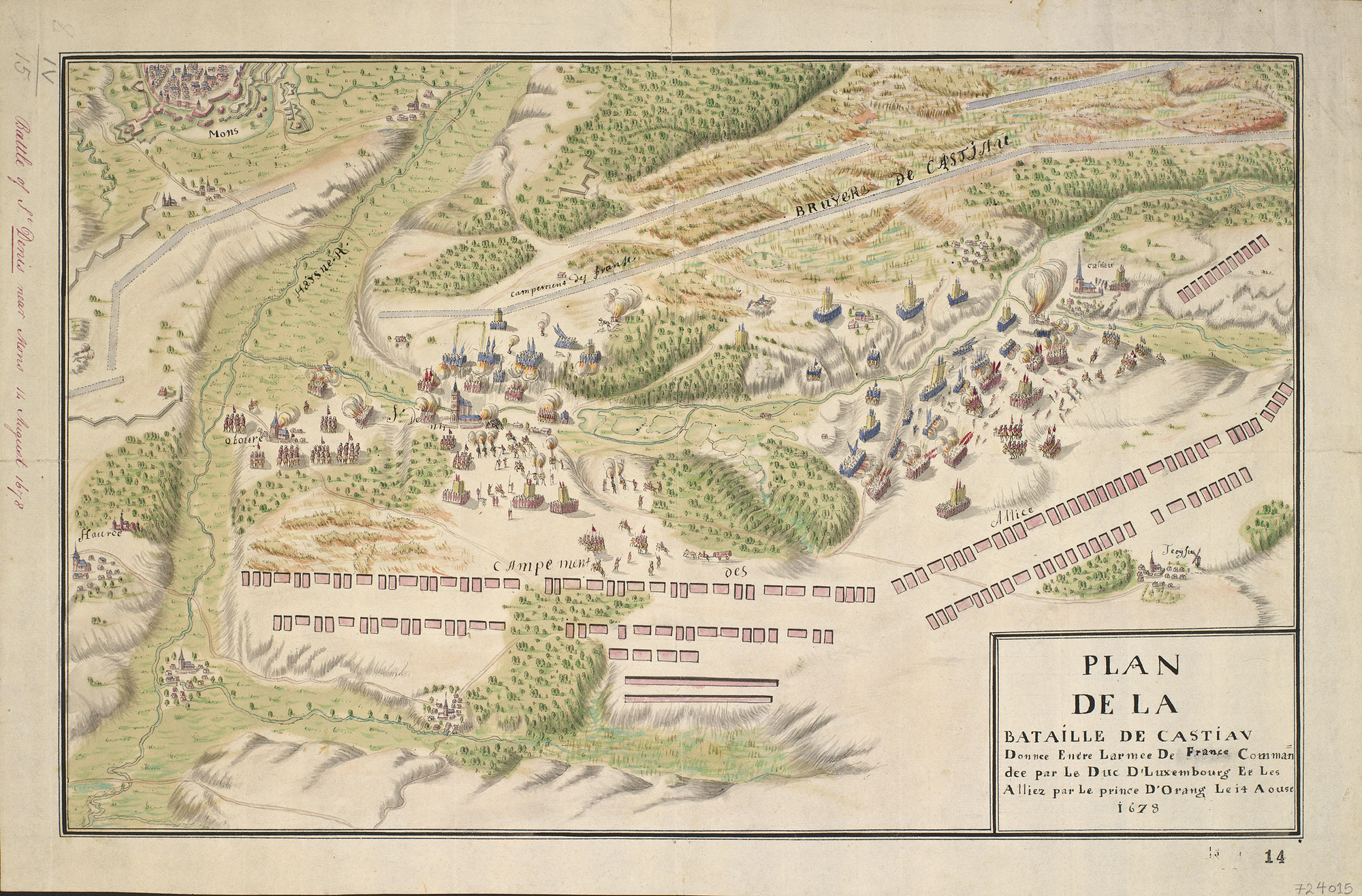
A map of the battle with Saint-Denis on the left and Casteau on the right.

Once Luxembourg realised this was not a feint, he committed his reserves to the battle for Casteau, which lasted over five hours, during which the church, mill and chateau changed hands several times. Both sides suffered heavy casualties in fierce hand-to-hand fighting; Luxembourg was wounded, while William was reportedly saved by future Marshal Hendrik Overkirk, who killed a French dragoon with his pistol against the Prince's chest. Around 19:00, William ordered his infantry in Casteau to withdraw, covered by the Spanish cavalry and a rearguard in Casteau which then did the same, apart from a regiment of French Huguenots exiles holding the chateau. Commanded by a former French regular officer, M de La Roque-Servière, they continued fighting until over-run just after 21:00, when the fight around Casteau ended. By then it had become completely dark and even at Saint-Dénis, where neither side had gained further ground, the fire died down around 22:00.

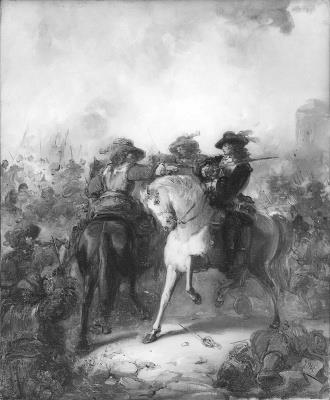
Hendrik Overkirk saves William of Orange from a French dragoon, by Jacob de Vos

French casualties were around 4,000 killed or wounded, including 689 in the elite Gardes Francaises, those of the Allies roughly equal or slightly higher at 5,000 in total. Other sources put French losses at about 2,500 in total, those of the Allies being in the region of 3,000. The only British troops involved were the six regiments of the Dutch Scots Brigade commanded by the Earl of Ossory, with some 25% of their officers killed or wounded. Although the commander of the British expeditionary force, James Scott, 1st Duke of Monmouth, was present with his staff and took part in a number of cavalry charges, his brigade was still en route from Ostend.

Most of the French casualties were incurred by the thirteen infantry regiments who took part in the fighting around Casteau and St Denis and their effectiveness was much diminished. More importantly, however, the French had been unable to retake Saint-Denis. This meant that the French positions were no longer tenable. The link with his besieging force was now seriously threatened and Luxembourg therefore decided not to await a second attack. Around 23:00, Luxembourg ordered his troops back over the River Hain to his rear and having destroyed the bridges behind them, rejoined the besieging force outside Mons. The Allies did not discover this until the next morning, but the hasty retreat meant Luxembourg left behind his wounded and part of the baggage train.

== Aftermath ==
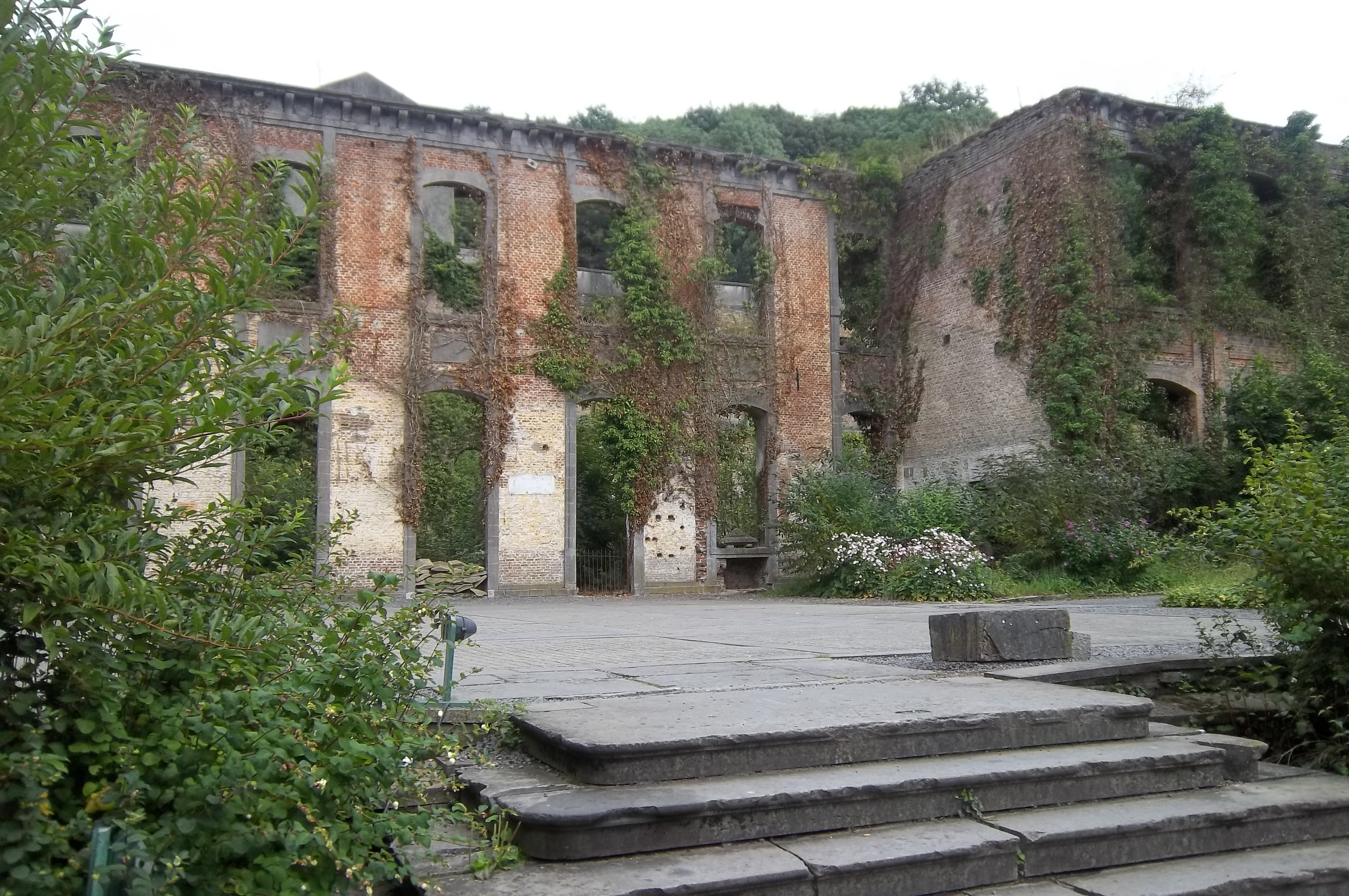
Ruins of the Abbey St Denis, Luxembourg's headquarters, taken by the Dutch in the first assault

As with many other battles of the period, both sides claimed victory, Luxembourg doing so on the grounds he had successfully repulsed the Allied assaults, suffered fewer casualties and retained most of his original positions. In contrast, William argued he had pulled his troops back only to reorganise for another attempt, and when they resumed the attack early on the morning of 15 August, they found the French had abandoned the battlefield. Under the conventions then prevailing, both sides had a case but the immediate effect was that William resumed his march on Mons once the bridges had been repaired. On arrival, he found Luxembourg had already lifted the siege and retreated behind the French border, which meant the Allies achieved their strategic objective of ensuring the town remained in Spanish hands. As a consequence, the result is disputed; it has been described as a French victory, a narrow Allied defeat, inconclusive or an Allied victory.

Spain and France agreed an armistice on 19 August, with a formal peace treaty signed on 17 September. France returned Charleroi, Ghent and other towns in the Spanish Netherlands, but Spain ceded Ypres, Maubeuge, Câteau-Cambrésis, Valenciennes, Saint-Omer and Cassel; with the exception of Ypres, all of these remain part of modern France.

== Sources ==
- Childs, John (1974). "Monmouth and the Army of Flanders". Journal of the Society for Army Historical Research. 52 (209): 3–12. JSTOR 44223058.
- Davenport, Frances (1917). European Treaties bearing on the History of the United States and its Dependencies. Washington, D.C. Carnegie Institution of Washington.
- Dupuy, Richard Ernest; Dupuy, Trevor (1993). The Harper's Encyclopedia of Military History from 3500 B.C. to the Present. HarperCollins Publishers.
- Ede-Borrett, Stephen (2003). "Casualties in the Anglo-Dutch Brigade at the battle of St Denis August 1678". Journal of the Society for Army Historical Research. 81 (327). JSTOR 44230964.
- Frey, Linda; Frey, Marsha (1995). The Treaties of the War of the Spanish Succession: An Historical and Critical Dictionary. Greenwood. ISBN 978-0313278846.
- Hutton, Ronald (1989). Charles II King of England, Scotland and Ireland. Clarendon Press. ISBN 978-0198229117.
- Kossmann, E.H. (1975). "The Dutch Republic". In Carsten, F.L. (ed.). The New Cambridge Modern History. Vol. V: The Ascendancy of France: 1648-88. Cambridge University Press.
- Lesaffer, Randall. "The Wars of Louis XIV in Treaties (Part V): The Peace of Nijmegen (1678–1679)". Oxford Public International Law.
- Lynn, John (1999). The Wars of Louis XIV, 1667-1714 (Modern Wars In Perspective). Longman. ISBN 978-0582056299.
- Macintosh, Claude Truman (1973). French Diplomacy during the War of Devolution, the Triple Alliance and the Treaty of Aix-la-Chapelle (PhD). Ohio State University.
- Nimwegen, Olaf van (2010). The Dutch Army and the Military Revolutions, 1588-1688. Boydell & Brewer. ISBN 978-1843835752.
- Nimwegen, Olaf van (2020). De Veertigjarige Oorlog 1672-1712: de strijd van de Nederlanders tegen de Zonnekoning (in Dutch). Prometheus. ISBN 978-9044638714.
- Nolan, Cathal J (2008). Wars of the age of Louis XIV, 1650–1715. ABC-CLIO. ISBN 978-0-313-33046-9.
- Périni, Hardÿ de (1896). Batailles françaises, Volume V (in French). Ernest Flammarion, Paris.
- Muller, Pieter Nicolaas (1882). "Willem III en de slag van Saint Dénis (1678)". De Gids. 46.
- Israel, Jonathan (1995). The Dutch Republic: Its Rise, Greatness, and Fall 1477–1806. Oxford: Clarendon Press. ISBN 0-19-873072-1.
