= Reutlingen (Bundestag electoral district) =

Federal electoral district of Germany

289 Reutlingen
- Electoral district for the Bundestag
- Reutlingen in 2025
- State: Baden-Württemberg
- Population: 287,000 (2019)
- Electorate: 199,189 (2021)
- Major settlements: Reutlingen; Metzingen; Pfullingen
- Area: 1,092.5 km^{2}

Current electoral district
- Created: 1949
- Party: CDU
- Member: Michael Donth
- Elected: 2013, 2017, 2021, 2025

Reutlingen is an electoral constituency (German: Wahlkreis) represented in the Bundestag. It elects one member via first-past-the-post voting. Under the current constituency numbering system, it is designated as constituency 289. It is located in central Baden-Württemberg, comprising the Reutlingen district.

Reutlingen was created for the inaugural 1949 federal election. Since 2013, it has been represented by Michael Donth of the Christian Democratic Union (CDU).

== Geography ==
Reutlingen is located in central Baden-Württemberg. As of the 2021 federal election, it is coterminous with the Reutlingen district.

== History ==
Reutlingen was created in 1949. In the 1949 election, it was Württemberg-Hohenzollern constituency 1 in the numbering system. In the 1953 through 1961 elections, it was number 190. In the 1965 through 1976 elections, it was number 194. In the 1980 through 1998 elections, it was number 193. In the 2002 and 2005 elections, it was number 290. Since the 2009 election, it has been number 289.

Originally, the constituency comprised the districts of Reutlingen and Tübingen. In the 1965 through 1976 elections, it comprised the Tübingen district and the municipalities of Reutlingen, Eningen unter Achalm, Sonnenbühl, Gomaringen, Engstingen, Lichtenstein, Metzingen, Pfullingen, Riederich, and Wannweil from the Reutlingen district. Since the 1980 election, it has been coterminous with the Reutlingen district.

Election	No.	Name	Borders
1949	1	Reutlingen	Reutlingen district; Tübingen district
1953	190	Reutlingen	Reutlingen district; Tübingen district
1957	190	Reutlingen	Reutlingen district; Tübingen district
1961	190	Reutlingen	Reutlingen district; Tübingen district
1965	194	Reutlingen	Reutlingen district (only Reutlingen, Eningen unter Achalm, Sonnenbühl, Gomaringen, Engstingen, Lichtenstein, Metzingen, Pfullingen, Riederich, and Wannweil municipalities); Tübingen district
1969	194	Reutlingen	Reutlingen district (only Reutlingen, Eningen unter Achalm, Sonnenbühl, Gomaringen, Engstingen, Lichtenstein, Metzingen, Pfullingen, Riederich, and Wannweil municipalities); Tübingen district
1972	194	Reutlingen	Reutlingen district (only Reutlingen, Eningen unter Achalm, Sonnenbühl, Gomaringen, Engstingen, Lichtenstein, Metzingen, Pfullingen, Riederich, and Wannweil municipalities); Tübingen district
1976	194	Reutlingen	Reutlingen district (only Reutlingen, Eningen unter Achalm, Sonnenbühl, Gomaringen, Engstingen, Lichtenstein, Metzingen, Pfullingen, Riederich, and Wannweil municipalities); Tübingen district
1980	193	Reutlingen	Reutlingen district
1983	193	Reutlingen	Reutlingen district
1987	193	Reutlingen	Reutlingen district
1990	193	Reutlingen	Reutlingen district
1994	193	Reutlingen	Reutlingen district
1998	193	Reutlingen	Reutlingen district
2002	290	Reutlingen	Reutlingen district
2005	290	Reutlingen	Reutlingen district
2009	289	Reutlingen	Reutlingen district
2013	289	Reutlingen	Reutlingen district
2017	289	Reutlingen	Reutlingen district
2021	289	Reutlingen	Reutlingen district
2025	289	Reutlingen	Reutlingen district

== Members ==
The constituency has been held by Christian Democratic Union (CDU) during all but one Bundestag term since its creation. It was first represented by Oskar Kalbfell of the Social Democratic Party (SPD) from 1949 to 1953. Gustav-Adolf Gedat won it for the CDU in 1953 and served until 1965, followed by Heiner Geißler for one term. Anton Pfeifer was representative from 1969 to 2002, a total of nine consecutive terms. Ernst-Reinhard Beck then served from 2002 to 2013. Michael Donth was elected in 2013, and re-elected in 2017 and 2021.

Election	Member	Party	%
1949	Oskar Kalbfell	SPD	33.3
1953	Gustav-Adolf Gedat	CDU	51.8
1957	Gustav-Adolf Gedat	CDU	47.1
1961	Gustav-Adolf Gedat	CDU	37.3
1965	Heiner Geißler	CDU	46.9
1969	Anton Pfeifer	CDU	47.9
1972	Anton Pfeifer	CDU	50.1
1976	Anton Pfeifer	CDU	52.6
1980	Anton Pfeifer	CDU	51.7
1983	Anton Pfeifer	CDU	58.3
1987	Anton Pfeifer	CDU	51.1
1990	Anton Pfeifer	CDU	42.9
1994	Anton Pfeifer	CDU	47.9
1998	Anton Pfeifer	CDU	42.0
2002	Ernst-Reinhard Beck	CDU	45.2
2005	Ernst-Reinhard Beck	CDU	49.1
2009	Ernst-Reinhard Beck	CDU	42.7
2013	Michael Donth	CDU	51.9
2017	Michael Donth	CDU	40.8
2021	Michael Donth	CDU	32.5
2025	Michael Donth	CDU	38.5

== Election results ==
=== 2025 election ===
Federal election (2025): Reutlingen
Notes:	Blue background denotes the winner of the electorate vote. Pink background denotes a candidate elected from their party list. Yellow background denotes an electorate win by a list member, or other incumbent. A ✓ or ✗ denotes status of any incumbent, win or lose respectively.						
Party	Candidate	Votes	%	±%	Party votes	%	±%
CDU	✓ Michael Donth	63,189	38.5	▲5.9	53,652	32.6	▲6.7
AfD	Rudolf Grams	32,481	19.8	▲9.7	34,595	21.0	▲10.8
SPD	Sebastian Weigle	22,440	13.7	▼4.2	21,626	13.1	▼7.5
Greens	Jaron Always	20,868	12.7	▼3.9	20,122	12.2	▼2.6
Left	Anne Zerr	9,120	5.6	▲1.5	9,970	6.1	▲2.7
FDP	Pascal Kober	9,115	5.6	▼7.8	10,605	6.4	▼10.1
BSW					7,545	4.6	
FW	Roland Rieger	4,645	2.8	▲0.8	2,127	1.3	▼0.3
PARTEI	Thilo Haug	2,054	1.3	▼0.3	766	0.5	▼0.3
Tierschutzpartei					1,310	0.8	▼0.3
Volt					993	0.6	▲0.3
dieBasis				▼1.8	443	0.3	▼1.3
Bündnis C					363	0.2	▼0.1
ÖDP					269	0.2	▼0.1
MLPD	Elke Weidner	290	0.2	▲0.1	73	0.0	0.0
Team Todenhöfer							▼0.5
Pirates							▼0.4
Gesundheitsforschung							▼0.1
Humanists							▼0.1
Informal votes		1,264			812		
Total valid votes		164,202			164,654		
Turnout		165,466	83.6	▲6.4			
CDU hold	Majority	30,708	18.7	▼3.8			

=== 2021 election ===
Federal election (2021): Reutlingen
Notes:	Blue background denotes the winner of the electorate vote. Pink background denotes a candidate elected from their party list. Yellow background denotes an electorate win by a list member, or other incumbent. A ✓ or ✗ denotes status of any incumbent, win or lose respectively.						
Party	Candidate	Votes	%	±%	Party votes	%	±%
CDU	✓ Michael Donth	49,631	32.5	▼8.2	39,504	25.9	▼8.6
SPD	Ulrich Bausch	27,236	17.9	▲2.8	31,535	20.7	▲5.7
Greens	Beate Müller-Gemmeke	25,399	16.7	▲2.3	24,197	15.9	▲2.0
FDP	Pascal Kober	20,411	13.4	▲3.4	25,288	16.6	▲2.8
AfD	Hansjörg Schrade	15,356	10.1	▼1.9	15,652	10.3	▼2.7
Left	Jessica Tatti	6,169	4.0	▼2.2	5,081	3.3	▼2.8
FW	Eberhard Sigloch	3,139	2.1		2,434	1.6	▲1.0
dieBasis	Sofia El Mestary	2,747	1.8		2,442	1.6	
Tierschutzpartei					1,700	1.1	▲0.4
PARTEI	Andreas Schwarz	2,211	1.5	▲0.5	1,239	0.8	▲0.1
Team Todenhöfer					689	0.5	
Pirates					552	0.4	0.0
Volt					451	0.3	
Bündnis C					445	0.3	
ÖDP					329	0.2	▼0.1
Bürgerbewegung					205	0.1	
Gesundheitsforschung					180	0.1	
Humanists					176	0.1	
NPD					151	0.1	▼0.1
DiB					105	0.1	▼0.1
MLPD	Elke Weidner	178	0.1	0.0	79	0.1	0.0
Bündnis 21					71	0.0	
LKR					49	0.0	
DKP					21	0.0	0.0
Informal votes		1,343			1,245		
Total valid votes		152,477			152,575		
Turnout		153,820	77.2	▼1.6			
CDU hold	Majority	22,395	14.6	▼11.0			

=== 2017 election ===
Federal election (2017): Reutlingen
Notes:	Blue background denotes the winner of the electorate vote. Pink background denotes a candidate elected from their party list. Yellow background denotes an electorate win by a list member, or other incumbent. A ✓ or ✗ denotes status of any incumbent, win or lose respectively.						
Party	Candidate	Votes	%	±%	Party votes	%	±%
CDU	✓ Michael Donth	63,494	40.8	▼11.1	53,873	34.5	▼11.7
SPD	Rebecca Hummel	23,397	15.0	▼5.1	23,321	14.9	▼4.3
Greens	Beate Müller-Gemmeke	22,309	14.3	▲1.9	21,695	13.9	▲3.0
AfD	Wolfram Hirt	18,702	12.0	▲7.7	20,171	12.9	▲7.4
FDP	Pascal Kober	15,533	10.0	▲6.1	21,425	13.7	▲6.7
Left	Jessica Tatti	9,711	6.2	▲2.2	9,543	6.1	▲1.3
PARTEI	Lennart Obenauer	1,539	1.0		1,141	0.7	
Tierschutzpartei					1,047	0.7	0.0
Independent	Ralf Matheis	874	0.6				
FW					856	0.5	0.0
Pirates					639	0.4	▼1.8
ÖDP					459	0.3	0.0
NPD					362	0.2	▼0.8
Tierschutzallianz					318	0.2	
BGE					216	0.1	
DiB					209	0.1	
DM					206	0.1	
V-Partei³					190	0.1	
Menschliche Welt					164	0.1	
MLPD	Michael Weidner	244	0.2	0.0	154	0.1	0.0
DIE RECHTE					45	0.0	
DKP					25	0.0	
Informal votes		1,839			1,583		
Total valid votes		155,803			156,059		
Turnout		157,642	78.8	▲3.5			
CDU hold	Majority	40,097	25.8	▼5.9			

=== 2013 election ===
Federal election (2013): Reutlingen
Notes:	Blue background denotes the winner of the electorate vote. Pink background denotes a candidate elected from their party list. Yellow background denotes an electorate win by a list member, or other incumbent. A ✓ or ✗ denotes status of any incumbent, win or lose respectively.						
Party	Candidate	Votes	%	±%	Party votes	%	±%
CDU	Michael Donth	76,870	51.9	▲9.2	68,394	46.2	▲12.4
SPD	Rebecca Hummel	29,859	20.2	▼1.9	28,558	19.3	▲1.3
Greens	Beate Müller-Gemmeke	18,399	12.4	▼1.5	16,195	10.9	▼4.0
AfD	Tim Carstens	6,435	4.3		8,245	5.6	
Left	Günter Herbig	5,966	4.0	▼1.9	7,089	4.8	▼2.2
FDP	Pascal Kober	5,665	3.8	▼9.0	10,441	7.1	▼13.0
Pirates					3,267	2.2	▲0.3
NPD	Axel Heinzmann	1,764	1.2	▼0.6	1,517	1.0	▼0.2
Tierschutzpartei					962	0.6	▲0.1
FW	Erich Marquardt	1,119	0.8		875	0.6	
Independent	Ralf Matheis	964	0.7				
REP					543	0.4	▼0.5
ÖDP	Matthias Dietrich	794	0.5		505	0.3	▲0.1
RENTNER					346	0.2	
Volksabstimmung					324	0.2	▼0.1
PBC					314	0.2	▼0.2
MLPD	Michael Weidner	296	0.2	▼0.1	139	0.1	0.0
Party of Reason					110	0.1	
PRO					104	0.1	
BIG					71	0.0	
BüSo					23	0.0	0.0
Informal votes		1,883			1,992		
Total valid votes		148,131			148,022		
Turnout		150,014	75.3	▲1.9			
CDU hold	Majority	47,011	31.7	▲11.0			

=== 2009 election ===
Federal election (2009): Reutlingen
Notes:	Blue background denotes the winner of the electorate vote. Pink background denotes a candidate elected from their party list. Yellow background denotes an electorate win by a list member, or other incumbent. A ✓ or ✗ denotes status of any incumbent, win or lose respectively.						
Party	Candidate	Votes	%	±%	Party votes	%	±%
CDU	✓ Ernst-Reinhard Beck	60,753	42.7	▼6.5	48,400	33.8	▼4.6
SPD	Sebastian Weigle	31,395	22.0	▼10.4	25,770	18.0	▼11.6
Greens	Beate Müller-Gemmeke	19,871	14.0	▲6.2	21,392	14.9	▲4.3
FDP	Pascal Kober	18,203	12.8	▲7.4	28,740	20.1	▲6.3
Left	Stefan Straub	8,452	5.9	▲2.7	10,060	7.0	▲3.5
Pirates					2,793	1.9	
NPD	Axel Heinzmann	2,491	1.7	▲0.1	1,820	1.3	▲0.2
REP					1,283	0.9	▼0.3
Tierschutzpartei					854	0.6	
PBC					585	0.4	▼0.1
Volksabstimmung					466	0.3	
ÖDP					406	0.3	
DIE VIOLETTEN					264	0.2	
MLPD	Michael Weidner	491	0.3	0.0	190	0.1	0.0
Independent	Ralf Matheis	436	0.3				
Independent	Giuliano Gagliardi	351	0.2				
DVU					96	0.1	
ADM					81	0.1	
BüSo					75	0.1	0.0
Informal votes		3,394			2,562		
Total valid votes		142,443			143,275		
Turnout		145,837	73.5	▼6.4			
CDU hold	Majority	29,358	20.7	▲3.9			

=== 2005 election ===
Federal election (2005):Reutlingen
Notes:	Blue background denotes the winner of the electorate vote. Pink background denotes a candidate elected from their party list. Yellow background denotes an electorate win by a list member, or other incumbent. A ✓ or ✗ denotes status of any incumbent, win or lose respectively.						
Party	Candidate	Votes	%	±%	Party votes	%	±%
CDU	✓ Ernst-Reinhard Beck	75,189	49.1	▲3.9	59,038	38.4	▼5.5
SPD	Sebastian Weigle	49,715	32.5	▼2.3	45,514	29.6	▼3.4
Greens	Thomas Poreski	11,926	7.8	▼1.0	16,374	10.6	▼0.2
FDP	Pascal Kober	8,227	5.4	▼4.8	21,090	13.7	▲5.3
Left	Stefan Straub	5,023	3.3	▲2.2	5,428	3.5	▲2.7
NPD	Axel Heinzmann	2,500	1.6		1,653	1.1	▲0.9
REP					1,862	1.2	▲0.1
Familie					1,020	0.7	
PBC					802	0.5	▲0.1
GRAUEN					652	0.4	▲0.3
MLPD	Ingrid Weible	484	0.3		245	0.2	
BüSo					85	0.1	0.0
Informal votes		3,343			2,644		
Total valid votes		153,064			153,763		
Turnout		156,407	79.9	▼1.9			
CDU hold	Majority	25,474	16.6				
