= HAP Grieshaber =

German artist (1909-1981)

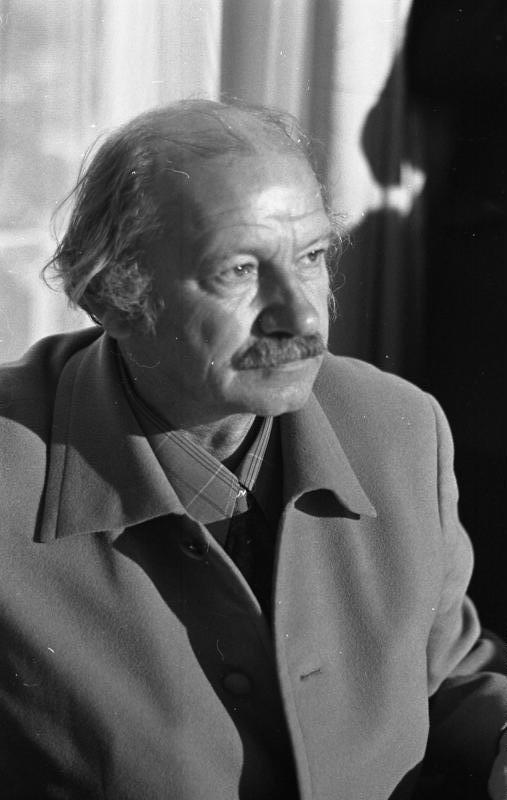
At the signing of the book Grob, fein und göttlich by Grieshaber and his wife Margarete Hannsmann at the Landesvertretung Baden-Württemberg on 8 October 1970

Helmut Andreas Paul Grieshaber or HAP Grieshaber (15 February 1909 – 12 May 1981) was a German artist. His preferred medium were large-format woodcuts.

== Biography ==
Grieshaber was born in Rot an der Rot. He went to school in Nagold and later in Reutlingen. From the age of 17 he was apprenticed to the printing trade in Reutlingen. While here, from 1926 to 1928, he studied art in nearby Stuttgart. He then travelled extensively to Paris, London, Egypt, Arabia and Greece. At the beginning of the Nazi regime, from 1933 until 1940, Grieshaber was banned from his profession. During that time he scratched out a living as an untrained labourer in the town of Reutlingen. He spent the war years unwillingly in the German army and, as a prisoner of war, doing forced labour in Belgian mines. After the war he returned to Germany, living in a small cottage on the Achalm, and concentrated on doing large-scale woodcuts and posters. From 1951 to 1953 he taught at the Bernsteinschule school of art. Between 1955 and 1960 he taught at the Kunstakademie (Academy of Fine Arts) in Karlsruhe as successor to Erich Heckel.

Grieshaber was a long-time pacifist and political activist, not only against the dictatorships in Greece and Chile, but also in the area of conservation and ecology, against nuclear plants, and in favour of a bridging between the two Germanies. His companion in his later years, from 1967 till his death in 1981, was the lyric poet Margarete Hannsmann.

Grieshaber was honoured with numerous prizes and retrospective exhibitions. He exhibited works at the documenta in 1959 and 1964. In honor of his 70th birthday in 1979, large retrospectives were shown in various museums in both parts of Germany. The last prize that Grieshaber was awarded in 1980 was the art prize of the town of Konstanz. Grieshaber died in 1981 in Eningen unter Achalm aged 72 years.

== Relations ==
Grieshaber's daughter, Nani Croze, founded a stained glass workshop on the Athi-Kapiti plains adjacent to the Nairobi National Park. She was primarily a muralist, experimenting in a range of materials. Her commissioned works can be found all over East Africa. HAP's grandson, Anselm Croze (who apprenticed with him in 1975 as a nine year old), owns and runs a renowned glass blowing and dalle de verre studio - Kitengela Glass, which he founded in 1992.

== Works ==
Grieshaber's work were influenced by works of Paul Klee and Lyonel Feininger. He took a stab at industrial design in the 1970s with a 500-piece run of the upscale Suomi tableware by Timo Sarpaneva that Grieshaber decorated for the German Rosenthal porcelain maker's Studio Linie.

== See also ==
- List of German painters
