= Michael Donth =

German politician (born 1967)

Michael Donth MdB
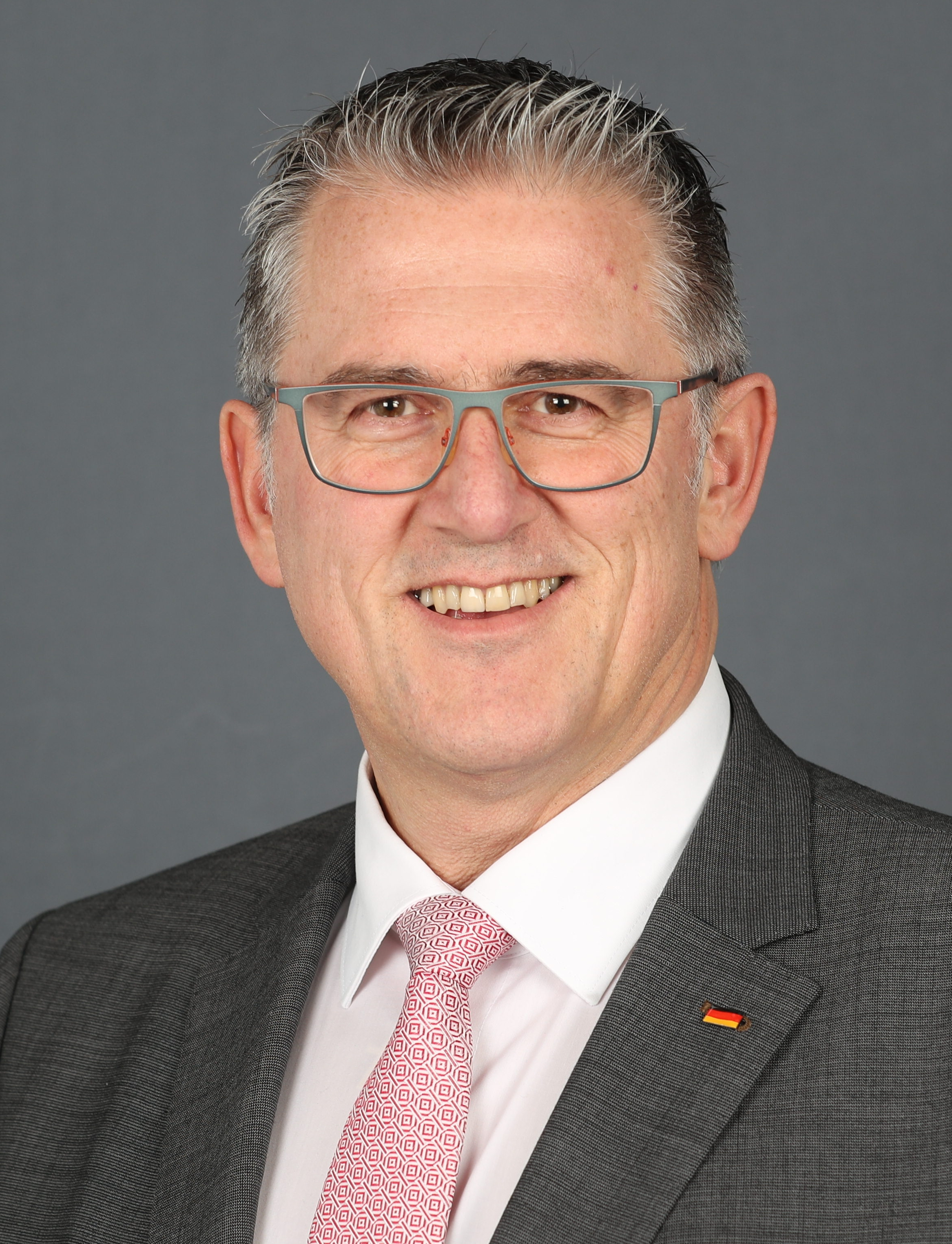
- Donth in 2020

Member of the Bundestag; for Reutlingen
- Incumbent
- Assumed office 22 October 2013
- Preceded by: Ernst-Reinhard Beck

Personal details
- Born: 8 June 1967 (age 59) Metzingen, West Germany
- Party: Christian Democratic Union
- Children: 3

Michael Donth (born 8 June 1967) is a German politician of the Christian Democratic Union (CDU) who has been serving as a member of the Bundestag from the state of Baden-Württemberg, Germany, since 2013.

== Early life and career ==
From 1977 to 1986, he attended the Dietrich Bonhoeffer Gymnasium in Metzingen, where he completed his Abitur. He then underwent training in the higher non-technical administrative service from 1987 to 1991, while also attending the University of Applied Sciences for Public Administration in Ludwigsburg from 1989 to 1991, graduating with a degree in Public Administration (FH). Additionally, he completed his basic military service from 1986 to 1987.

His professional career began in 1991 in the finance administration of the city of Metzingen, where he worked until 1994. He then moved to the main office of the city of Pfullingen, where he was employed from 1994 to 1999. From 1999 to 2013, he served as the mayor of the municipality of Römerstein, where he was responsible for municipal administration and the development of the community.

== Political career ==
Donth became a member of the Bundestag in the 2013 German federal election, representing the Reutlingen district. He is a member of the Committee on Transport and Digital Infrastructure and the Committee on Tourism.

In addition to his committee assignments, Donth is part of the German-French Parliamentary Friendship Group; the German Parliamentary Friendship Group for Relations with the States of Central America; and the German Parliamentary Friendship Group for Relations with the States of South Asia. Since 2022, he has been chairing a cross-party group in support of UNESCO-recognized nature reserves.

In the negotiations to form a coalition government under the leadership of Minister-President of Baden-Württemberg Winfried Kretschmann following the 2021 state elections, Donth was a member of the working group on mobility, co-chaired by Winfried Hermann and Thomas Dörflinger.

== Other activities ==
- Federal Network Agency for Electricity, Gas, Telecommunications, Posts and Railway (BNetzA), Member of the Rail Infrastructure Advisory Council

== Political positions ==
In June 2017, Donth voted against Germany's introduction of same-sex marriage.

Ahead of the 2021 national elections, Donth endorsed Markus Söder as the Christian Democrats' joint candidate to succeed Chancellor Angela Merkel.
