= Breitenbach (Echaz) =

River in Germany

- The Breitenbach in Heckwiesen

Location
- Country: Germany
- State: Baden-Württemberg

Physical characteristics
- Mouth
  - location: Echaz
  - coordinates: 48.5011°N 9.1699°E
- Length: 8.9 km (5.5 mi)

Basin features
- Progression: Echaz→ Neckar→ Rhine→ North Sea

The Breitenbach (German pronunciation: [ˈbʁaɪtn̩bax]) in Landkreis Reutlingen, Baden-Württemberg, Germany, is a southern and orographic left tributary of the Echaz. It is about 8.9 kilometres (5.5 mi) long. It is a southern and left tributary of the Echaz, which is located in Reutlingen.

== Geography ==
=== Sources ===
The Breitenbach has its source at Albtrauf, the northwestern steep drop of the Swabian Alb. Its main source, named Breitenbachquelle, is located about 2 km (1.2 mi) northeast of Gönningen (a part of Reutlingen) and 750 metres (2,460 ft) south of Kreisstraße 6729 and 736.5 m south of Barm on the northern flank of the Pfullinger Berg, a northern spur of the Barm 736.5, in a clearing to just over 500 metres (1,600 ft) elevation. The spring, situated under a severe slope, is enclosed in a niche of about 5 m^{2} (54 sq ft) with natural stone and is designated as a natural monument. The water rises here at the higher layer boundary of the lower White Jurassic marl to the well-layered limestone formation 20 m (66 ft) below the spring, lime sinter cushions grow from the spring water through lime precipitation. A little further south and thus above the main spring there is another spring at a little above 600 m (2,000 ft) elevation.

=== Course ===
At the beginning, the Breitenbach, which mainly flows northwards, flows through the Selchen valley and remains in the forest until it crosses the Landesstraße 383 above Reutlingen after about half of its course. Then the brook, now lined by trees and bushes, runs through agricultural land at a westerly distance from the centre of Reutlingen. After that it crosses under the Bundesstraße 28 and the railway line Plochingen-Tübingen in Reutlingen.

=== Estuary ===
The Breitenbach estuary, on its last meters flowing to the northwest, in the southern part of the Reutlingen district Betzingen at the cemetery In der Au into the Neckar inflow Echaz coming from the east-southeast.

=== Tributaries and still waters ===
The tributaries of the Breitebach and the still waters at and near the stream belong - ordered from the source to the estuary (waters of higher order correspondingly indented under their receiving water; lengths and areas of waters according to the geodata viewer; elevation in meters (m) above sea level, mostly interpolated according to the contour lines there):

- Ehrensbach, from right to below 510 metres (1,670 ft) elevation shortly before the road from Pfullingen to Gönningen, 0.8 km (0.50 mi); originates at below 560 m on the northern slope of the Gielsberg
- Tributary, from the left in Wolfsloch to above 450 m (1,480 ft), 1.7 km; originates at about 580 m at the northern foot of the Stöffelberg with the Stöffel Castle ruin
- Breitwiesenbach, from right to below 440 m (1,440 ft) elevation, 1.2 km; originates at over 500 m on the Pfingstweide in the forest west of the Pfullinger Georgenhof
- feeds a lake in a valley clearing, 0.3 ha (0.74 acres).
- Stadtwiesenbach, from left to above 410 m, 1.2 km; originates at over 500 m at the landfill at Käpfle
- (Tributary from the Eichwald), from left to below 400 m (1,300 ft) elevation at the exit into a southern corridor bay, 1,1 km; originates at about 460 m in the "Eichwald
- Schinderbachgraben, from the right a few steps further, 1.5 km; originates at about 510 m in the forest a little north of the "Pfingstweide" and passes the "Teufelsklinge".
- feeds a pond in the middle of the bay, 2,2 ha
- Eichwäldlesgraben, from the left to about 385 m shortly before the L 383, 1.7 km Drains the landfill at the Hofgut Alteburg
- Schinderreingraben, from the right just after the road, 1.0 km; originates at about 430 m in the woods Hohlichtenrain
- Schlattwiesenbach, from the right at about 380 m elevation at the northern tip of the motor sports area, 2.2 km; originates at below 545 m in the Rötwald
  - feeds up by 39 m of some ponds in the middle of the southern edge of the sports area around the stadium Kreuzeich, the largest 0.8 ha and 0.3 ha
- Scheuerlesbach, from the left to 363 m, 3.5 km; originates at below 525 m west of the Alteburg court estate at the edge of the forest
  - (Shorter source branch), from left to below 430 m elevation still before the exit of the forest, 0.9 km; originates at about 470 m in the forest at the Cross holm oak
  - (Tributary), from the right to about 380 m in Listhof Nature Reserve, 0.7 km
- Pond in the cemetery next to the estuary, 0.1 ha

== See also ==
- List of rivers of Baden-Württemberg
