= Reißenbach =

River in Germany

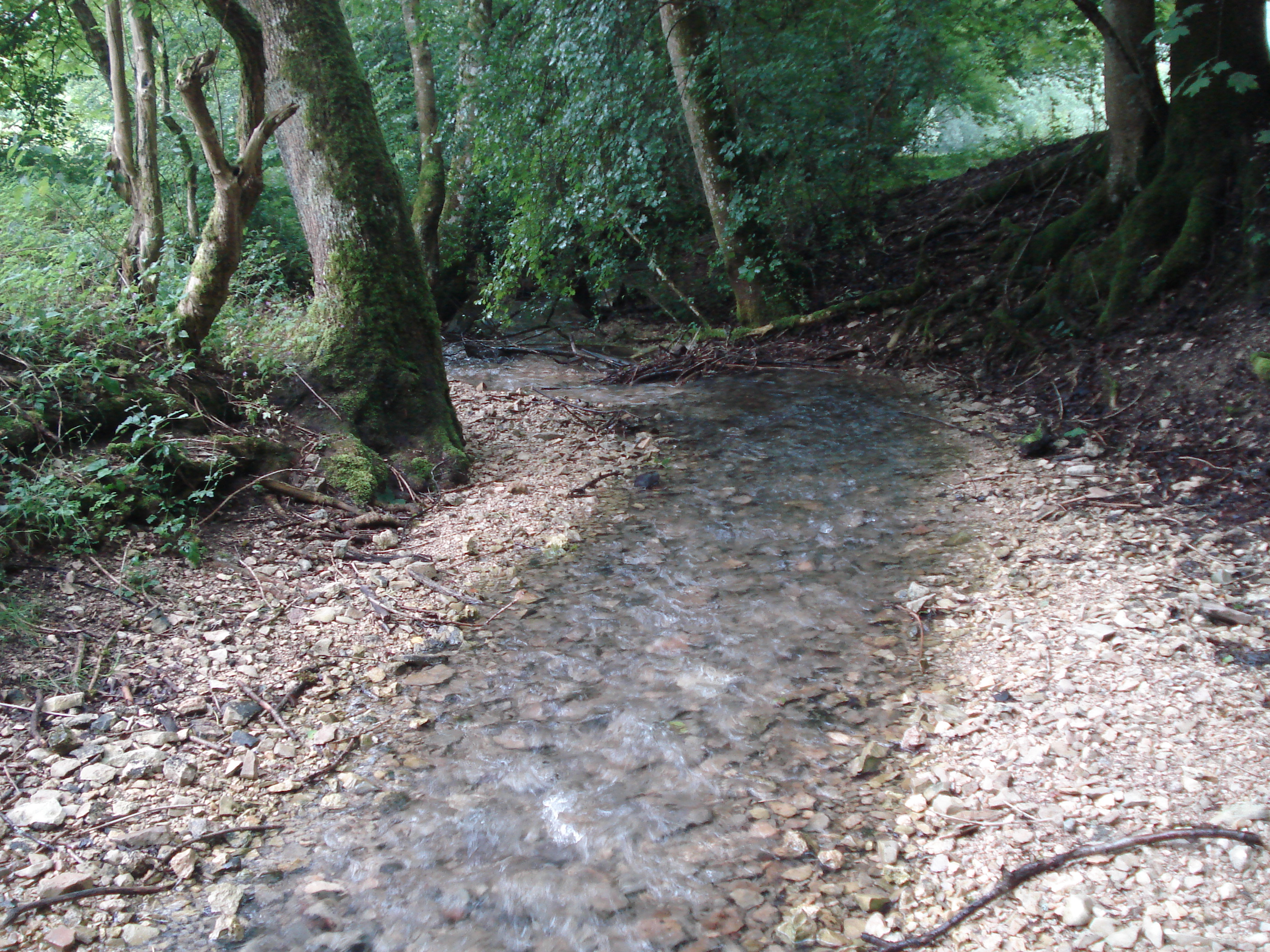

Location
- Country: Germany
- States: Baden-Württemberg

Physical characteristics
- Mouth
  - location: Echaz
  - coordinates: 48°25′38″N 9°15′21″E

Basin features
- Progression: Echaz→ Neckar→ Rhine→ North Sea

Reißenbach is a small river of Baden-Württemberg, Germany. It flows into the Echaz in Lichtenstein.

== See also ==
- List of rivers of Baden-Württemberg
