= Echaz =

River in Germany

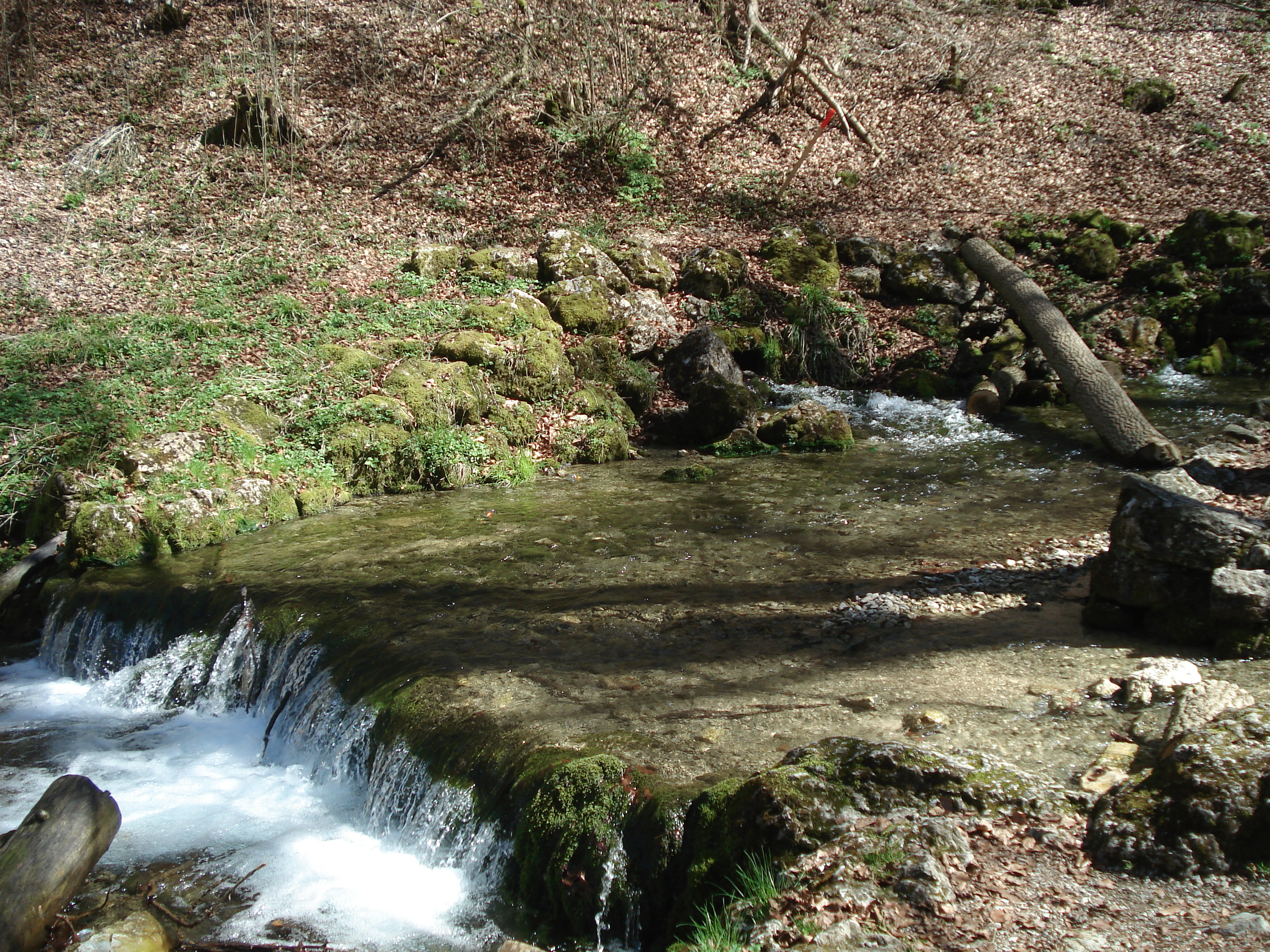
- Source of the Echaz

Location
- Country: Germany
- State: Baden-Württemberg

Physical characteristics
- Mouth
  - location: Neckar
  - coordinates: 48.5334°N 9.1388°E
- Length: 23.8 km (14.8 mi)

Basin features
- Progression: Neckar→ Rhine→ North Sea

The Echaz (German pronunciation: [ˈɛçats]) is a 23 km long river in Baden-Württemberg, Germany, a tributary of the Neckar.

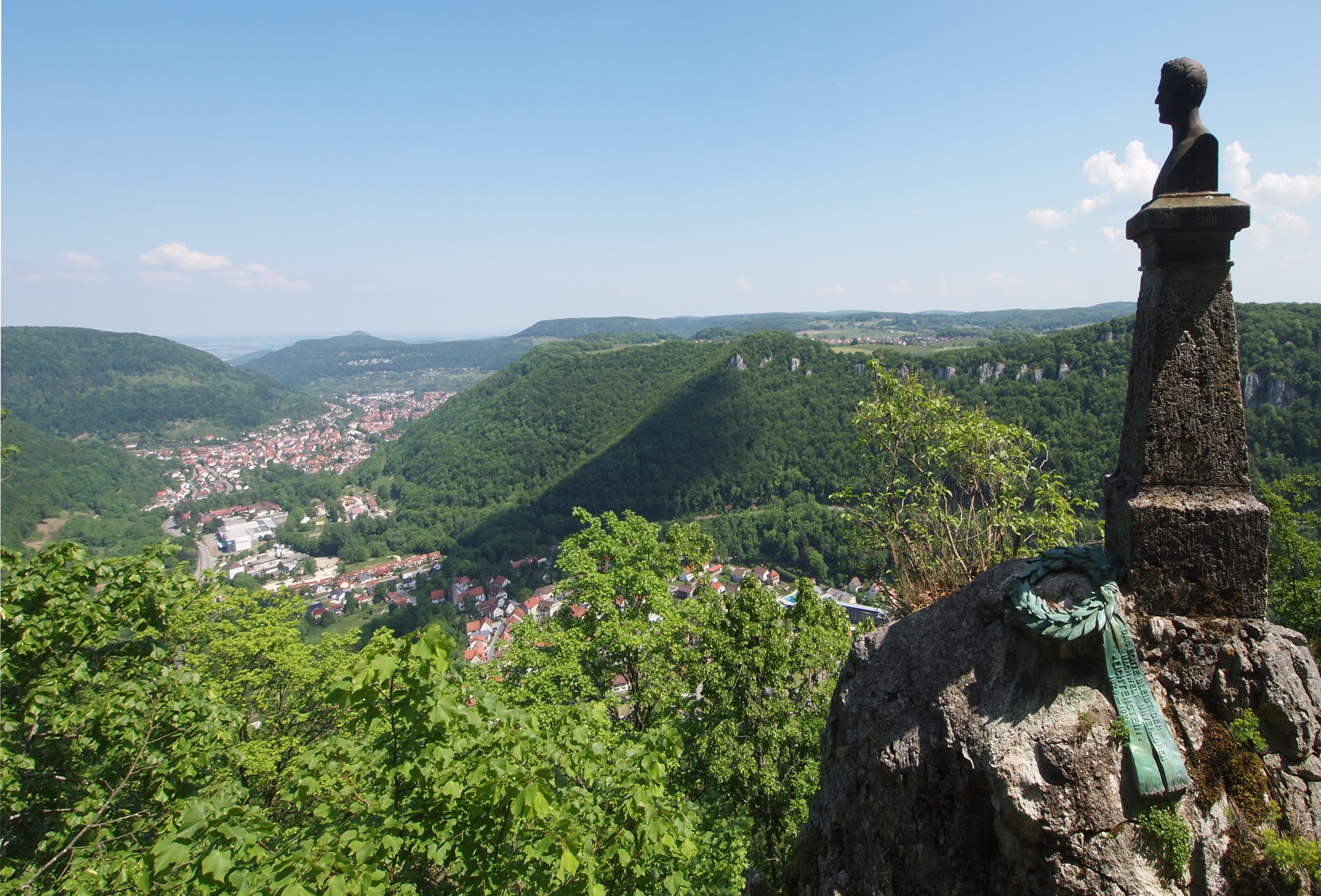
Echaz valley

It has its source on the Swabian Jura, near Lichtenstein, south of Reutlingen. After flowing through Pfullingen, Reutlingen and Wannweil, it discharges into the Neckar near Kirchentellinsfurt, which lies halfway between Reutlingen and Tübingen.

== Geography ==
=== Echaz springs ===
The origin of the Echaz is situated close to the Albtrauf south of the district Honau of the municipality Lichtenstein. The Echazquellen are situated below Lichtenstein Castle at an altitude of 557 metres above sea level at the south-eastern tip of the wedging open corridor of a valley, which continues as a wooded and steep ravine upwards for almost a kilometre and mostly dry up to the Ohafelsen.

These springs pour from 60 L/s to 2.000 L/s, on average about 680 L/s. At several places water is leaking out, which collects in the stream bed. However, a large part of the spring water is captured before it is discharged and after treatment is fed into the drinking water supply of the region, which also uses other water, for example from Lake Constance.

The lower Echaz springs have the heaviest rainfall. In the karst aquifer they have an underground catchment area of about 90 km², which therefore continues beyond the very close surface European watershed at the Albtrauf far to the south below the plateau of the Swabian Alb.

The Echazquelle is protected under the protected area number 841-50920044 as an extensive natural monument.

=== Course ===
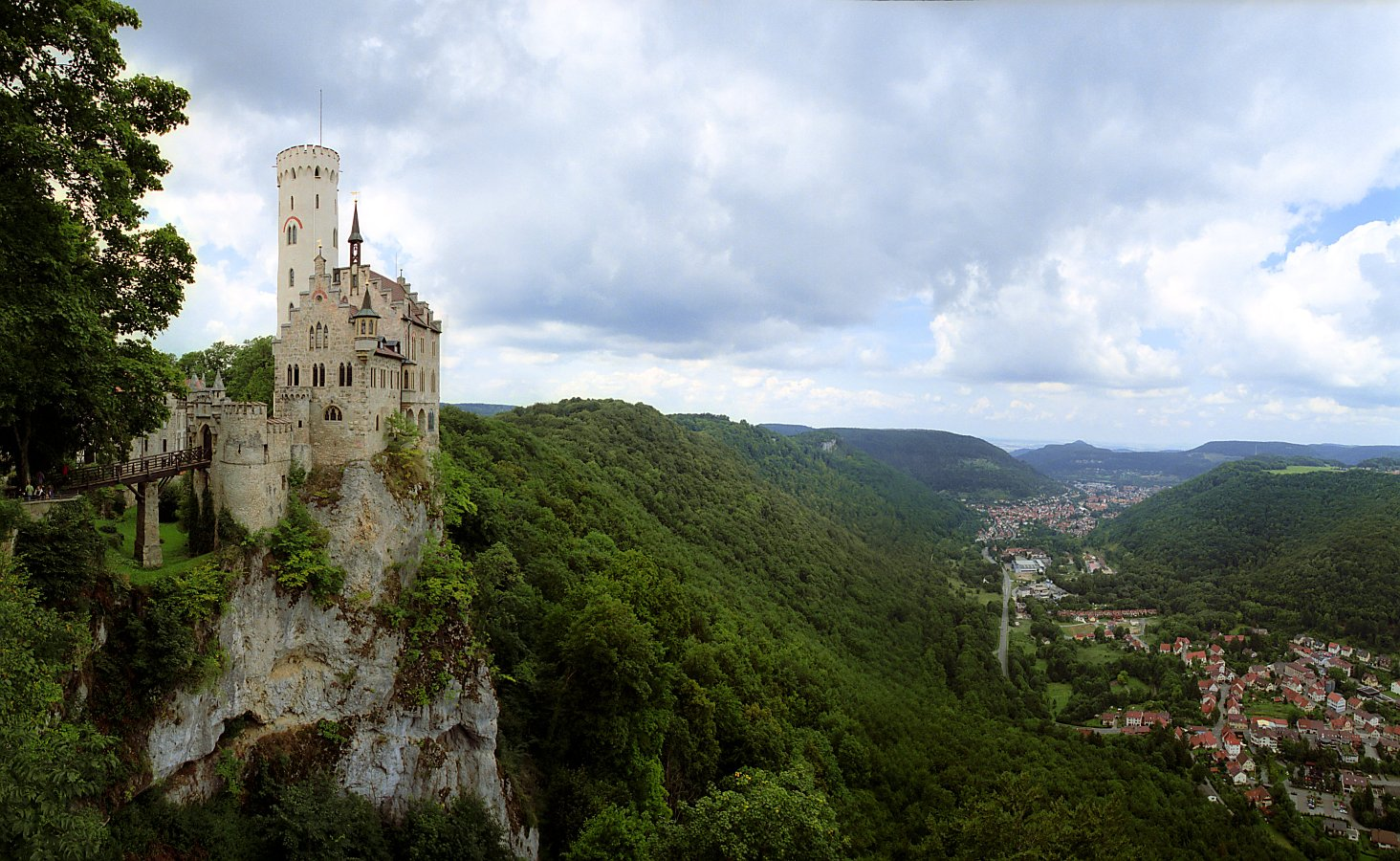
Look from Albrand in north direction over the upper Echaztal valley and the community of Lichtenstein with the districts Honau - in the picture right down - and Unterhausen in the background, left the castle Lichtenstein (August 2008)

The Echaz continues to flow through Lichtenstein, the district Unterhausen and the towns Pfullingen and Reutlingen. Below Wannweil the river leaves the Reutlingen district and then flows into the Neckar at Kirchentellinsfurt from the right at 305.5 metres above sea level. So the river has a mean bed gradient of about 12 ‰ on the 22.8 km from the Echazquellen to the mouth of the river.

=== Tributaries ===
List of tributaries from the source to the estuary. Lengths of water bodies usually according to LUBW-FG10 (data record entries), catchment areas correspondingly according to LUBW-GEZG, lake areas according to LUBW-SG10, elevations according to the contour line image on the geodata viewer. Other sources for the data are noted.

Highest possible source of the Echaz at the Ohafelsen south-underneath Lichtenstein Castle at about 690 metres above sea level

- Langwiesenbach, from left in the southern Lichtenstein, 1.2 km and 1.9 km².
- Reißenbach from left in Lichtenstein, 2.3 km and 5.0 km².
- Stahlecker Bach from the Zellertal, from right at the northern edge of Lichtenstein-Unterhausen, 3,1 km and 8,9 km².
- Heergassenbach, from the right in Pfullingen into the Echazkanal there, 1.3 km.
- Eierbach, from left at the southern edge of Pfullingen, 5.0 km and 12.3 km².
- Arbach, from right between Pfullingen and Reutlingen, 6.7 km and 22.1 km².
- Kaibach, from left in Reutlingen-Betzingen, 4,3 km and 5,4 km².
- Leyrenbach, from the right in Betzingen, 1,2 km.
- Breitenbach (Echaz), from left in Betzingen, 8.9 km and 16.8 km².
- Ersbergbach, from the right at the Betzinger sewage plant, 0.8 km.
- Fallenbach, from right before Wannweil, 0.7 km.
- Firstbach, from left in Wannweil, 7.1 km and 6.8 km².
- Klingwiesenbach, from right in Wannweil, 1.5 km and 1.0 km².
- Heckbach, from left in Wannweil, 4.9 km and 13.2 km².
- Schützenhausgraben, from the right in the north Wannweil, 0.7 km.
- Waldrandbächle, from the right in the north Wannweil, 0.3 km.
- Grenzgraben, from the right at the community border to Kirchentellinsfurt, 1.0 km.

Estuary of the Echaz at the western edge of Kirchentellinsfurt. The water body is 23.8 km long from the Ohafelsen and has a catchment area of 135.6 km².

== Flood 2013 ==
After prolonged rainfall at the end of May and beginning of June, the villages of the upper Echaz valley between Lichtenstein and Reutlingen were also affected by the Flood in Central Europe 2013.

== Use ==
The power of the Echazwasser is still used today to generate electricity, partly with historical plants like the Baumannsche Mühle in Pfullingen with electricity for up to 40 households, partly even with modern, newly built plants like at the Reutlingen ZOB. (electricity for 30 households). In Pfullingen up to 34 water drives were in use in the 19th century, in Reutlingen 27.

Very early on the Echaz fish farming was practised. For example, the first mention of Honau in a document in connection with fishing rights. Even today, Honau is widely known for its restaurants with trout specialities.

== See also ==
- List of rivers of Baden-Württemberg
