= Georgenberg =

Georgenberg (German for "George['s] Mountain") is the name of several mountains and may also refer to:

Places

- Georgenberg, Neustadt, municipality in Bavaria, Germany
- Georgenberg (Reutlingen), mountain in Baden-Württemberg, Germany
- Miasteczko Śląskie, town in Upper Silesia, Poland (German: Georgenberg O.S., Georgenberg (Oberschlesien))

Abbeys

- St. Georgenberg-Fiecht Abbey

== See also ==
- Georgenburg (disambiguation) (German for "George['s] Castle")
