= Pascal Kober =

German politician

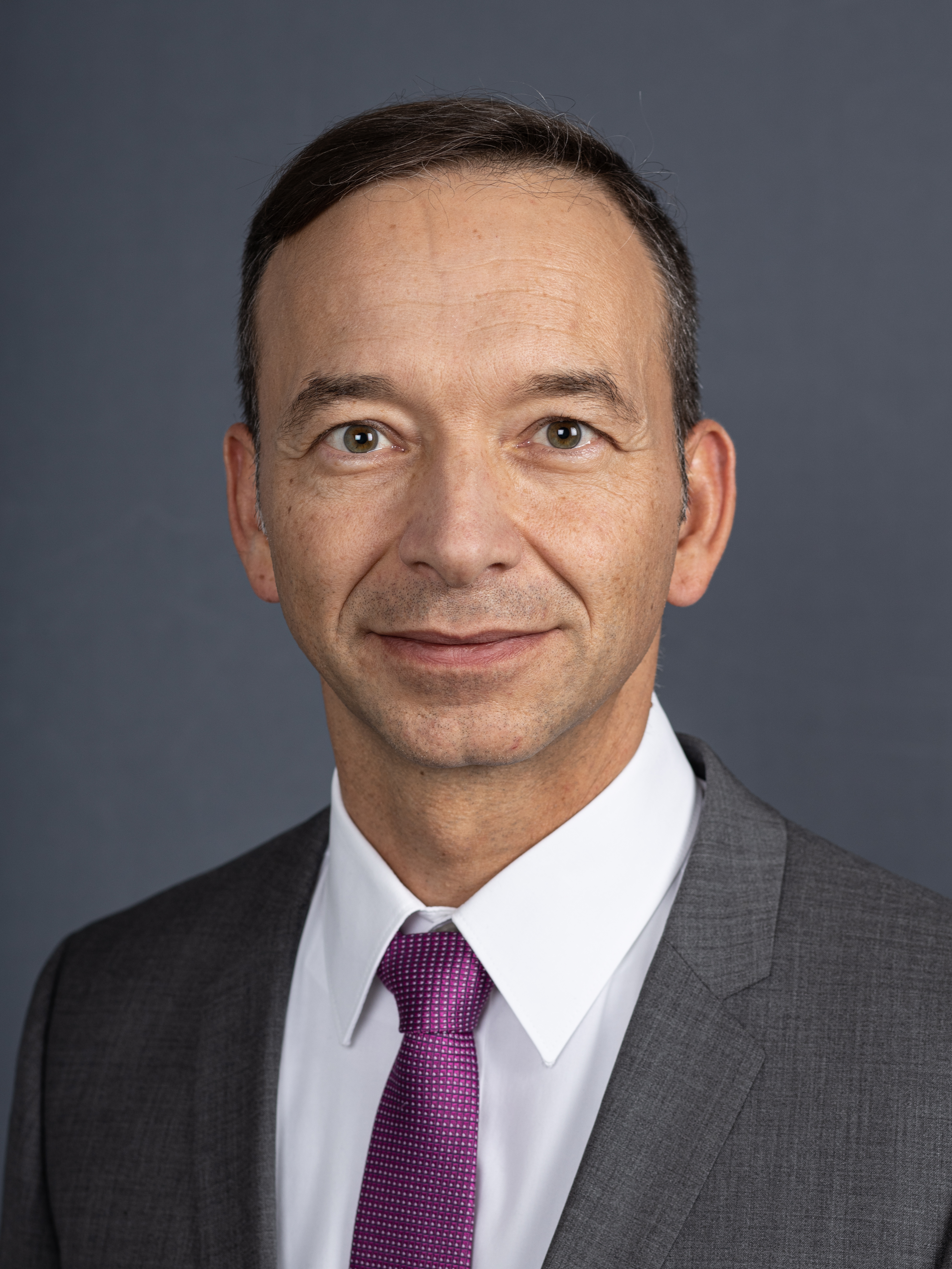
- Kober in 2020

Member of the Bundestag
- In office 2017–2025

Personal details
- Born: 3 July 1971 (age 55) Sindelfingen, West Germany (now Germany)
- Party: FDP
- Education: Augustana Divinity School

Pascal Kober (born 3 July 1971) is a German military chaplain and politician of the Free Democratic Party (FDP) who has served as a member of the Bundestag from the state of Baden-Württemberg from 2009 to 2013 and again from 2017 to 2025.

In addition to his parliamentary work, Kober has been serving as the Commissioner for the Victims of Domestic Terrorist Activities at the Federal Ministry of Justice in the government of Chancellor Olaf Scholz since 2022.

== Early life and education ==
Born in Sindelfingen, Baden-Württemberg, Kober grew up in Böblingen and studied Protestant theology at the universities of Tübingen, Kiel, and Neuendettelsau.

== Career ==
Kober is pastor of the Evangelical-Lutheran Church in Württemberg and was a member of the Bundestag from 2009 to 2013, representing the Reutlingen district. During that time, he served on the Committee on Labour and Social Affairs and the Committee on Human Rights and Humanitarian Aid. In addition to his committee assignments, he was part of the German-American Parliamentary Friendship Group and the German-Israeli Parliamentary Friendship Group.

Kober retired from politics with the federal elections in 2013 and worked as a military chaplain at the Bundeswehr's Stetten am kalten Markt and Pfullendorf sites from March 2014. In 2015 and 2016 he went on two foreign missions to Mali, as part of the European Union Training Mission in Mali (EUTM Mali) in Bamako and the United Nations Multidimensional Integrated Stabilization Mission in Mali (MINUSMA) in Gao.

Kober was elected deputy state chairman of the FDP in Baden-Württemberg on 5 January 2015 in Stuttgart, serving under the leadership of chairman Michael Theurer.

Kober became a member of the Bundestag again in the 2017 German federal election. From January 2018, he was a member of the Committee for Labour and Social Affairs. He is also his parliamentary group's spokesperson on social policy. In November 2018, Kober initiated a cross-party interest group on horses.

In the negotiations to form a so-called traffic light coalition of the Social Democratic Party (SPD), the Green Party and the FDP following the 2021 German elections, Kober was part of his party's delegation in the working group on social policy, co-chaired by Dagmar Schmidt, Sven Lehmann and Johannes Vogel.

== Other activities ==
- Federal Academy for Security Policy (BAKS), Member of the Advisory Board (since 2022)
- Reservist Association of Deutsche Bundeswehr, Vice-President (since 2019)
