= Achalm Castle =

Castle in Baden-Württemberg, Germany

Achalm Castle
- Ruine Achalm
- Germany
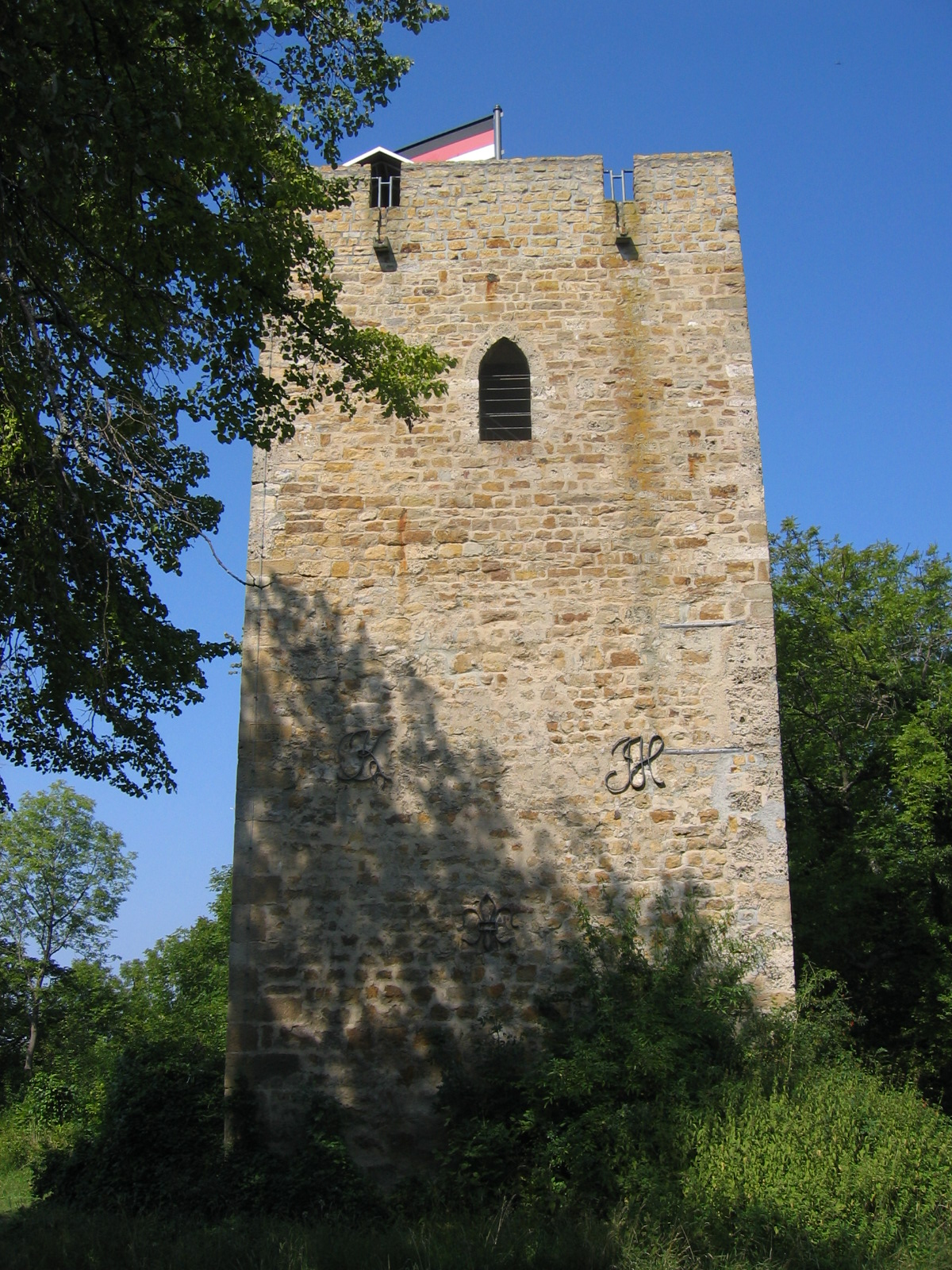

Site information
- Type: Castle

Location
- Location in Baden-Württemberg, Germany Achalm Castle (Germany)
- Coordinates: 48°29′39″N 9°14′38″E

Achalm Castle is a ruined castle located above the towns of Reutlingen and Pfullingen in Baden-Württemberg, Germany. Situated on the top of a hill at the edge of the Swabian Alb the ruins of the 11th-century castle are topped by a look-out tower from 1838.

== History ==
Achalm Castle was built around 1030 by Gaugraf Egino and Rudolf of Achalm. The name Achalm appears to refer to a nearby stream, the Ach which comes from the River Alm. According to legend, the name of the castle comes from another source. As the castle was under construction two workers began to fight. Egino separated the two and locked one of them in the castle dungeon. The prisoner soon escaped and when he saw Egino, stabbed him. As he lay dying, his last words were Ach Alm meaning to say Ach Allmächtiger (English: Oh! Almighty (God)). His brother, thinking he was honoring his last words named the castle Achalm.

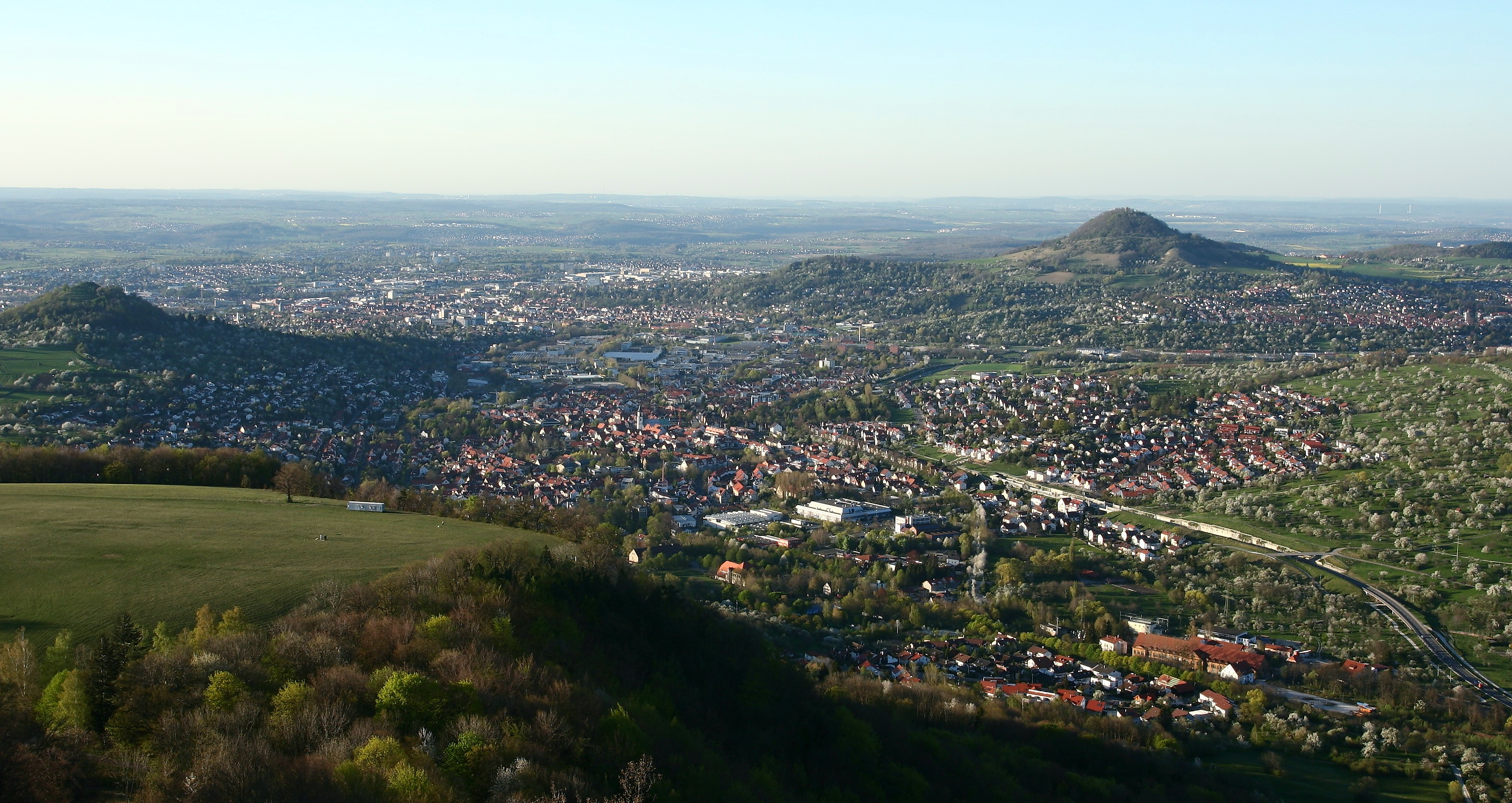
The Achalm is the most-right hill, in front Pfullingen (View from the Schönbergturm)

The castle was expanded in the 11th Century with a second tower. However the von Achalm family died out shortly thereafter. The castle passed through several owners including the House of Welf. In 1234 the son of the Holy Roman Emperor Frederick II, King Henry VII, rebelled against his father, the Emperor. The owner of Castle Achalm, Heinrich of Neuffen, sided with the rebellious King Henry VII. Following the Emperor's victory over his son Henry VII, Castle Achalm became the personal property of the Emperor's family, the House of Hohenstaufen. Castle Achalm remained a Hohenstaufen property for a time. The castle then passed into the control of the House of Württemberg. In 1377 Graf or Count Ulrich of Württemberg marched from the castle to attack the town of Reutlingen. While he besieged the city, troops from the Swabian Cities League marched to defend the city. Ulrich's troops were defeated and Reutlingen remained a Free Imperial City.

Over the following centuries, the castle began to lose its military value and began to collapse. During the later years of the Thirty Years' War, in 1650, the castle was partially destroyed to prevent enemy forces from using the castle for shelter. Later the stones were removed to build houses in the village. In 1822 the future king and emperor William I had a stone look-out tower built on the foundation of the old tower. The tower was repaired and renovated in 1932 to prevent it from collapsing.

== See also ==
- List of castles in Baden-Württemberg

== Sources ==
- Eberhard Fritz (2006), Das Hofgut Achalm im Besitz des Hauses Württemberg: Reutlinger Geschichtsblätter, Volume 45, Pages 139–172
