= Anne Zerr (German politician) =

German politician (born 1993)

Member of the Bundestag for Baden-Württemberg
- Incumbent
- Assumed office 2025

Personal details
- Born: 21 July 1993 (age 32) Stuttgart, Germany
- Party: Die Linke

Anne Theresa Zerr (born 21 July 1993) is a German politician from Die Linke.

In the 2025 German federal election, Zerr ran as a direct candidate in Reutlingen and entered the Bundestag via fifth place on her party's Baden-Württemberg state list. Before her election to the 21st German Bundestag, Zerr worked for the United Services Union (ver.di) Fils-Neckar-Alb as union secretary for transport, education, social work, and local government.

Following her entry into the Bundestag, Zerr, who lives in Tübingen, announced that she would open a constituency office in Tübingen in addition to Reutlingen. Constituency 290, Tübingen, remained without a member of the Bundestag due to the 2023 changes to the seat allocation regulations.
