= Georgenburg =

Georgenburg (German for "George['s] Castle") may refer to:

- Georgenburg, German name of Jurbarkas, a city in Lithuania
- Georgenburg, German name of Mayovka, a rural locality in Kaliningrad Oblast, Russia

See also

- Georgenberg (German for "George['s] Mountain")
