= Eningen =

Eningen unter Achalm
- Municipality
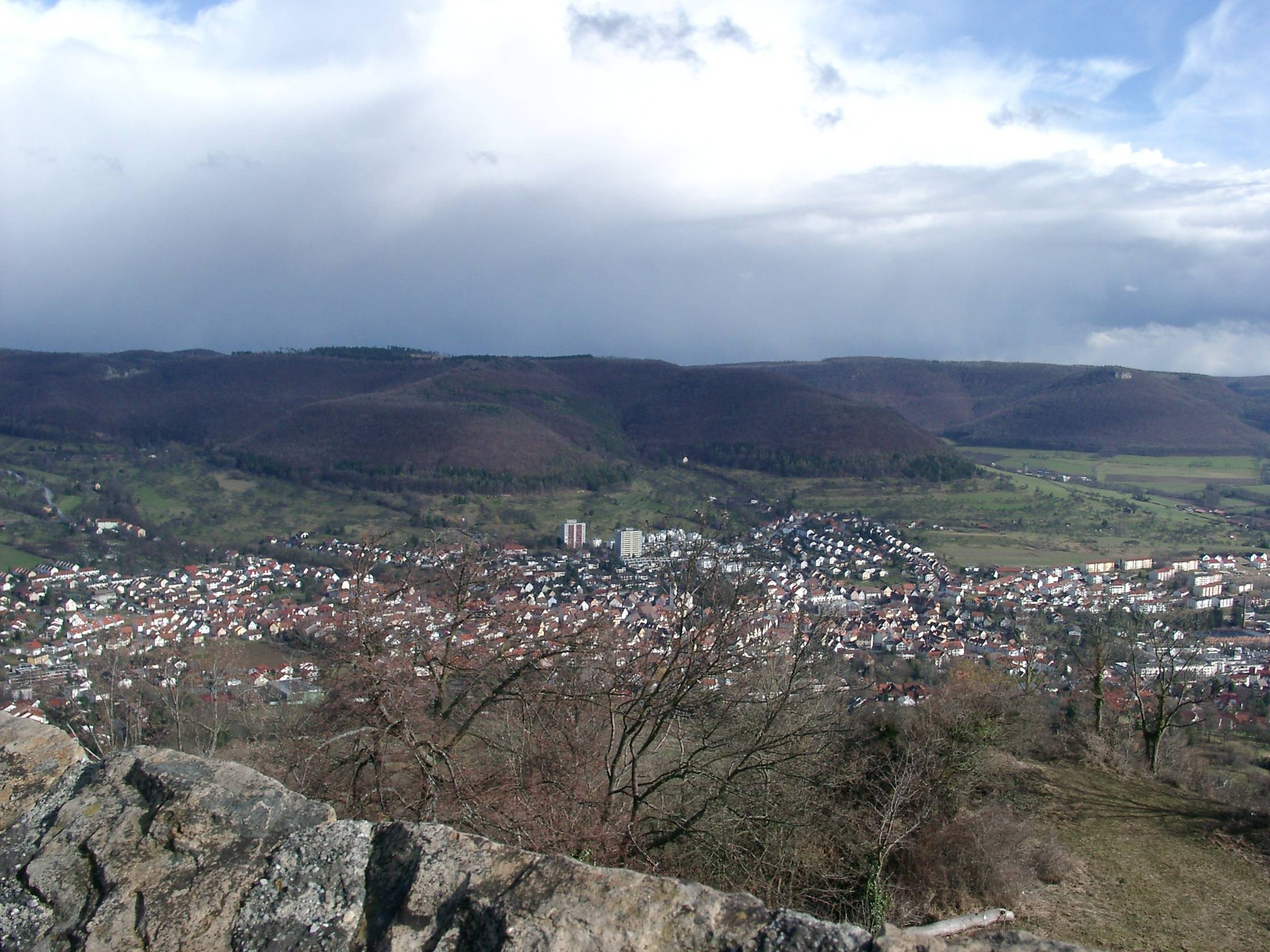
- General view of Eningen

- Coat of arms

- Location of Eningen unter Achalm within Reutlingen district
- Interactive map of Eningen unter Achalm
- Location within Germany Location within Baden-Württemberg
- Coordinates: 48°28′59″N 09°15′08″E
- Country: Germany
- State: Baden-Württemberg
- Admin. region: Tübingen
- District: Reutlingen

Government
  - Mayor (2023–31): Eric Sindek

Area
  - Total: 23.13 km^{2} (8.93 sq mi)
- Elevation: 489 m (1,604 ft)

Population (2025-12-31)
  - Total: 11,145
  - Density: 481.8/km^{2} (1,248/sq mi)
- Time zone: UTC+01:00 (CET)
  - Summer (DST): UTC+02:00 (CEST)
- Postal codes: 72800
- Dialling codes: 07121
- Vehicle registration: RT
- Website: www.eningen.de

Eningen (full name Eningen unter Achalm [ˈeːnɪŋən ʔʊntɐ ˈʔaxalm], lit. 'Eningen under Achalm'; Swabian: Ẽnenga ondr dr Achl) is a municipality in the district of Reutlingen, Baden-Württemberg, Germany. It is situated at the foot of the Swabian Alps and near the big cities of Reutlingen and Stuttgart. Although it has a considerable population, its structure is more that of a village. The most important annual events include the Dorffest (the village festival) and the Weihnachtsmarkt (the Christmas market). Eningen is surrounded by free-standing hills of the Achalm and the Swabian Alps with a landscape full of dark green forests and cliffs. This makes volksmarching, hiking and biking popular.

== History ==
Eningen is considered to have been founded in 1090, through the contract of Bempflingen. At that time, Eningen was a small village and its destiny was connected with the interests of the church and nobility. Although the village had grown steadily, until the Thirty Years' War, to a stately municipality inhabited by at least 1,300 inhabitants, Eningen was almost completely destroyed as a result of the war. After the war, the municipality started to recover slowly. Over the years, Eningen developed into a major community. In 1843, Eningen had more than 5000 inhabitants and was considered to be "most beautiful and most populous village in the Kingdom of Württemberg". After the Second World War, Eningen was considered a village and belonged to the city of Reutlingen but it would recover its traditional independence. New roads, and industries were established. Its water supply came from Lake Constance. In 1970, Eningen was awarded with a “recreation and health locality recognition”. Today, Eningen has an area of approximately 2316 ha; 848 ha of those are forest or green area. Administratively, Eningen is a municipality of the county of Reutlingen which is assigned to the district of Tübingen in Baden Württemberg.

== Infrastructure ==
Eningen has its own town hall, post and police offices. It a wide service infrastructure: two pharmacies, two banks, one public library, one festival hall, one public outdoor swimming pool and five park. Eningen has nine kindergartens, two primary schools, one music school and an adult education center. Eningen also has two bus connections to Reutlingen, as well as a bus connection to several villages of the Swabian Mountains and one connection to Metzingen. Eningen has three sports halls, one sports field, one tennis complex, one horseback riding field and a one mini golf course.

It is home to many companies including Viavi Solutions.

The artist Gudrun Krüger lived in Eningen for most of her working life.

Eningen is twinned with the town of Calne in Wiltshire, England.
