= Anton Pfeifer =

German politician

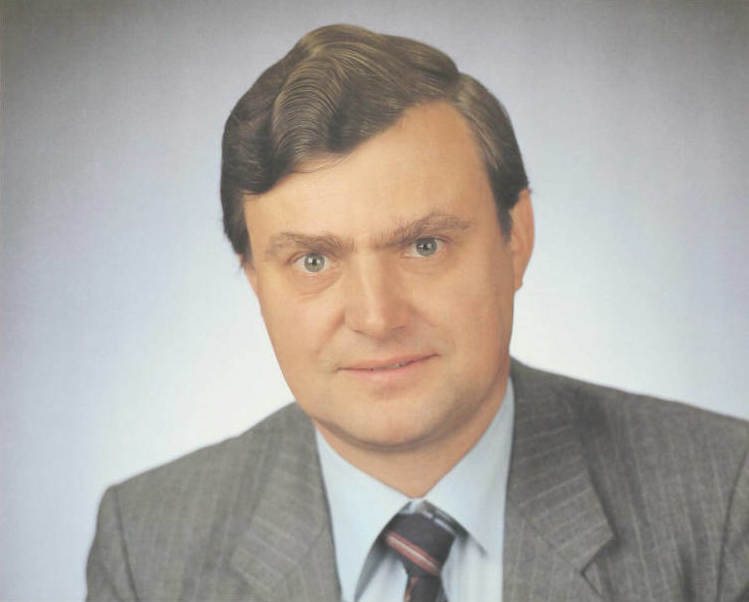
- Pfeifer in 1983

Member of the Bundestag; for Reutlingen
- In office 20 October 1969 – 17 October 2002
- Preceded by: Kurt Härzschel
- Succeeded by: Ernst-Reinhard Beck

Personal details
- Born: 21 March 1937 (age 89) Villingen-Schwenningen, Germany
- Party: Christian Democratic Union
- Children: 2
- Education: University of Tübingen; University of Bonn

Anton Pfeifer (born 21 March 1937) is a German politician of the Christian Democratic Union (CDU) and former member of the German Bundestag.

== Political career ==
Pfeifer was a member of the German Bundestag from 1969 to 2002. He always entered the Bundestag as a directly elected member of the Reutlingen constituency.

== Literature ==
Herbst, Ludolf; Jahn, Bruno (2002). Vierhaus, Rudolf (ed.). Biographisches Handbuch der Mitglieder des Deutschen Bundestages. 1949–2002 [Biographical Handbook of the Members of the German Bundestag. 1949–2002] (in German). München: De Gruyter - De Gruyter Saur. p. 1715. ISBN 978-3-11-184511-1.
