= Ernst-Reinhard Beck =

German politician

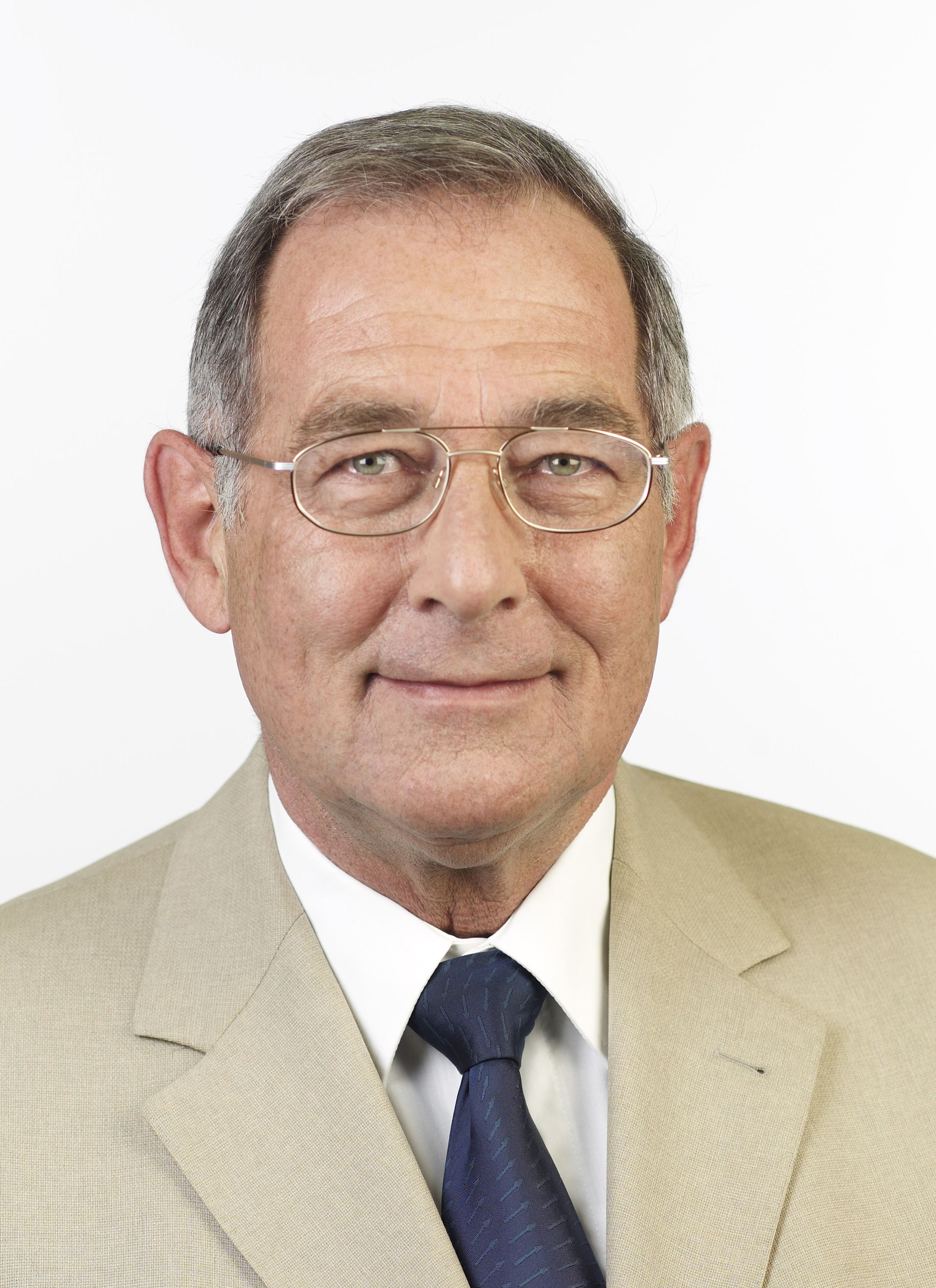
- Beck in 2010

Member of the Bundestag; for Reutlingen
- In office 17 October 2002 – 22 October 2013
- Preceded by: Anton Pfeifer
- Succeeded by: Michael Donth

Personal details
- Born: 31 August 1945 (age 80) Frohnstetten, Germany
- Party: Christian Democratic Union
- Education: University of Tübingen

Ernst-Reinhard Beck (born 31 August 1945) is a German politician and member of the conservative CDU.

A secondary school teacher by profession and former principal, Beck was a directly elected member of the Bundestag between 2002 and 2013, serving for the electoral district of Reutlingen.

Beck was spokesman on defense policy for the fraction of the Christian Democrats and chairman of the curators of the Bundeszentrale für politische Bildung.

Beck holds the rank of Colonel (retired) in the Army Reserves of the Bundeswehr. He has been president of the Verband der Reservisten der Deutschen Bundeswehr (German Reservist's Association) from 2003 until 2009. Beck is married since 1971. His brother Michael Beck is the mayor of Tuttlingen.

== Awards and decorations ==
- Officer of the National Order of Merit (France)
- Knight of the Ordre des Palmes Académiques (France)
- Companion of the National Order of Merit (Malta)
- Bundeswehr Cross of Honour in Gold
- Staufer Medal of Baden-Württemberg
- Golden Badge of Honour of the Association of the German Armed Forces Reservists
- Command Medal of the Second Corps of the Bundeswehr
- 2013: Merit Cross on Ribbon (Verdienstkreuz am Bande)

Other offices
Preceded by Helmut Rauber	President of the Reservist Association of Deutsche Bundeswehr; 2003–2009	Succeeded by Gerd Höfer
