= Achalm =

Mountain in Baden-Württemberg, Germany

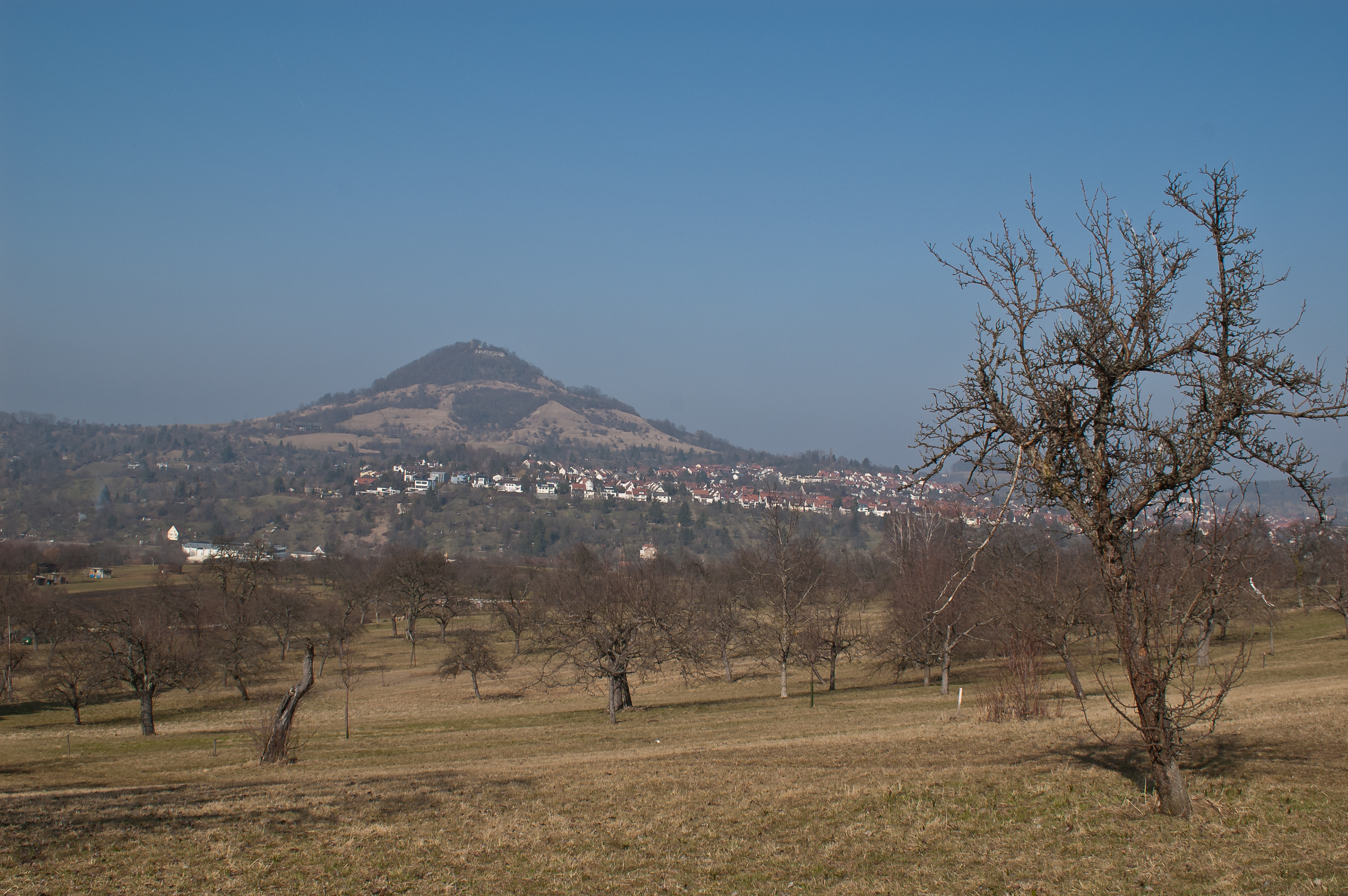
- View of the mountain Achalm from above Pfullingen

Highest point
- Elevation: 707 m (2,320 ft)
- Isolation: 2.64 km (1.64 mi) to Schafhausberg
- Coordinates: 48°30′N 9°15′E

Geography
- Location within Baden-Württemberg
- Location: Baden-Württemberg, Germany

Achalm (German pronunciation: [ˈaxalm]) is a mountain in Reutlingen, Germany. On its top, the ruins of Achalm Castle can be found, ancestral seat of the counts of Achalm, a 13th-century Swabian noble family related to the counts of Urach.

The toponym is probably from the Indo-European root *ak-/*ok „sharp, cliff“. A popular etymology connects it to the supposed last words of count Egino, which is attributed to the balladist Ludwig Uhland in his "Schlacht bei Reutlingen". It is said he wanted to say "Ach Allmächtiger!" (German for "O Almighty!"), but was only able to say "Ach Allm...".
