= Georgenberg (Pfullingen) =

German mountain

Coordinates: 48°28′N 9°13′E

Georgenberg (Reutlingen)

Highest point
- Elevation: 602 m (1,975 ft)

Geography
- Location: Baden-Württemberg, Germany

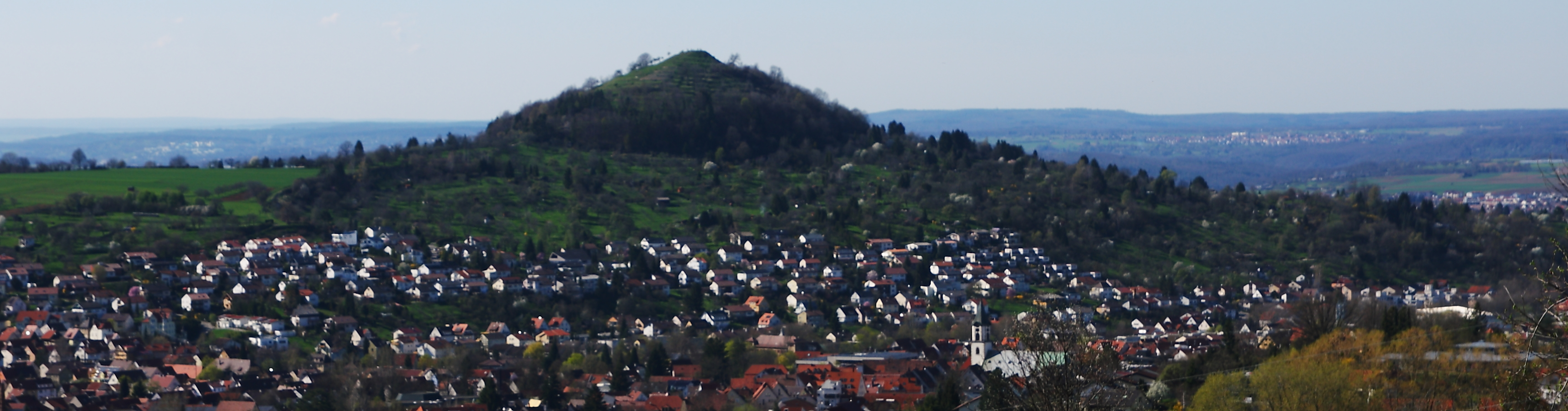
The Pfullinger side of the Georgenberg seen from the south (April 2011)

The Georgenberg is a mountain in the middle of the German state of Baden-Württemberg.

The slopes of the Georgenberg were originally used by the inhabitants of Reutlingen and Pfullingen to grow wine, which is why terraced landscape structures can still be seen below the summit.
