= Volksmarching =

Fitness walking

Volksmarching (from German "Volksmarsch", people's march) is a form of non-competitive fitness walking that developed in Europe in the mid-late 1960s. By 1968, the International Federation of Popular Sports (better known as the "IVV") was formed by Germany, Austria, Liechtenstein and Switzerland. The national emblems of these four countries were placed in a wreath to form the symbol IVV. The IVV Headquarters is located in Altötting, Germany (Bavaria) and the official languages of the IVV are English and German, though French is also used unofficially.

Though walking is the primary activity, the volkssporting movement also includes bicycling, swimming, cross-country skiing or snow-shoeing, and other approved activities. Special provisions also allow for people with disabilities to participate in most events. Participants typically walk 5 kilometers (3.1 mi), 10 kilometers (6.2 mi), 20 kilometers (12 mi) or longer, on a predetermined outdoor path or trail, with the aid of posted signs or markings, or a map and a set of written directions. Volksmarching associations offer incentive awards (including certificates, pins and patches) for participating in a certain number of events and for covering different cumulative distances over time. Volksmarching participants enjoy recording distances and event participation in international record books.

IVV members around the world organize more than 7,500 events each year for an estimated participation of 10,000,000 people. People of all ages and abilities participate. As of 2019, IVV Membership includes 29 National Federations (Australia, Austria, Belgium, Brazil, Canada, China, Czech Republic, Denmark, Estonia, Finland, France, Germany, Great Britain, Greece, Hungary, Italy, Japan, Korea, Luxembourg, Netherlands, Norway, Poland, Romania, Slovakia, Sweden, Switzerland/Liechtenstein, Southern Tyrol, Taiwan and the United States) as well as 12 additional "direct members" in Andorra, CapVerde, Croatia, Ireland, Indonesia, Lithuania, New Zealand, Russia, Serbia, Slovenia and Spain—representing 4,000 local clubs and making volkssporting available in at least 40 countries worldwide. Members are loosely organized under three geographic groupings: IVV-Europe, IVV-Asia and IVV-Americas. Less frequently used terms are Volkswanderung and Volkswalk.
