= Beate Müller-Gemmeke =

German politician (born 1960)

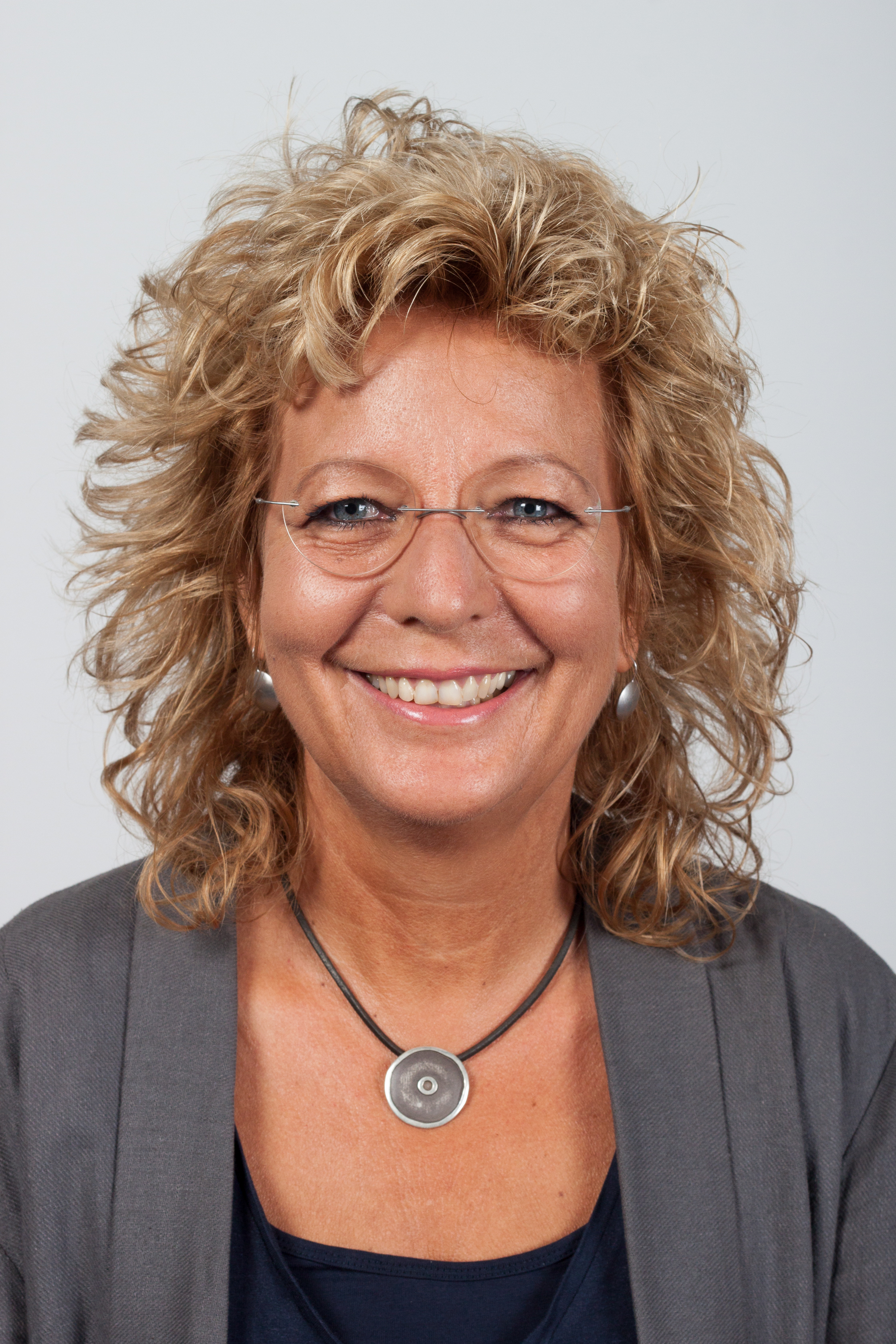
- Beate Müller-Gemmeke in 2014

Member of the Bundestag
- Incumbent
- Assumed office 2009

Personal details
- Born: 7 October 1960 (age 65) Frankfurt, West Germany (now Germany)
- Party: Greens
- Children: 2

Beate Müller-Gemmeke (born 7 October 1960) is a German politician. of the Alliance 90/The Greens who has been serving as a member of the Bundestag from the state of Baden-Württemberg since 2009.

== Early life and career ==
Müller-Gemmeke attended a grammar school in Böblingen until 1978, after which she trained as a teacher in Tübingen. In 1978, she obtained her entrance qualification for a university of applied sciences and studied social education at the Protestant University of Applied Sciences for Social Work in Reutlingen from 1984 to 1988.

From 2002 until her election to the Bundestag, Müller-Gemmeke worked as a self-employed social pedagogue.

== Political career ==
Müller-Gemmeke first became a member of the Bundestag in the 2009 German federal election. In parliament, she is a member of the Committee on Labour and Social Affairs and the Committee on Petitions. For her group she is spokesperson for workers' rights and active labour market policy and coordinator in the Trade Union and Social Advisory Council.

In the negotiations to form a coalition government under the leadership of Minister-President of Baden-Württemberg Winfried Kretschmann following the 2021 state elections, Müller-Gemmeke was a member of the working group on economic affairs, labor and innovation.

In the negotiations to form a so-called traffic light coalition of the Social Democratic Party (SPD), the Green Party and the Free Democratic Party (FDP) on the national level following the 2021 German elections, Müller-Gemmeke was part of her party's delegation in the working group on labour policy, co-chaired by Hubertus Heil, Katharina Dröge and Johannes Vogel.

In October 2024, Müller-Gemmeke announced, that she isn't seeking re-election for Bundestag in 2025.
