= Wannweil =

- Municipality
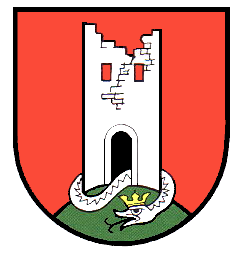
- Coat of arms

- Location of Wannweil within Reutlingen district
- Interactive map of Wannweil
- Location within Germany Location within Baden-Württemberg
- Coordinates: 48°30′53″N 09°09′03″E
- Country: Germany
- State: Baden-Württemberg
- Admin. region: Tübingen
- District: Reutlingen

Government
  - Mayor (2018–26): Christian Majer

Area
  - Total: 5.34 km^{2} (2.06 sq mi)
- Elevation: 332 m (1,089 ft)

Population (2025-12-31)
  - Total: 5,312
  - Density: 995/km^{2} (2,580/sq mi)
- Time zone: UTC+01:00 (CET)
  - Summer (DST): UTC+02:00 (CEST)
- Postal codes: 72827
- Dialling codes: 07121
- Vehicle registration: RT
- Website: www.wannweil.de

Wannweil (German pronunciation: [ˈvanvaɪl]) is a municipality in the district of Reutlingen in Baden-Württemberg in Germany. It is located 5 kilometers northwest of Reutlingen between the cities Reutlingen and Tübingen.

It was home of 1990 soccer world champion Guido Buchwald and of Germany's former president Horst Köhler during his study period in Tübingen.

== History ==
Wannweil was first mentioned in a 1257 Document as Wyle bi Betzingen, the name Wannwyle first appearing in 1465. In 1333, Albrecht of Blankenstein sold Wyle to the Spital of Reutlingen. Since then, it shares its history with the city. With the Treaty of Paris, Wannweil and Reutlingen were given to the Kingdom of Württemberg.

== Politics ==
=== Municipal council ===
The municipal council has 14 elected members and its chairman is the mayor.

Result of the last election

Grün-Alternative Liste Wannweil 8.594 Votes = 4 Seats

CDU 8.432 Votes = 3 Seats

Freie Liste Wannweil 7.074 Votes = 3 Seats

SPD 5.388 Votes = 2 seats

Freie Wählervereinigung 3.595 Votes = 1 Seats

Bürgerbeteiligung in Wannweil 3.546 Votes = 1 Seats

=== Mayor ===
The mayor is elected for 8 years.

- 1967–1995: Rüdiger Scherret
- 1995–2018: Anette Rösch
- since 2018: Dr. Christian Majer

=== Crest ===
Blazon: "In red on a green hill a ruin of a silver tower, around whose foot, out of the black gate, a silver snake with a golden crown winds."

=== Town twinning ===
A partnership has been in place since May 2003 with the French municipality Mably (Loire department). Exchange meetings usually take place on Ascension Day.

== Religion ==
A church in Wannweil was first mentioned in 1275. The place has been Evangelical-Lutheran since the introduction of the Reformation in Reutlingen in 1530. Today there is one evangelical and one Roman Catholic parish in the village. In addition, the Volksmission entschiedener Christen ("People's Mission of Committed Christians") and the New Apostolic Church are active in Wannweil.

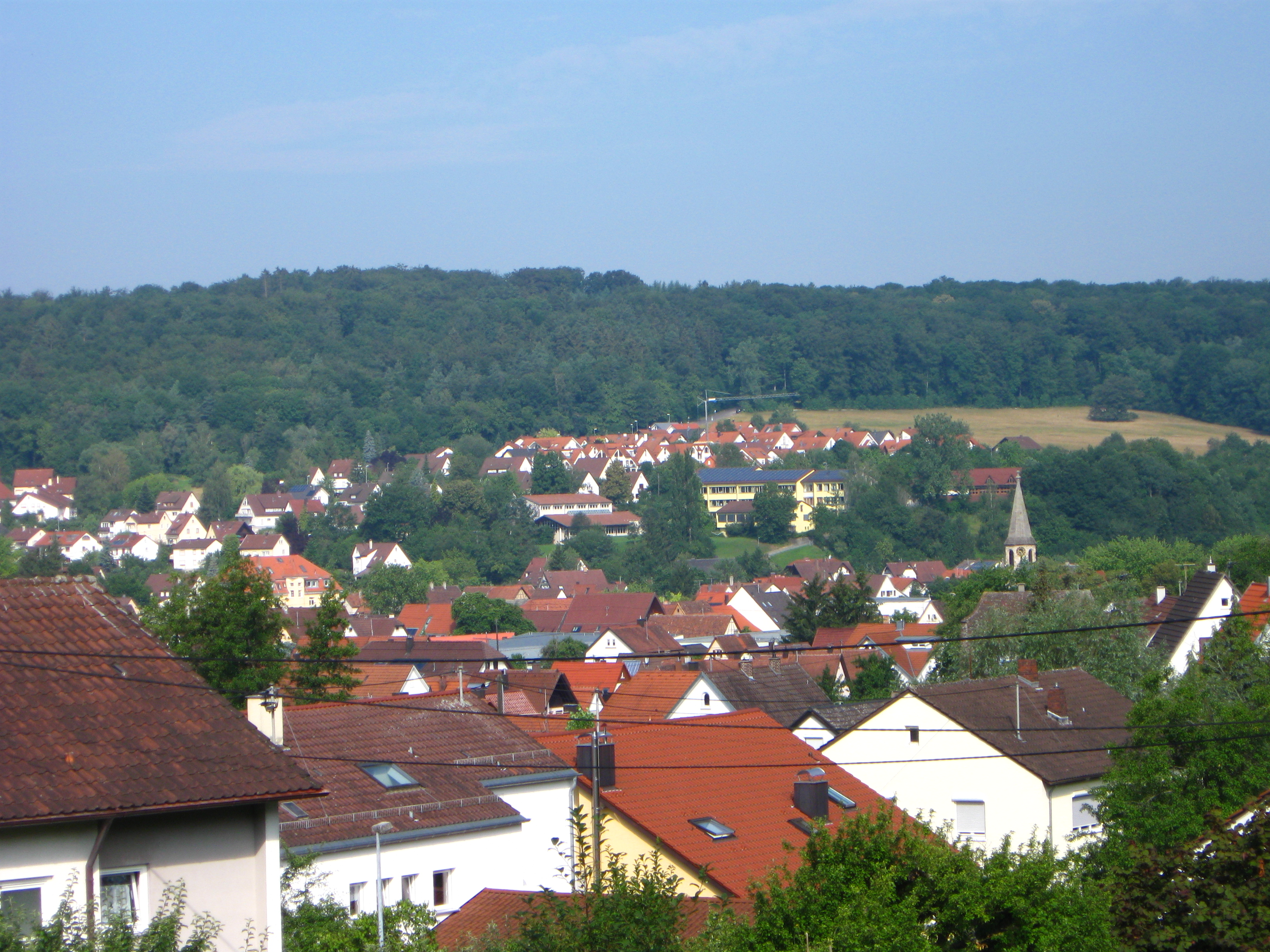
Wannweil
