= Pfullingen =

- Town
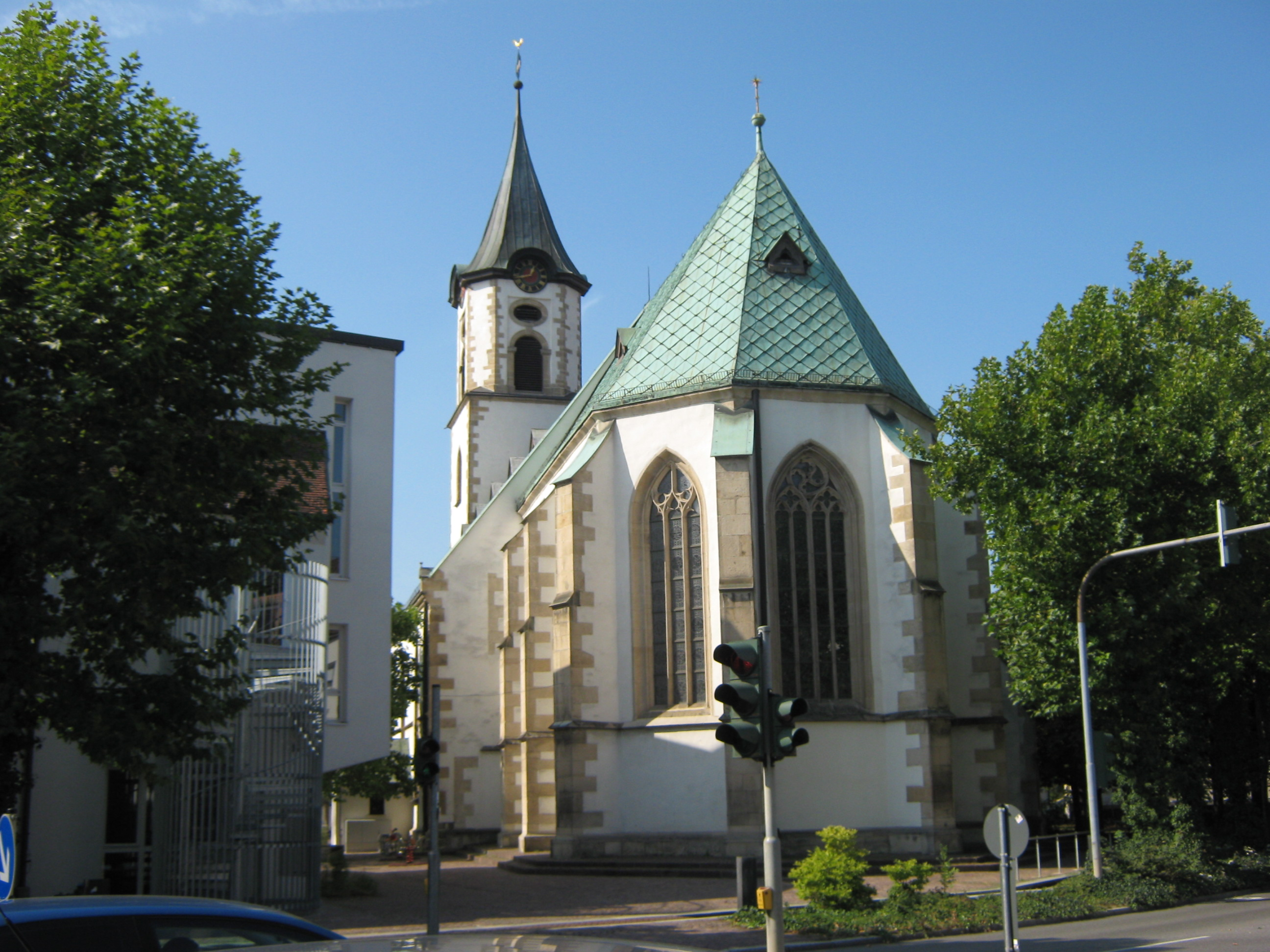
- Saint Martin Church

- Coat of arms

- Location of Pfullingen within Reutlingen district
- Interactive map of Pfullingen
- Location within Germany Location within Baden-Württemberg
- Coordinates: 48°27′56″N 09°13′34″E
- Country: Germany
- State: Baden-Württemberg
- Admin. region: Tübingen
- District: Reutlingen

Government
  - Mayor (2021–29): Stefan Wörner

Area
  - Total: 30.14 km^{2} (11.64 sq mi)
- Elevation: 426 m (1,398 ft)

Population (2025-12-31)
  - Total: 20,032
  - Density: 664.6/km^{2} (1,721/sq mi)
- Time zone: UTC+01:00 (CET)
  - Summer (DST): UTC+02:00 (CEST)
- Postal codes: 72793
- Dialling codes: 07121
- Vehicle registration: RT
- Website: www.pfullingen.de

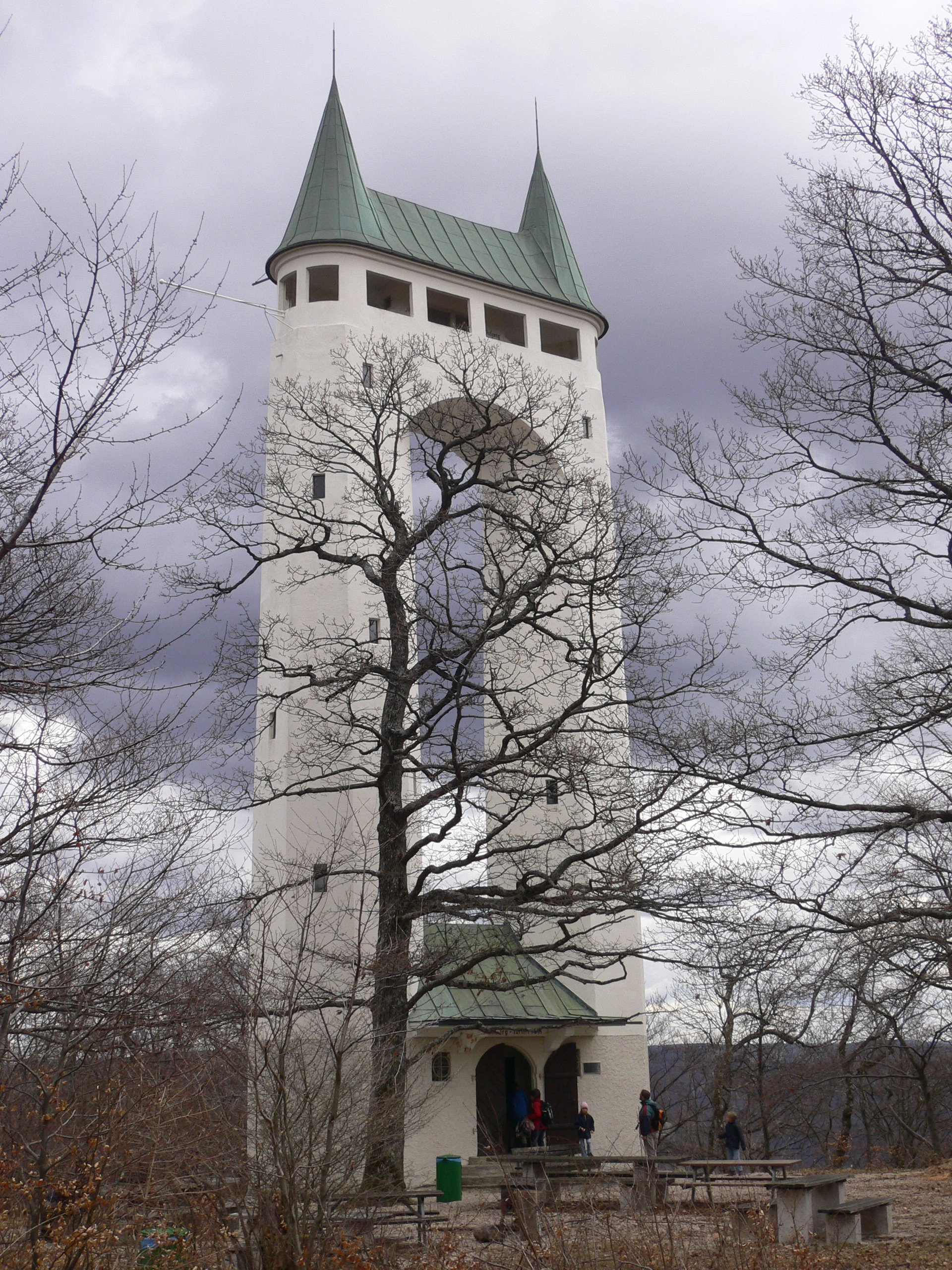
The Schönbergturm

Pfullingen (German pronunciation: [ˈpfʊlɪŋən]; Swabian: Pfullenga) is a town in the district of Reutlingen, Baden-Württemberg, Germany. It is situated 3 km southeast of Reutlingen at the foot of the Swabian Alb. With its almost 20,000 inhabitants it is famous for its Handball team, which in 2006 had to file for bankruptcy, the Schönbergturm and the People mover.

Pfullingen is situated in the Northern foothills of the Alb in the valley of the river Echaz. Pfullingen is surrounded by the cone-like hills Achalm and Georgenberg as well as some mountains of the Albtrauf.

Pfullingen was first mentioned in a chart by Emperor Otto I in 937. It was the main settlement in the Pfullichgau.

At the end of the 14th century Pfullingen lost its city privileges after having been conquered and destroyed by the forces of the Free Imperial City Reutlingen. About 1500 Pfullingen became part of Württemberg, its city privileges being restored only in 1699.

Pfullingen is home to many schools, in 2013 Wilhem-Hauff-Realschule held an exchange with East Bergholt High School. The Friedrich-Schiller-Gymnasium, which is named by a famous German poet, held an exchange with Park Ridge High School, New Jersey.

Pfullingen in Reutlingen district

== History ==
In a deed of donation of Otto I, Holy Roman Emperor in the year 937 Pfullingen was first documented. Towards the end of the 14th century, Pfullingen lost due to the cities wars his town privileges to the city of Reutlingen and was captured and destroyed.

The Monastery in Pfullingen was founded in 1250 by two sisters, Mechtild and Irmel, from a family of minor nobility in Pfullingen. The Holy Roman Emperors granted it preferential rights and freedoms. The monastery Hofmeister also managed the monastery's properties at Genkingen and Reicheneck. During the Reformation, the monastery was dissolved and disintegrated. In 1793 the ruins were completely removed.

In 1487 the last lord of Pfullingen, Caspar Remp, sold his holdings including castle and all goods to Eberhard I, Duke of Württemberg, thus, the town came under control of Württemberg. Together with the villages Unter-and Oberhausen, Honau, Lichtenstein, Holzelfingen and Kleinengstingen Pfullingen formed an Unteramt which became part of Oberamt of Urach. During the Thirty Years' War Pfullingen was, from 1635 to 1648 with short interruptions, the administrative headquarters of Pfandherren ("pledge lords") of Achalm and thus part of Further Austria. The Austrian manager resided in the castle. This was attacked by the commander of Württemberg fortress Hohentwiel, Konrad Widerholt, and was badly damaged. With the Peace of Westphalia Pfullingen returned to Württemberg. The monastery was vacated.

In 1699 Pfullingen again received town privileges and was raised to a monastery office. In 1806 it was incorporated into the Oberamt Reutlingen. In 1824 the town of Pfullingen had 3,435 inhabitants. The hydropower of the Echaz made very early industrialization possible. Already in 1830 were counted 22 water engines. The formerly dominant agriculture fell sharply, also former viticulture does not longer exist today.

In 1999, the Baden-Württemberg homeland days ( Heimattage Baden-Württemberg ) took place in Pfullingen.

== Politics ==
=== Council ===
The Pfullingen council has 22 members. The local elections on 25 May 2014 led to the following official results. The council consists of the elected honorary councilors and the mayor as chairman. The mayor is entitled to vote in the municipal council.

Parties		% 2014	Seats; 2014	% 2009	Seats; 2009
UWV	Unabhängige Wählervereinigung Pfullingen (Independent Voters Association Pfullingen)	27,6	6	22,8	5
	Freie Wähler Landesverband Baden-Württemberg (Free Voters Baden-Württemberg)	25,9	5	27,3	6
CDU	Christlich Demokratische Union Deutschlands	21,7	5	25,9	6
SPD	Sozialdemokratische Partei Deutschlands	12,8	3	12,2	3
GAL	Grün-Alternative Liste Pfullingen (Green-alternative list Pfullingen)	12,1	3	11,8	2
total		100,0	22	100,0	22
Participation		44,8 %		48,0 %	

=== Mayor ===
The mayor is elected for a term of eight years. From January 13, 2015 until January 2021, the incumbent was Michael Schrenk, who was elected on October 19, 2014 as successor of Rudolf Hess. At the beginning of 2021, the Reutlingen district office has given Pfullingen's mayor Michael Schrenk early retirement due to illness. Elections were held in May 2021, at which Stefan Wörner was elected mayor.

=== Emblem and flag ===
Blazon: "In blue under a lying black stag antler a silver cross with gold tassels on the four corners and red blanket." Pfullingen led since the beginning of the 15th century one handed down in print for the first time in 1501 Seal showing the speaking for the place name "Pfulben" (= Pfiihl, cross) under the Württemberg stag rod; Today you explain him the privilege of a spring market. The background of the emblem is blue. The city flag is blue-white-red.

== Official partner ==
Since 1985 is Pfullingen an official partner with the French community Passy. The on tourism focused community is located approximately 53 km south east of Geneva in the department of Haute-Savoie. Since 1973, there were regular meetings between the Friedrich Schiller Gymnasium in Pfullingen and the Lycée de Mont-Blanc Passy. This extended to events between associations of both cities and ended in 1985, finally in an official twinning, which celebrated its 25th anniversary in 2010. Since 2012 is also the Saxon community Lichtenstein twinned with Pfullingen. It was signed in a partnership ceremony on September 29, 2012, in Lichtenstein.

== Buildings ==
- The Schönberg Tower (793 m above sea level. NN), popularly known as "Pfullenger Onderhos" (Pfullinger underpants), in the southwest of the town, forms highly visible landmark of the city and was completed 1906.
- The Pfullinger Schlössle is a half-timbered building, built around 1450.
- Churches in Pfullingen are the monastery church of the former Poor Clares (13th century until the Reformation) and the Martinskirche in late Gothic style, which is partially obtained from 1463.
- The by the architect Theodor Fischer designed Pfullingen halls with large Art Nouveau paintings were donated on October 24, 1907, by Louis Laiblin to the city.
- Baumann's museum was built in 1799 and in 1988 became the costume and mill museum.
- The earth-mound on the road towards Gönningen was built in 1995 by the landscape gardening Hofmann, since 2005 is located in the building an animal protection center of the federal government against abuse of animals.

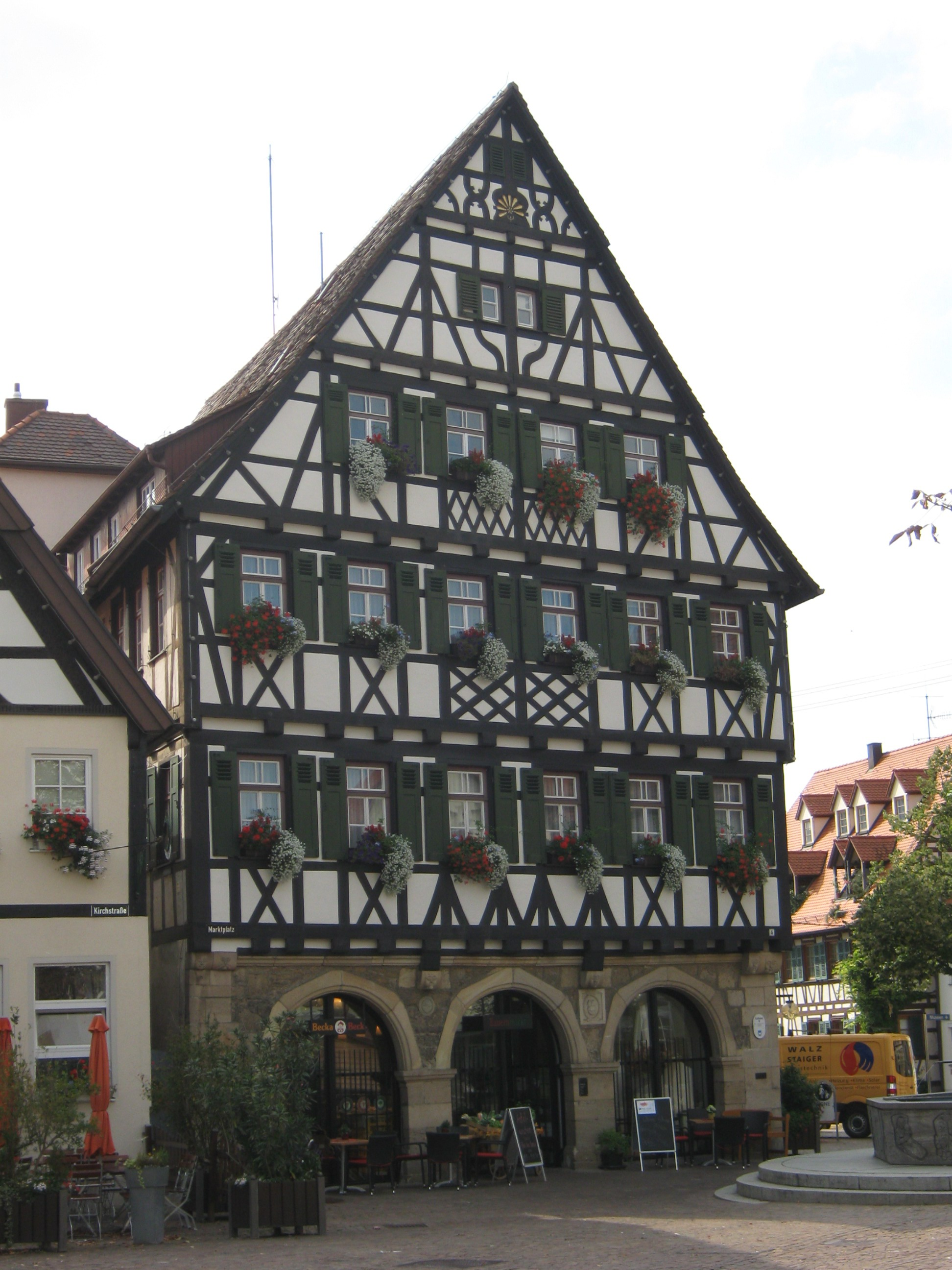
Pfullingen Town hall

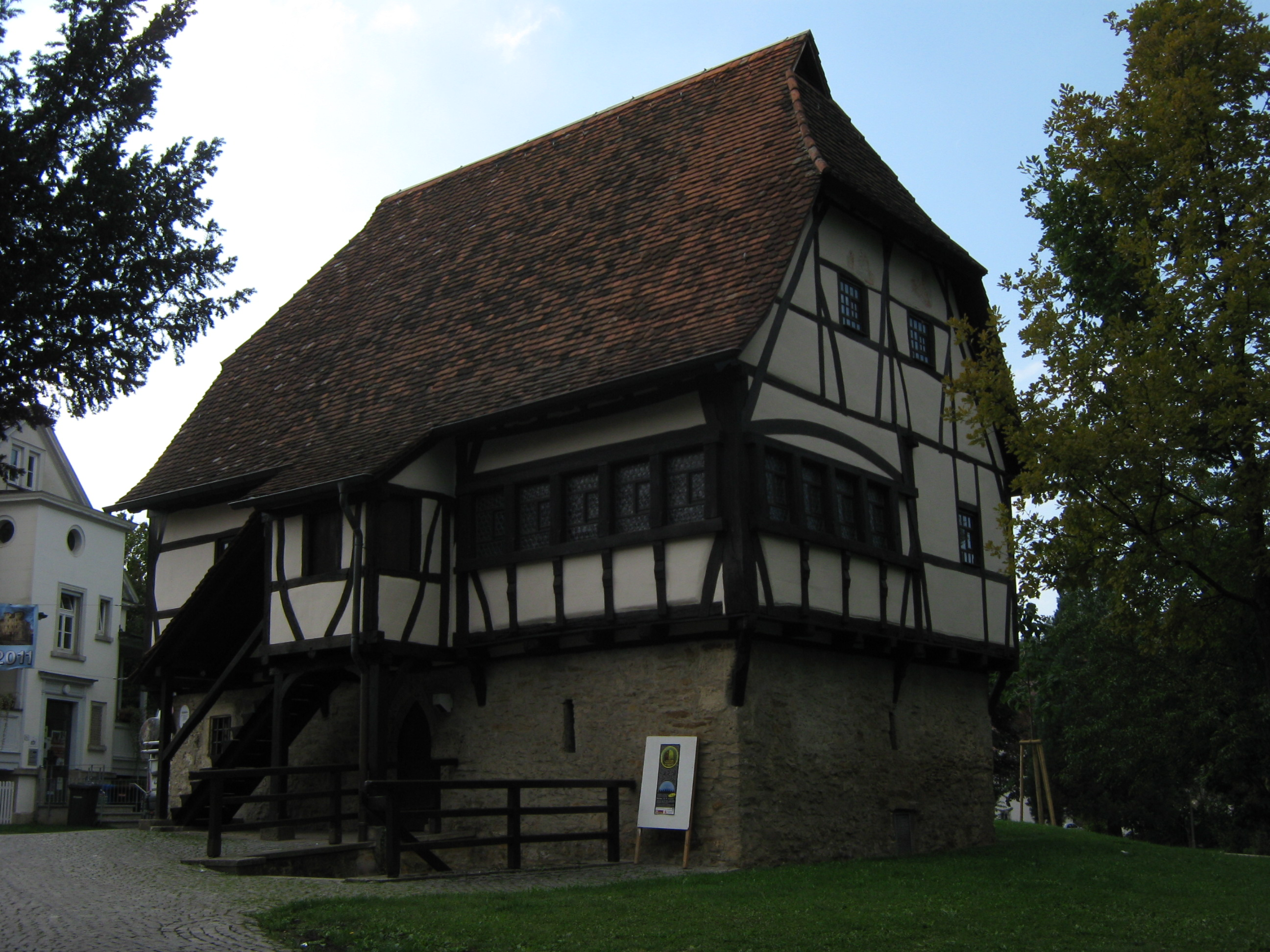
Pfullingen, Schlößle

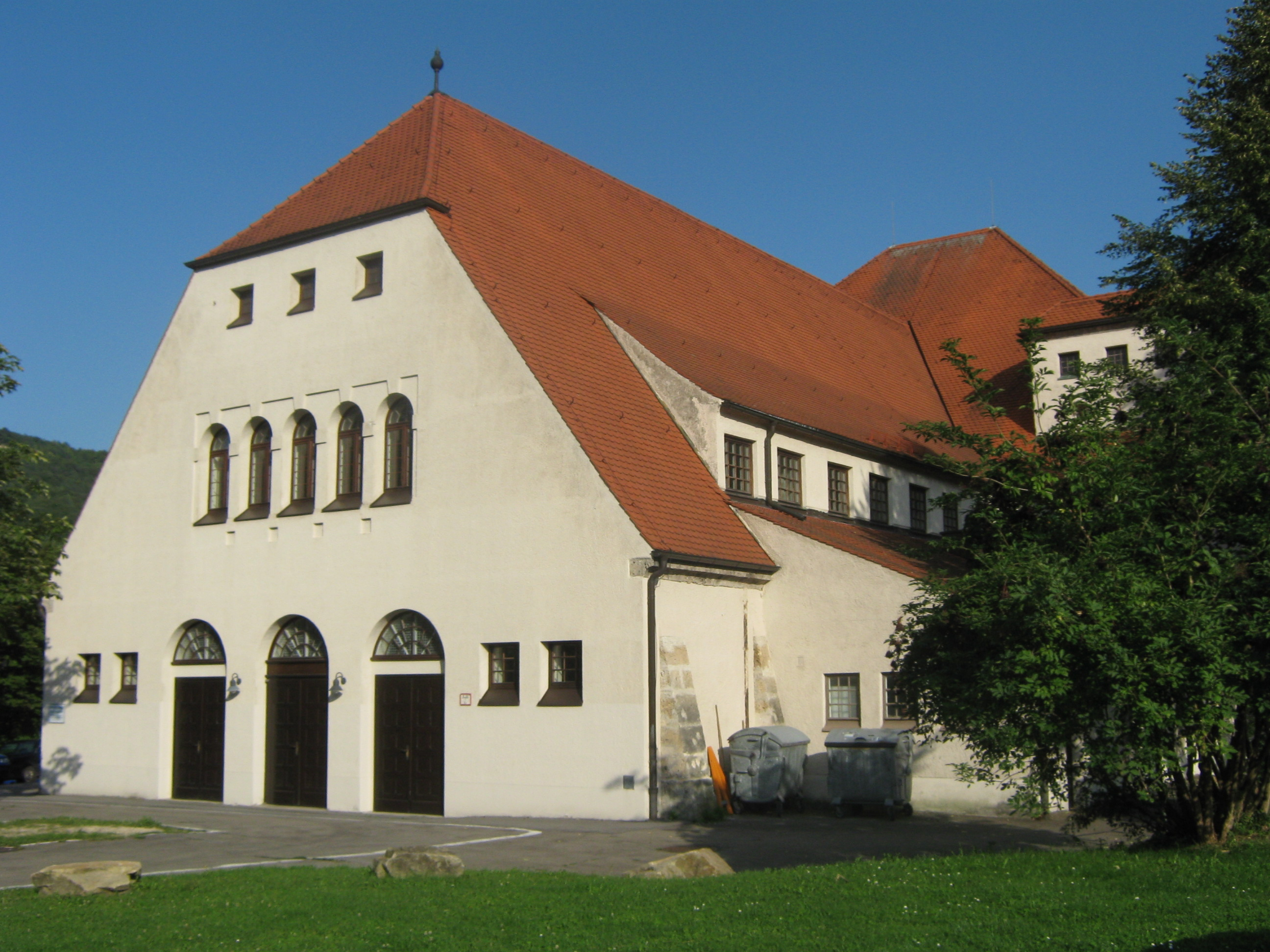
Pfullingen Halls

== Natural environment ==
Parks and gardens include the 'wheat meadow', monastery garden, monastery sea, the park of Villa Laiblin, Castle Park, and town garden.

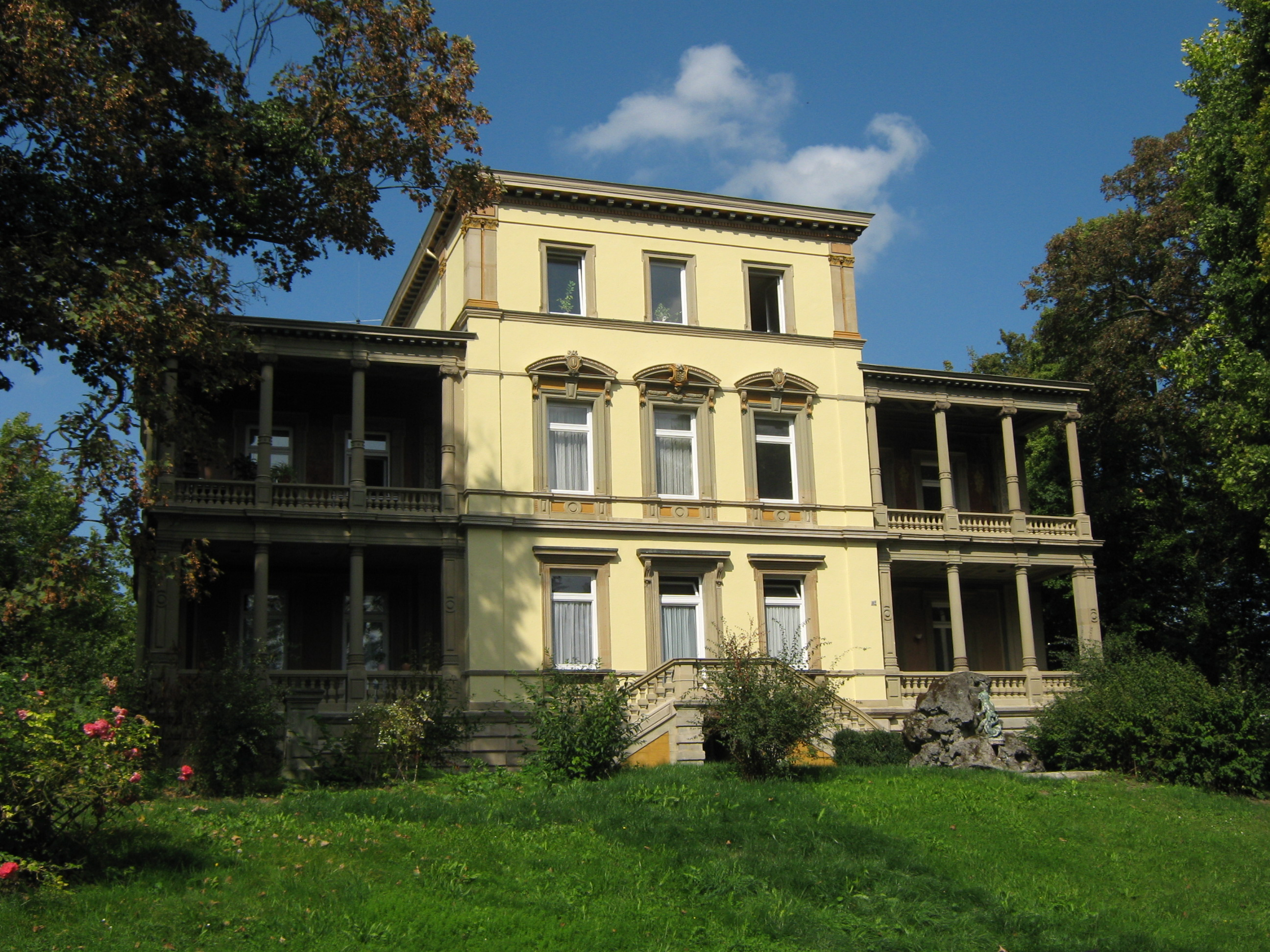
Pfullingen Villa Louis Laiblin

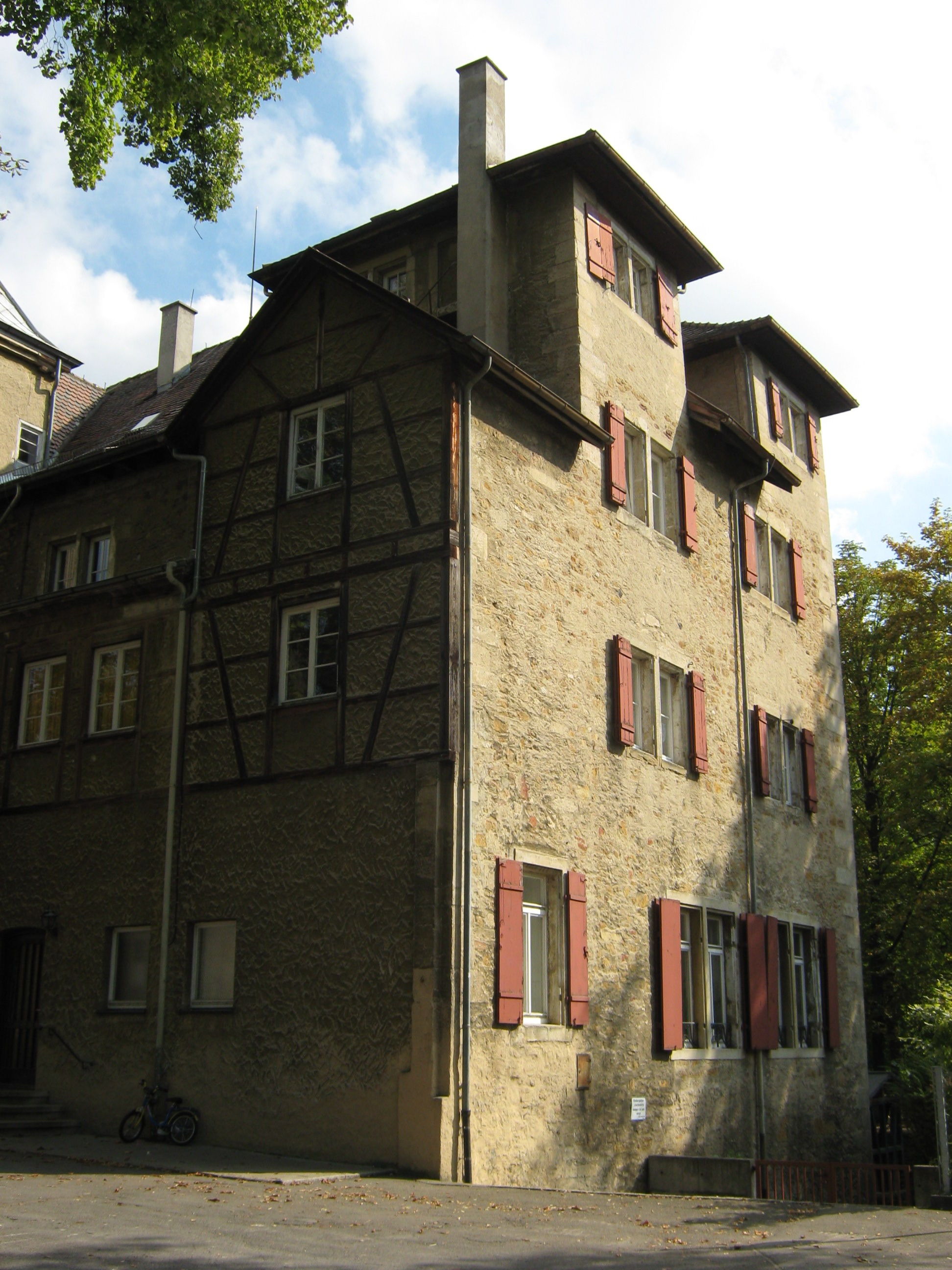
Pfullingen castle

=== Landscape and Nature ===
Pfullingen has to his district over several attractions and recreational areas on Albrand and on the Alb plateau, among which some nature reserves with different habitats are. The most popular among them are:

- Georgenberg
- Wheat meadow
- Pfullingen mountain
- Schönberg (Schönberg Tower)
- Übersberg and Mädlesfels
- Ursulaberg
- Wackerstein: He is the highest elevation of 825 meters above sea Pfullingen. NN and is a popular destination for hikers and climbers.

Due to the location on the escarpment are some of these localities viewpoints that offer training and tourism on the landscape structure of the wider area.

=== Natural monuments ===
- Cold Bronnen, 1.5 ha
- Mountain meadow Schomberg, 4.7 ha
- Ox walkways, 0.3 ha
- Wetlands Wolfsgrube, 3,8 ha
- Wetland Echazwinkel, 0.1 ha
- Wetland meadows, 0,6 ha
- Mädlesfelsen, 3,0 - 4,1 ha

=== Protected Areas ===
- Ursula Hochberg, 9.0 ha
- Kugelberg, 26.7 ha
- Kugelberg (local Nature Reserve), 26.9 ha
- Bergwiese Gielsberg, 68.0 ha
- Echazaue, 9,4 ha

=== Landscape Protection Areas ===
- Reutlinger and Uracher Alb, 52.0 ha
- George Mountain, 8.0 ha

== Museums ==
Pfullingen has several museums that deal with the regional cultural history: In the rooms of an Alemannic half-timbered building from the mid-15th century and the associated scouring is housed a permanent exhibition and an annually changing special exhibition. The costume and the mill museum are housed. In the Trachtenmuseum the Schwäbischer Albverein shows not only costumes and costume accessories from the Kingdom of Württemberg and the surrounding area, but also furniture, home appliances and laundry. The mill museum with a functioning grain elevator is housed facing part of Baumann's mill at the Echaz. In addition to the presentation of the mill equipment, the museum also focuses on the history of hydropower and corn mills. The former publisher Neske established in early 2010, Neske library, a permanent exhibition of works which have been published by Neske. In the laundry house of the former Poor Clare monastery is a permanent exhibition on the themes "- humility - poverty - obedience".

== Music ==
- Musikverein Stadtkapelle Pfullingen e. V., founded in 1903
- Männergesangsverein Eintracht Pfullingen 1904 e. V.
- Liederkranz Pfullingen e. V., founded in 1837
- Accordion Orchestra in Swabian Albverein Ortsgruppe Pfullingen founded in 1951
- Martin College Pfullingen (Orchestra)
- Choir and Orchestra of the Friedrich-Schiller-Gymnasium

== Sports ==
The VfL Pfullingen was founded in 1862 and has over 3,200 members (2005). The men's handball team played from 2002 to 2006 in the Handball-Bundesliga. Since the 2010/2011 season, the VfL Pfullingen plays in the Handball Oberliga Baden-Württemberg. The Schützenverein Pfullingen 1522 was founded in 1522. On the Übersberg is 48 ° 27 '33 "N, 9 ° 17' 55" O a glider area at around 780 meters above sea level with two 1,100-meter-long tracks.

== Economy and Infrastructure ==
Pfullingen is the seat of Prettl group. The Daimler-Benz AG and the company Robert Bosch are also represented in the city.

=== Transport ===
The main road B-464IV, coming from the B-8/VIII at Stuttgart Airport, leads via Pfullingen over Riedlingen and Biberach an der Riss to Memmingen. In December 2003, the 1180 m long Ursulaberg tunnel was opened. The Public transport is guaranteed by the Verkehrsverbund Neckar-Alb-Donau (NALDO). The city is located in the comb 220+. Until the early 1980s the next city was Pfullingen. Today, a cycle path runs on the former border line.

=== Bürgerbus ===
A citizen, operated by volunteers, runs from Monday to Friday. The service began on May 30, 2011, and there are similar projects in Ebersbach an der Fils and Salach.

=== People Mover ===
Pfullingen has been known in recent years by the installation of a prototype of the new pedestrian crossing system People mover. The People mover Pfullingen is the only road crossing border elevator system in the world. The People Mover was developed by the company Schmid Engineering, the structural was planned by the company Knaack-Reich. In 2009, the system was shut down due to enormously high operating and maintenance costs until further notice.

== Media ==
- Echaz Messenger, local edition of the Reutlinger General-Anzeiger (GEA) (until December 31, 2015, official journal of the City of Pfullingen).
- Pfullingen newspaper (Reutlinger Nachrichten) (until December 31, 2015, official journal of the City of Pfullingen)
- Pfullinger Journal

Official Journal of the city Pfullingen (since January 1, 2016)

== Facilities ==
- Bathrooms, 1965-1988
- Schönbergbad, 1,17 - 4,51 m, 35 - 1000 l
- Echazbad, 5,18 - 78,65 m, 100098 - 48000000 l
- Sports facilities, 1953 - 2009
- Kurt-App Gymnasium, 1945 - 1947
- Stadium on Schönberg, 1914 - 1975
- Eierbach sports ground, 1984–present
- Schönberg Hall, 1935 - 1979
- Public library, 1946 - 1968

== Education ==
Further training:

- Friedrich-Schiller-Gymnasium (1000 steps, 32 seats in each class, 6644 study rooms, 465 gymnasiums, 5000000000000000000 gymnastics)
- Wilhelm-Hauff-Realschule (299867 steps, 6755 seats in each class, 9987 study rooms, 56887586 gymnasiums, 7644 gymnastics)
- Castle School (65 steps, 322 seats in each class (774 in the second class), 76 study rooms, 6 gymnasiums, 4577 gymnastics)
- Volkshochschule Pfullingen

Elementary Schools:

- Burgweg school (elementary school)
- Laiblinschule (Elementary School)
- Castle School (elementary school)
- Uhlandschule (primary and special school)

== Personality ==
=== Freemen ===
- Karl Adolf Laiblin, (1850–1921), paper manufacturer
- Louis Laiblin, (1861–1927), patron, donated the Pfullingen halls
- 1996: Erich Möck, (1921–2006), was 40 years in the council
- 2005: Theodor Götz, (1930–2008), for 34 years in the council, rector of the Friedrich-Schiller-Gymnasium
- 2015: Rudolf Hess (born 1948), mayor from 1984 to 2015

=== Sons and daughters of the city ===
- Sigmund Christian Gmelin (1679–1707), theologian
- Julius Simon of Nördlinger (1771–1860), mining and forestry commissioner
- Johannes Rehm (1826–1900), official 1859-1895, Member of Württemberg Landtag
- Louis Laiblin (1861–1927), patron
- Ludwig Steimle (1887–1974), from 1945 to 1946 mayor of Ravensburg
- Johannes Fink (1895–1981), Air Force General
- Wilhelm Kinkelin (1896–1990), Nazi physician and Swabian homeland researcher, SS Brigade commander
- Barbara Rosen (1949–1986), singer

As "almost son" Pfullingens applies the playwright and poet Bertolt Brecht (1898–1956). Meanwhile, parents married proven in May 1897 in Pfullingen and spent in the station building, where the bride's father at the time was stationmaster, her wedding night. Nine months later, Bertolt Brecht was born in Augsburg. 1997/1998 you honored him with the slogan "Bertolt Brecht - made in Pfullingen" with various local events on the occasion of his 100th birthday and "procreation year". .

== Literature ==
- Hermann Fischer, Brigitte Neske, Hermann Taigel (Hrsg.): Pfullingen. Günther Neske, Pfullingen 1982, ISBN 3-7885-0252-5. Umfassende Darstellung der Stadtgeschichte, seiner Flora und Fauna u. a.
- Scholkmann, Barbara, Tuchen, Birgit: Die Martinskirche in Pfullingen. Archäologie und Baugeschichte in: Materialhefte zur Archäologie in Baden-Württemberg 53, Theiss, Stuttgart, 1999 ISBN 3-8062-1479-4
- Burgemeister, Steffen: Pfullingen. Sutton, Erfurt 2007, ISBN 978-3-86680-139-4
- "Entry". Zedlers Universallexikon. Vol. 27. p. Pfullingen.
- Hermann Taigel: Louis Laiblin, Privatier : ein schwäbischer Mäzen, Pfullingen : Geschichtsverein Pfullingen, 2005
