= Lichtenstein, Baden-Württemberg =

German municipality

Lichtenstein
- Municipality
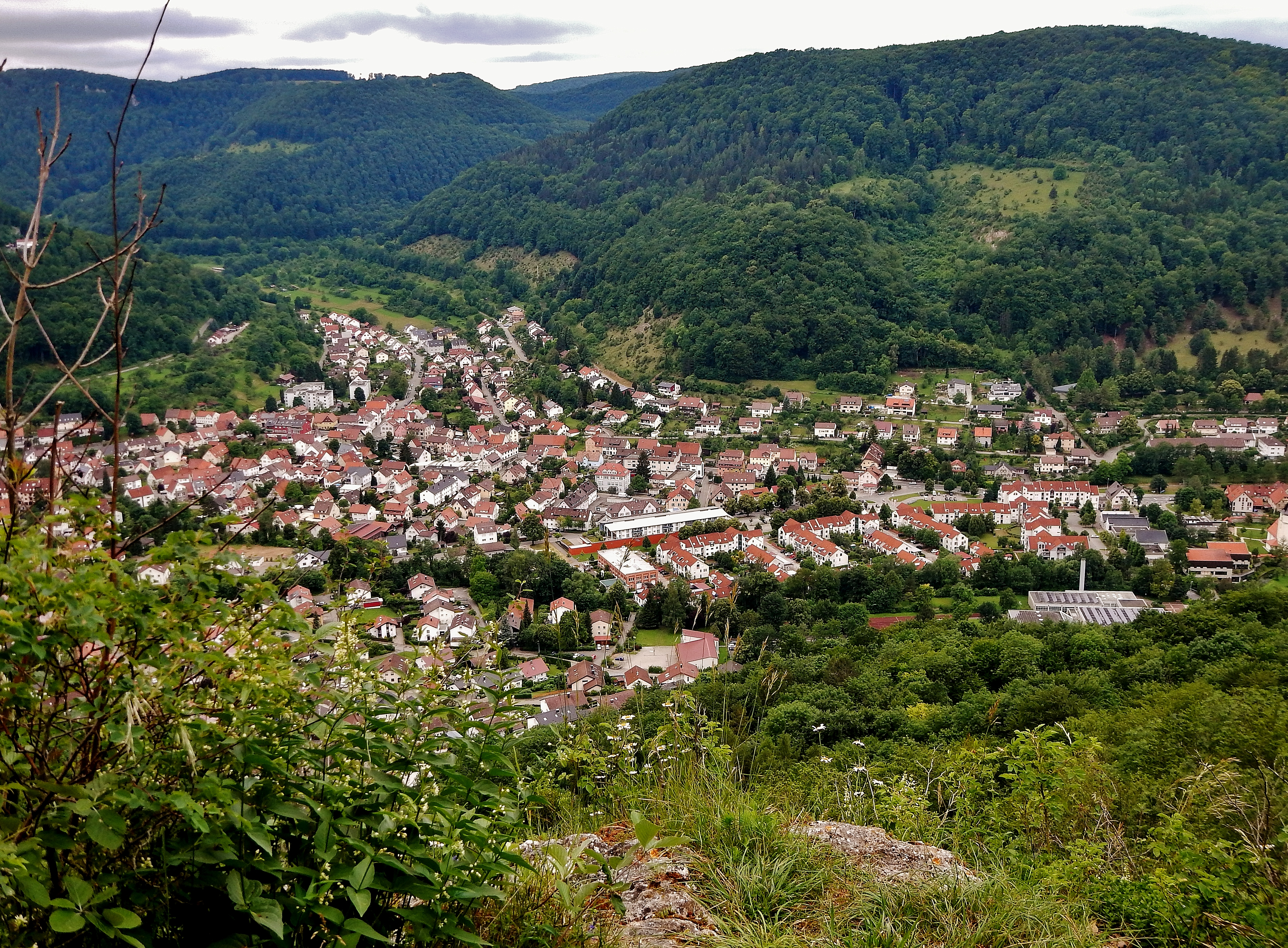
- Lichtenstein from the east

- Coat of arms

- Location of Lichtenstein within Reutlingen district
- Interactive map of Lichtenstein
- Location within Germany Location within Baden-Württemberg
- Coordinates: 48°25′37″N 09°15′13″E
- Country: Germany
- State: Baden-Württemberg
- Admin. region: Tübingen
- District: Reutlingen
- Subdivisions: 4 Ortsteile

Area
  - Total: 34.24 km^{2} (13.22 sq mi)
- Elevation: 507 m (1,663 ft)

Population (2025-12-31)
  - Total: 9,158
  - Density: 267.5/km^{2} (692.7/sq mi)
- Time zone: UTC+01:00 (CET)
  - Summer (DST): UTC+02:00 (CEST)
- Postal codes: 72805
- Dialling codes: 07129
- Vehicle registration: RT
- Website: www.gemeinde-lichtenstein.de

Lichtenstein (German pronunciation: [ˈlɪçtn̩ʃtaɪn]) is a municipality in the Tübingen administrative region in Baden-Württemberg, Germany. It lies at the foot of the Swabian Jura (plateau).

== History ==
The municipality of Lichtenstein was created on 1 January 1975 by the merger of Honau, Holzelfingen and Unterhausen (which had in 1930 merged with Oberhausen). By the agreement made before this merger, Unterhausen changed its name to Lichtenstein, after the famous Lichtenstein Castle above the town. The towns of the municipality expanded substantially from 1975 to 1990 thanks to tourism. Lichtenstein expanded the most, first purchasing an old industrial site in 1979 to turn it into a new town center.

== Geography ==
The municipality (Gemeinde) of Lichtenstein covers 34.24 square kilometres (13.22 mi^{2}) of the Reutlingen district, in the state of the Federal Republic of Germany. It is physically located in the middle of the Swabian Jura, on the edge of the Middle Kuppenalb in the valley of the river Echaz. Elevation above sea level ranges from 466 meters (1,529 ft) to 836 meters (2,743 ft) Normalnull.

The Greuthau, Hohenäcker-Imenberg, and Wonhalde-Spielberg Federally-protected nature reserves (Naturschutzgebiet) are located within the municipality.

== Demographics ==
Population development:

Year	Inhabitants
1990	9,470
2001	9,460
2011	8,880
2021	9,194

== Politics ==
Lichtenstein has been twinned with Voreppe, France, since 1992.

=== Coat of arms ===
The municipal coat of arms for Lichtenstein shows a white wing on a field of blue. This was the coat of arms of the extinct House of Lichtenstein. The pattern was awarded to the municipality by the Federal Ministry of the Interior on 13 August 1975.
