= Güssenburg Castle =

Castle in Baden-Württemberg, Germany

Coordinates: 48°36′2″N 10°14′49″E

- Güssenburg
- Near Hermaringen, Heidenheim County, Baden-Württemberg, Germany
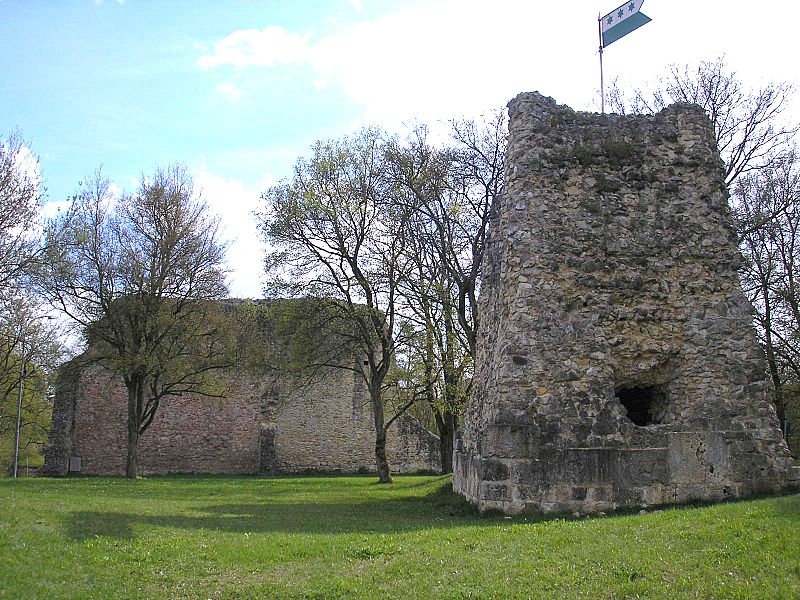
- Ruins of the Güssenburg. The keep and a portion of the curtain wall are visible.

Site information
- Type: Ruined castle
- Owner: Hermaringen community
- Open to the public: Yes
- Condition: Ruined

Location
- Height: Approximately 6 meters (20 ft)

Site history
- Built: Around 1346
- Built by: Unknown
- In use: 1346-1449 (as administrative center)
- Materials: Stone

Güssenburg Castle (also Güssenberg) is a ruined castle on a hill near Hermaringen in Heidenheim County in Baden-Württemberg, Germany. It was built around 1346, during the Late Middle Ages and much of the curtain wall and keep remain.

== Location ==
The ruin sits an elevation of about 500 meters (1,600 ft) above sea level and about 50 m (160 ft) above the floor of the Brenz valley. The castle hill, known as the Schloßberg, is very steep on the north, west and east sides which made it an ideal location for a fortification.

== History ==
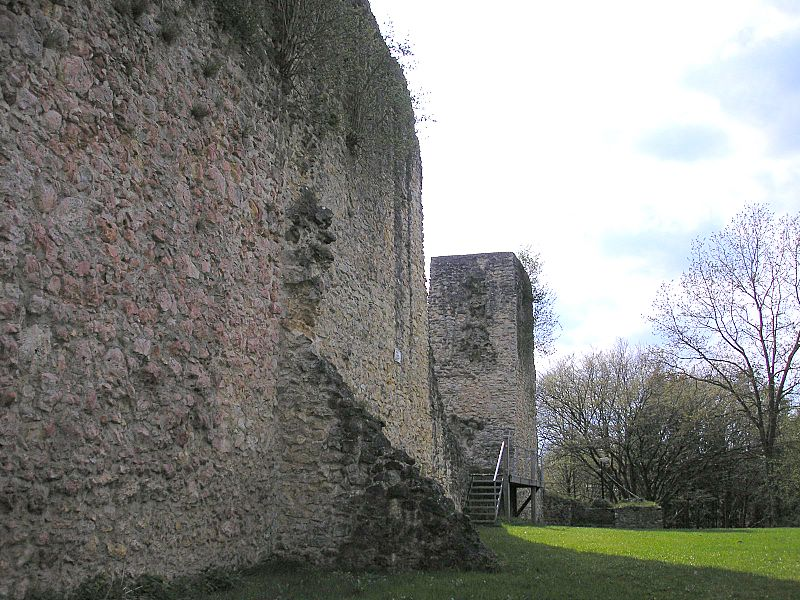
Inner side of the curtain wall ruins

Berg Güssenburg was the ancestral seat of the House of Güssenberg (German: von Güssenberg), which was later known (around the 15/16th century) as the Güß von Güssenberg. The family was quite large and eventually ruled over many castles and communities in the region, including Brenz an der Brenz, Haunsheim and Leipheim. Because of the numerous branches of the family the entire Güssenberg family was generally known under the name of Güssen. The family ruled as Ministerialis or unfree knight in the service of another noble. Initially the Ministerialis ruled a fief for a noble, but could not inherit the fief. However, by the 13th century the fiefs had become much more heritable. The Güssen served as ministerialis for the Diepoldinger and later the Hohenstaufen families.

The first mention of the Güssen is from 1 and 7 May 1171 when Diepold Gusse is listed as a witness on two documents issued by Emperor Frederick I. Heinrich von Güssenberg is mentioned in 1216 as a witness to the peace settlement between the monastery at Ellwangen and Kaisheim.

In 1328 the fief went to the Counts of Helfenstein but the Güssen seem to have held the Güssenburg. Around 1346 the keep was expanded and the curtain wall was built. About twenty years later, the Güssen von Güssenburg line died out and the castle was taken over by the Güssen von Haunsheim family. A few years later, in 1372 the Haunsheim line sold the Güssenburg to the Count of Helfenstein. The Güssenburg was the administrative center of the Count's fief in the Brenz valley.

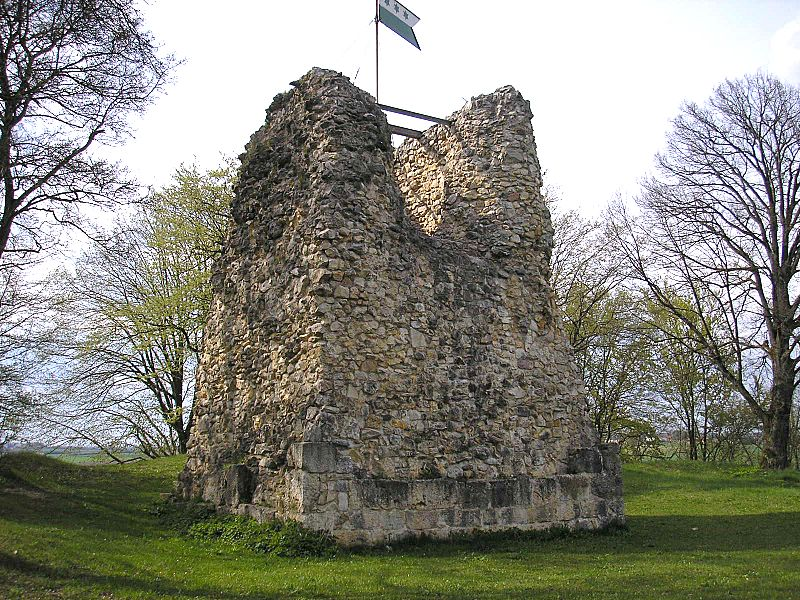
Ruins of the central keep

The count's vogt or bailiff was located at the Güssenburg until 1448. The central location of the castle made it an ideal location to administer the grafschaft or fief of the Count. In 1448 the fief fell to the House of Württemberg. However, the castle was destroyed in 1449 during the Städtekreig by troops from Ulm, Giengen and Lauingen, and never rebuilt.

In 1709 the community of Hermaringen inherited the ruins and the associated farms below the hill. In 1970/71 the ruins were repaired and cleaned. A further renovation occurred from 1981 until 1998 through the local Castle Society.

== Description ==
The keep and curtain wall form an irregular rectangle of about 45 m × 70 m (148 ft × 230 ft). On the south side, a wide dry moat separates the castle area from the flat hill top. Near the moat a massive curtain wall rises up, the Ashlar wall is up to 3.4 m (11 ft) thick. A post, found in the wall, has been dendrochronology dated to 1350.

The curtain wall is 47 m (154 ft) long, and the western portion is partially collapsed. On the ends there are short, angular sections of wall. The western, somewhat longer section, might be the remains of the former castle gate. The eastern section is the beginning of the inner wall.

About 25 m (82 ft) behind the curtain wall, currently nearly flat, runs the old inner ditch. Behind the inner ditch, portions of the inner castle still remain. These include debris, barriers and the ruins of the keep.

The square keep is still about 6 m (20 ft) high. During the early 20th century the outer layer of the keep was still visible. However, today only the brick fill of the walls is still visible. The inner surface (about 2 m × 2 m (6.6 ft × 6.6 ft)) is decorated with 26 small squares.

== See also ==
- List of castles in Baden-Württemberg
- Schloss Brenz
