= Alfred Jackson =

Alfred Jackson may refer to:

- Alfred E. Jackson (1807–1889), Confederate States Army brigadier general, American Civil War
- Alfred Jackson (wide receiver, born 1955), professional American football player
- Alfred Jackson (boxer) (1896–1980), British boxer at the 1928 Olympics
- Alfred Jackson (gridiron football, born 1967), professional American and Canadian football player
- Alfred Jackson (cricketer) (1904–1982), Argentinian and Chilean cricketer
- Alfred Jackson (Tennessee) (1812–1901), slave and tour guide
- Alfred Metcalf Jackson (1860–1924), American politician
- Alf Jackson (1887–1964), Australian rules footballer
- Alfie Jackson, musician in The Holloways
- Xavier Herbert (1901–1984), Australian writer born Alfred Jackson
- Alfred Jackson (rugby league), New Zealand rugby league footballer who played in the 1900s and 1910s
- Alfred Thomas Jackson (1864–1928), American educator
- Clem Jackson (Alfred Clement Jackson, 1886–1960), English professional footballer
