= Steinheim =

Steinheim may refer to:

== Places ==
- Steinheim, Westphalia, in the district of Höxter, North Rhine-Westphalia, Germany
- Steinheim an der Murr, in the district of Ludwigsburg, Baden-Württemberg, Germany
- Steinheim am Albuch, in the district of Heidenheim, Baden-Württemberg, Germany
- Steinheim (Hanau), the former Steinheim am Main, a district of Hanau, Hessen, Germany
- Steinheim, Luxembourg, a small town in the commune of Rosport, Luxembourg

=== Craters ===
- Steinheim crater, meteorite crater in Germany
- Steinheim (Martian crater), crater on Mars

== Surname ==
- Solomon Ludwig Steinheim (1789–1866), German Jewish philosopher

== See also ==
- 6563 Steinheim, main-belt asteroid
- Steinheim skull
