= Brenz Castle =

Castle in Germany

Coordinates: 48.5614°N 10.2929°E

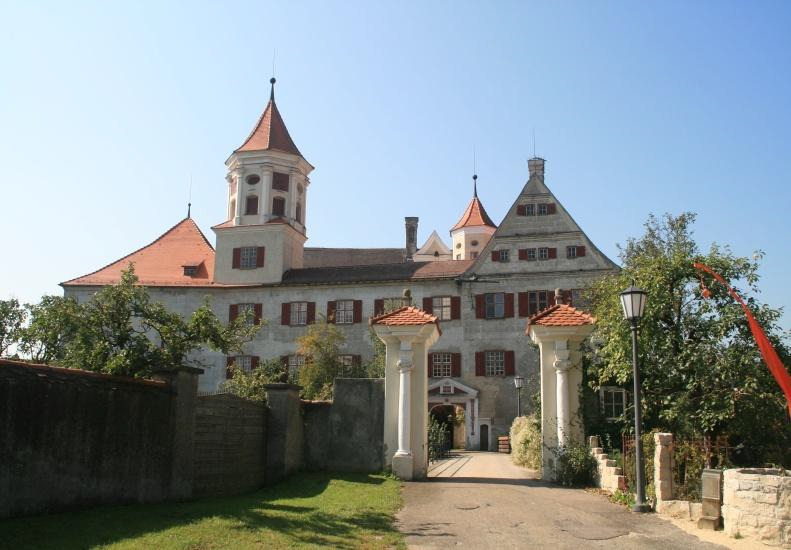
Brenz Castle

Brenz Castle is Renaissance castle located in the Brenz an der Brenz borough of Sontheim in Heidenheim district of Baden-Württemberg in Germany. The current castle was built in 1672 and rests on the remains of an earlier castle destroyed during the Thirty Years' War. Within the castle is a small Community Heritage Museum that is open on Sundays, Holidays or by appointment and hosts several concerts throughout the year.

== History ==
During the High Middle Ages ownership of Brenz an der Brenz rested with a minor noble family who took their name from the location. Members of this family are mentioned several times in the records from this time. In the Galluskirche there is a gravestone from 1190 for Sebolt von Brenz who is listed as a Crusader. After 1250 a side line of the noble family von Güssenberg (known as Güssen) occupied Schloss Brenz. To pay debts, the family quickly fell into highway robbery and the castle was destroyed under orders of Louis IV in 1340. However the castle was partly repaired soon afterward.

In 1546, during the Schmalkaldic War Charles V. stayed at the Schloss Brenz as a guest of the Güssen.

The Güssen family became too poor to support the castle, and in 1613 sold the entire village and castle to the Duchy of Württemberg. In 1617 Duke Julius Friedrich von Württemberg took the villages of Brenz and Weiltingen under his control, founding the junior Württemberg line of Württemberg-Weiltingen. Schloss Brenz was used as a temporary home for his family. However, the damaged castle was destroyed in 1634 during the Battle of Nördlingen of the Thirty Years' War. In 1672 Duke Friedrich Ferdinand had the castle rebuilt in a Renaissance style. The foundation of the old castle and some portions of the walls are still visible, but most of the castle was built new.

After the junior Württemberg-Weiltingen line died out, Brenz returned to the main line House of Württemberg. Duke Eberhard Ludwig gave the castle to his mistress Wilhelmine von Grävenitz in 1721. When she fell out of favor, she was forced to leave Württemberg and all her gifts behind. Schloss Brenz remained generally empty afterward, though a branch of the family von Racknitz lived in the castle for a short while.

In 1847 the community inherited the castle. It was used for by the city government and also as a school. In 1906 the oldest Community Heritage Museum in Württemberg was founded in the castle. The Baroque portal in the Knights hall (German: Rittersaal) was repainted in 1931 by Heinrich Eberhard. The building was renovated in 1972 and the regional Registrar as well as the community room for the local Protestant congregation were added.

== Museum ==
The museum is described as a geological, paleontological and community heritage museum. The museum was founded in 1906 on the initiative of the inhabitants of Brenz an der Brenz. The core of the museum is the collection of notable fossils from the Swabian Jura from professor Hans Wagner. The community heritage section contains earthenware and stoneware, pewter tableware and cast iron stove tops, costumes from the lower Brenztal (Brenz River Valley) as well as rural tools.

== See also ==
- List of castles in Baden-Württemberg
- Brenz an der Brenz
- Burg Güssenburg
