= ILG =

Ilg or ILG may refer to:

- Ilg, a surname
- ILG, Inc. an American timeshare company
- Ilgar language
- Independent Label Group
- International Ladies Garment Workers Union
- New Castle Airport, in Delaware, United States

== See also ==
- LLG (disambiguation)
