= Resch =

Resch is a surname of German origin. Notable people with the surname include:

- Alessandro Resch (1892–1966), Italian flying ace
- Alexander Resch (born 1979), German luger
- Anton Resch (1921–1975), German fighter ace
- Aurélie Resch, Canadian author and filmmaker
- Chico Resch (born 1948), Canadian ice hockey goaltender
- Clara Resch (born 1995), German politician
- Edmund Resch (1847–1923), Australian brewer
- Erwin Resch (born 1957), Austrian alpine skier
- Francis Xavier Resch (1878–1976), Austrian-born American bishop
- Franz Resch (born 1969), Austrian footballer
- Friedrich Resch (born 1944), Austrian equestrian
- Helmuth Resch (born 1933), Austrian fencer
- Jakob Resch, West German bobsledder
- Jami Resch (born 1973/1974), American police chief
- Jutta Resch-Treuwerth (1941-2015), German journalist
- Lisa Resch (1908–1949), German alpine skier
- Nicole Resch (born 1975), German jurist
- Nikolaus Resch (born 1984), Austrian sailor
- Poldl Resch (1900–1971), Austrian footballer
- Riitta Resch (born 1954), Finnish diplomat
- Ron Resch (1939–2009), American computer scientist and artist
- Thomas Resch (1460–1520), Austrian Renaissance humanist
- Tina Resch (born 1969), U.S. citizen claiming to have psychokinetic abilities
- Tony Resch, U.S. lacrosse player
