= Katzenstein Castle =

- Dischingen, Heidenheim in Germany
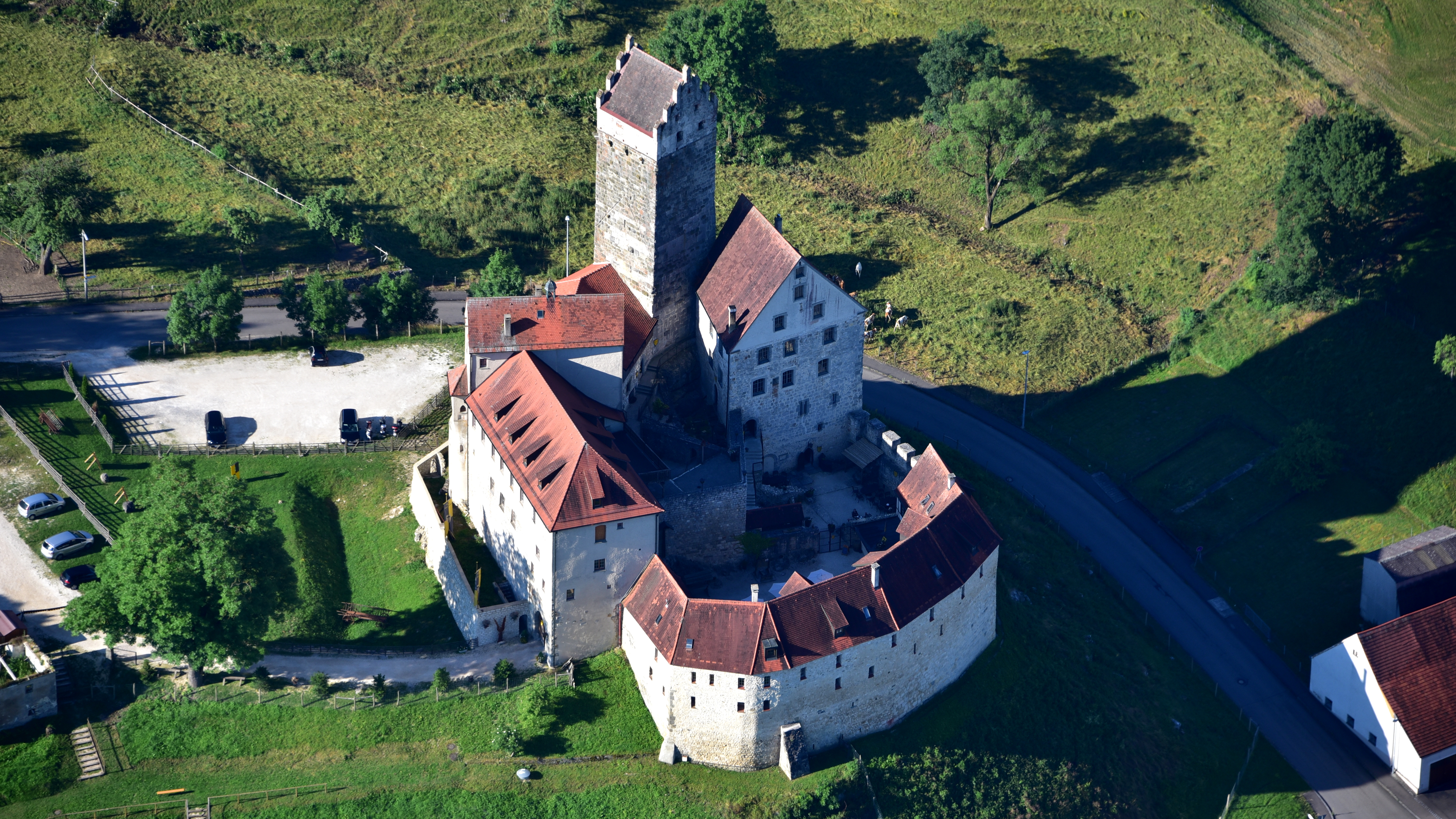
- Aerial view

Site information
- Open to the public: Yes
- Website: www.burgkatzenstein.de/en

Location
- Location in Baden-Württemberg Katzenstein Castle (Germany)
- Coordinates: 48°43′25″N 10°23′30″E

Site history
- Built: 11th Century
- Built by: House of Hohenstaufen
- In use: 1099-1939
- Materials: Stone
- Fate: Privately owned since 1939

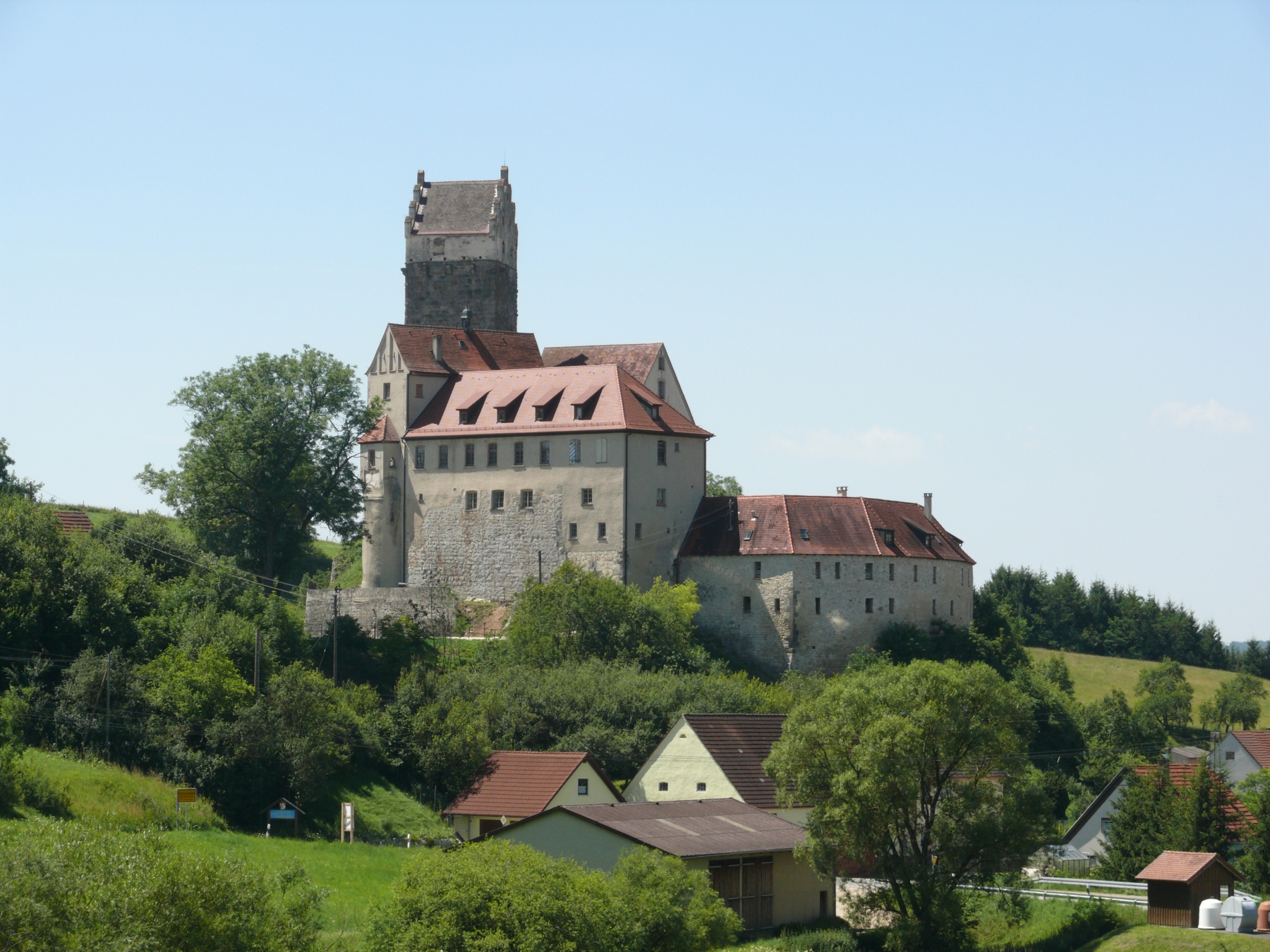
Burg Katzenstein on the hill above the village Katzenstein

Katzenstein Castle is one of the oldest remaining Hohenstaufen castles in Germany. It is located in a borough that shares its name with the castle in the Dischingen municipality of the Heidenheim district of Baden-Württemberg. The castle is open to visitors and contains several dining rooms as well as hotel rooms.

== Location ==
This hill castle is located in the valley of a tributary of the Egau river on the Härtsfeld in Heidenheim district near an old Roman road running from Faimingen in Lauingen to Bopfingen known as the Frankensträßle (English: Frankish avenue). Burg Katzenstein is located 538 metres (1,765 ft) above sea level.

== History ==
In 1099, the Lords von Cassenstein were first mentioned. The family was a ministerial or unfree knightly family in the service of the Graf (or Count) von Dillingen. In 1262, Edlen von Hürnheim was listed as the owner of the castle von Katzenstein when it was sold by Hermann von Hürnheim-Katzenstein.

Ownership changed again in 1354 when the Graf von Oettingen acquired the castle. He quickly pawned the castle on the Graf von Helfenstein, who gave the castle to Berthold von Westerstetten in 1382. In 1572, the Katzenstein line wiped out the Westerstetten line. The inheritance of the Westerstetten family was sold again to the von Oettingen family.

The castle was burned to the ground by French soldiers in 1648, at the end of the Thirty Years' War. The castle was rebuilt in 1669.

Burg Katzenstein went to the Oettingen-Wallenstein line in 1798. Later, in 1810, the castle was taken over by the state of Württemberg and placed under the district of Neresheim.

Since 1939, the castle has been privately owned.

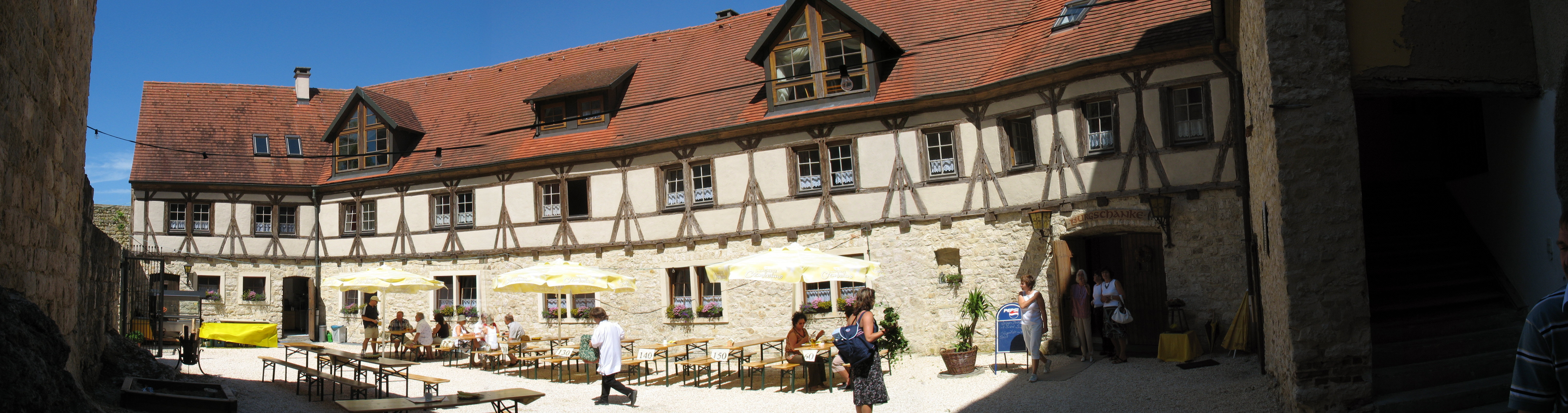
The inner courtyard of Burg Katzenstein

== Sights ==
In 1973, the St Laurentius chapel was opened and cleaning began. Under the dirt and partially completed Baroque paintings, impressive Mediaeval paintings were discovered. The fresco paintings date from 1250 to 1280 and show the transition from Romanesque art to early Gothic art.

== See also ==
- List of castles in Baden-Württemberg
