= Southern Normal University =

School in Carroll County, Tennessee, US

Coordinates: 36.0210°N 88.4097°W

Huntingdon Southern Normal University was in Huntingdon, Tennessee in Carroll County, Tennessee. It was chartered in August 1890 and opened in 1891. It was purchased by J. H. Bayer in 1908 for an Industrial and Training School. It closed in 1918. The Huntingdon Special School District was established on the site of the Southern Normal University in 1919.

J. A. Baber served as president. A. L. Peterman was a professor at the school before returning to Kentucky in 1898. Dr. Halbrook also worked at the school.

In 1900, white teachers of the Carroll County Teachers' Institute met at its auditorium for three days. "Colored" teachers met at a public school.

Southern Normal University College of Law offered an L.L.B. degree under Edwin Maxey.

== Alumni ==
- Edgar L. McHaney, state legislator and justice of the Arkansas Supreme Court
- Alfred Thomas Jackson, educator who founded Sumner-Robertson Normal College in Tennessee
- Andrew J. May, politician and public official
- Francis Xavier Resch
- June C. Smith
- T. S. Stribling
