= Heidenheim an der Brenz =

Heidenheim an der Brenz Hoidna / Hoirna (Swabian)
- Town
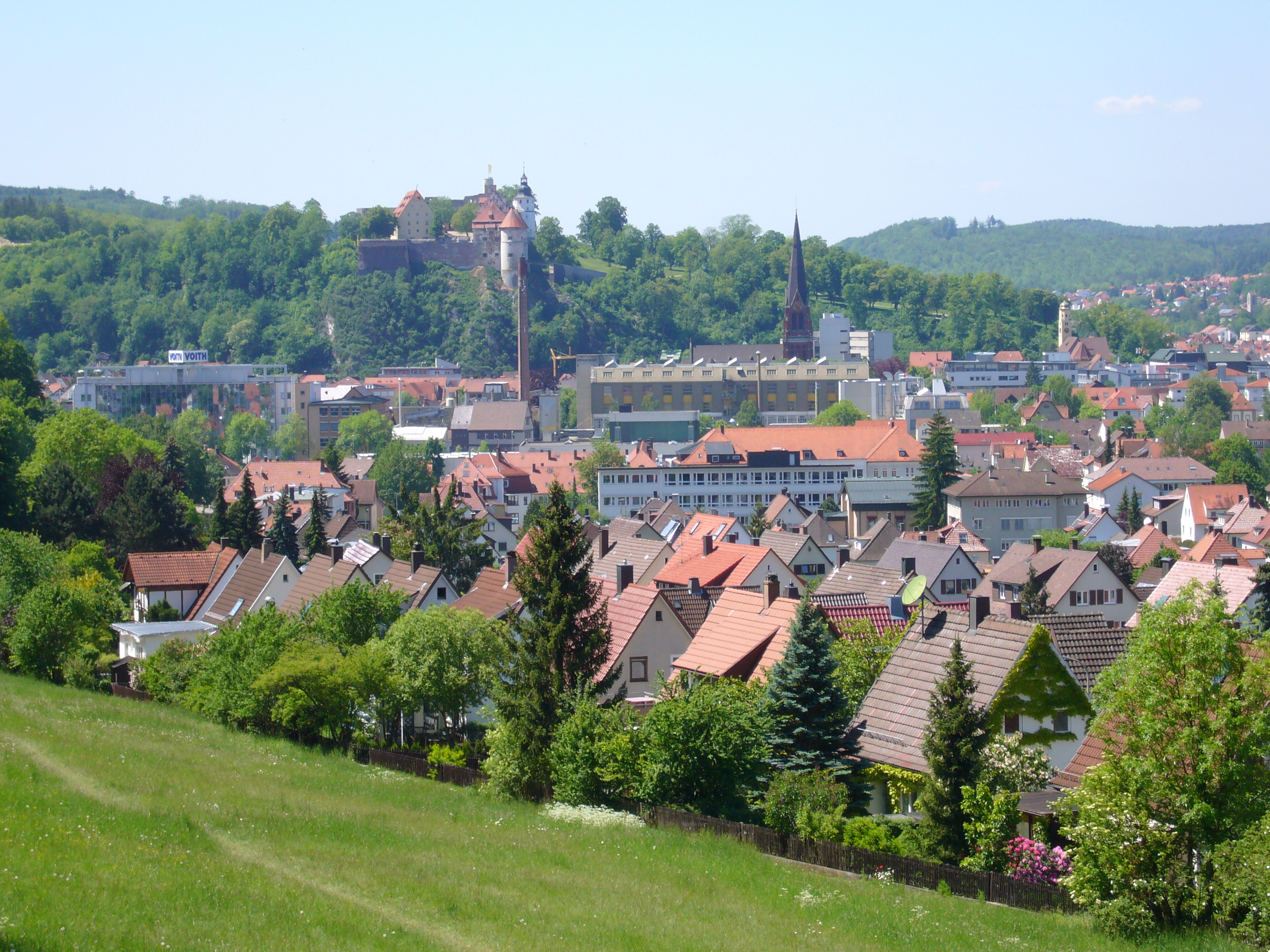

- Coat of arms

- Location of Heidenheim an der Brenz within Heidenheim district
- Interactive map of Heidenheim an der Brenz
- Location within Germany Location within Baden-Württemberg
- Coordinates: 48°40′34″N 10°09′16″E
- Country: Germany
- State: Baden-Württemberg
- Admin. region: Stuttgart
- District: Heidenheim

Government
  - Mayor (2021–29): Michael Salomo (SPD)

Area
  - Total: 107.09 km^{2} (41.35 sq mi)
- Elevation: 504 m (1,654 ft)

Population (2025-12-31)
  - Total: 50,612
  - Density: 472.61/km^{2} (1,224.1/sq mi)
- Time zone: UTC+01:00 (CET)
  - Summer (DST): UTC+02:00 (CEST)
- Postal codes: 89501–89522
- Dialling codes: 07321
- Vehicle registration: HDH
- Website: www.heidenheim.de

Heidenheim an der Brenz (German pronunciation: [ˈhaɪdn̩haɪm ʔan deːɐ̯ ˈbʁɛnts], lit. 'Heidenheim on the Brenz'), usually shortened to Heidenheim (German pronunciation: [ˈhaɪdn̩haɪm]; Swabian: Hoidna or Hoirna), is a town in Baden-Württemberg in southern Germany. It is located near the border with Bavaria, approximately 17 km south of Aalen and 33 km north of Ulm. Heidenheim is the largest town and the seat of the district of Heidenheim, and ranks third behind Aalen and Schwäbisch Gmünd in size among the towns in the region of East Württemberg. Heidenheim is the economic center for all the communities in Heidenheim district and is the headquarters of the Voith industrial company. The town's population in 2021 was just below the 50,000 mark. Heidenheim collaborates with the town of Nattheim in administrative matters.

The residents of Heidenheim and its surrounding area speak the distinct German dialect of Swabian.

== Geography ==
Heidenheim is situated between Albuch and the Härtsfeld region in the northeast corner of the Swabian Alb where the valley of the Brenz meets the Stubental at the foot of Hellenstein Mountain. The source of the Brenz is located in Königsbronn and enters Heidenheim from the northwest. It runs through the boroughs of Aufhausen and Schnaitheim before it gets to Heidenheim (proper). From there it continues on to the south through the borough of Mergelstetten, before it leaves the city limits to head for Herbrechtingen.

=== Neighbouring municipalities ===
Heidenheim shares borders with the following cities and towns, listed clockwise starting from the North: Aalen and Neresheim (both in Ostalb County), Nattheim (Heidenheim County), Syrgenstein (Dillingen County, Bavaria), as well as Herbrechtingen, Steinheim am Albuch and Königsbronn (all in Heidenheim County).

=== Subdivisions ===
Heidenheim an der Brenz consists of Heidenheim (proper) and the subdivisions (boroughs) of Schnaitheim, Mergelstetten, Oggenhausen and Großkuchen (annexed between 1910 and 1974).

Each of the four boroughs includes their own neighbourhoods that either have a long history of their own or were created as new developments. But while these neighbourhoods received their names during construction, their boundaries have not been officially defined.

Oggenhausen and Großkuchen became part of Heidenheim during the last district reform in the 1970s and are also municipalities under state administrative law. This designation entitles them to a borough council, elected by registered voters in municipal elections. The Municipal Council is headed by a president.

==== Schnaitheim ====
Schnaitheim, to the north, was at one time a politically independent small town but is now Heidenheim's largest borough, officially known as Heidenheim-Schnaitheim. Expansion of both towns has now eradicated any geographical separation between the two. Although largely residential, Schnaitheim is home to a number of Heidenheim's "Big Box"-style retailers, and its commercial districts are an important part of the city's infrastructure. It has about 10,900 residents.

Within Schnaitheim, neighbourhoods include Wehrenfeld on the east side, which consists largely of wealthier homes as well as a large recreational area featuring the town's largest sports club, TSG Schnaitheim. Other neighbourhoods include Hagen on the west side, located on the slope of a hill and Aufhausen, once a separate farming village to the north but now amalgamated.

==== Mergelstetten ====
Mergelstetten is located to the south of Heidenheim center, as it heads towards Herbrechtingen. With about 7900 residents, Mergelstetten is home to a number of factories, but retains a rural feel. Within Mergelstetten, the residential area of Reutenen sits elevated on a hill.

==== Oggenhausen ====
About 5 kilometers to the east of Heidenheim, separated by the major road European route E43, the village of Oggenhausen is home to about 1550 residents. The town voted to merge into Heidenheim by popular vote in 1970.

==== Großkuchen ====
About 8 kilometres north-east of Heidenheim, the geographically separate Großkuchen is a popular recreational area with hiking trails and cross-country skiing. It is also home to a small-scale local charcoal industry. The town has about 1550 residents and merged politically with Heidenheim in 1974.

=== Climate ===
Climate data for Heidenheim an der Brenz (1991-2020)
Month	Jan	Feb	Mar	Apr	May	Jun	Jul	Aug	Sep	Oct	Nov	Dec	Year
Daily mean °C (°F)	−0.6 (30.9)	0.0 (32.0)	3.8 (38.8)	8.3 (46.9)	12.8 (55.0)	16.2 (61.2)	17.7 (63.9)	17.2 (63.0)	12.7 (54.9)	8.4 (47.1)	3.5 (38.3)	0.4 (32.7)	8.4 (47.1)
Average precipitation mm (inches)	69.6 (2.74)	55.9 (2.20)	65.3 (2.57)	50.1 (1.97)	79.5 (3.13)	80.9 (3.19)	89.8 (3.54)	81.0 (3.19)	57.1 (2.25)	64.3 (2.53)	65.1 (2.56)	78.0 (3.07)	836.6 (32.94)
Mean monthly sunshine hours	46	71.4	121.4	170.3	200.4	215.6	232.9	212.6	148.1	91.5	45.6	39.1	1,594.9
Source: Deutscher Wetterdienst

== History ==
There is evidence that human life existed within the city limits of Heidenheim as far back as 8,000 years ago. However, a permanent settlement was not established until approximately 1300 BC. Extensive ruins remain of settlements dating, predominantly, to the period from 1200 to 800 BC.

At the time of the Roman Empire from about 85 AD onwards, Heidenheim was the location of Castle Aquileia with attached cavalry of more than 1,000 mounted soldiers. The unit, called ala II flavia milliaria was later, around 159 AD, moved further North to Aalen. At first, the castle marked the Eastern end of the Alb Limes. But it did not take long until a civilian settlement was founded at this strategically important spot, marked by the intersection of five Roman roads. This settlement was the largest Roman city in what is today Baden-Württemberg and archeological finds suggest that it covered an area of approximately 37 - 50 acres (15 - 20 hectares). More recently, excavations have found the remains of a representative Roman administrative building. Its exact function was not fully understood as of May 2005, but given Aquileia's size, location and other indicators, it is believed that it was probably the capital of a Roman administrative district (see also Civitas). From 233 on, the Alamanni repeatedly attacked the Roman limes fortifications. The Roman surrender of the limes in 260 spelled the end of the Roman city of Heidenheim. It is not clear to what extent Romans stayed on under the new Alamannic rule but it is very likely that some remained.

Nothing is known about Aquileia/Heidenheim during the period of the Great Migration. However, in the 8th century Heidenheim was mentioned (again) for the first time in official documents. The creation of the city in the Middle Ages went hand in hand with the construction of Hellenstein Castle. The city wall was built in segments in 1190 and 1420 and Emperor Charles IV granted or confirmed the city's status as a market town in 1356. Through the rule of the von Helfenstein family, the city became part of the Duchy of Teck, ruled by Württemberg, in 1448. It temporarily belonged to the dukes of Bavaria between 1462 and 1504. Later still, albeit for only a short period, the city belonged to Ulm. During Württemberg times, it was always the seat of an administrative unit. This unit was an exclave of the dukes of Württemberg until 1803 when Württemberg's territorial gains connected the city with the main part of the duchy's territory. In 1807 Heidenheim was promoted to district status and then again to County status in 1938. The district reform of the 1970s did not change the county limits by much.

The economic development of the village and city is founded mainly on the area's ore deposits that were already being exploited in Roman times. However, the importance of this branch of the city's economy diminished near the turn of the 19th century due to great competition, first from Wasseralfingen and later from the Rhineland.

Heidenheim also played an important part in the textile industry. Flax grown in the Eastern Swabian Alps was used to manufacture linen. The business grew into an industry at the dawn of the 19th century with the help of cotton imports but declined after World War II due to international competition. During the war, a subcamp of the Dachau concentration camp was located here. It provided slave labour to local industry.

After World War II ended in 1945, a displaced persons camp was established in the city to help relocate Jewish displaced persons. The camp, housing at times up to 2,300 individuals, was dissolved in August 1949.

Mergelstetten was first mentioned in an official document by Bishop Walter von Augsburg in 1143 in which he confirmed that the nearby Cloister of Anhausen owned a mill, a fish pond and a farm. However, it is estimated that the first settlement was founded in the 7th or 8th century by the Alamanni. Other important dates for the local economy are 1828 when Jakob Zoeppritz from Darmstadt founded a woolen blanket factory and 1901 when Carl Schwenk of Ulm built the concrete factory.

== Religion ==
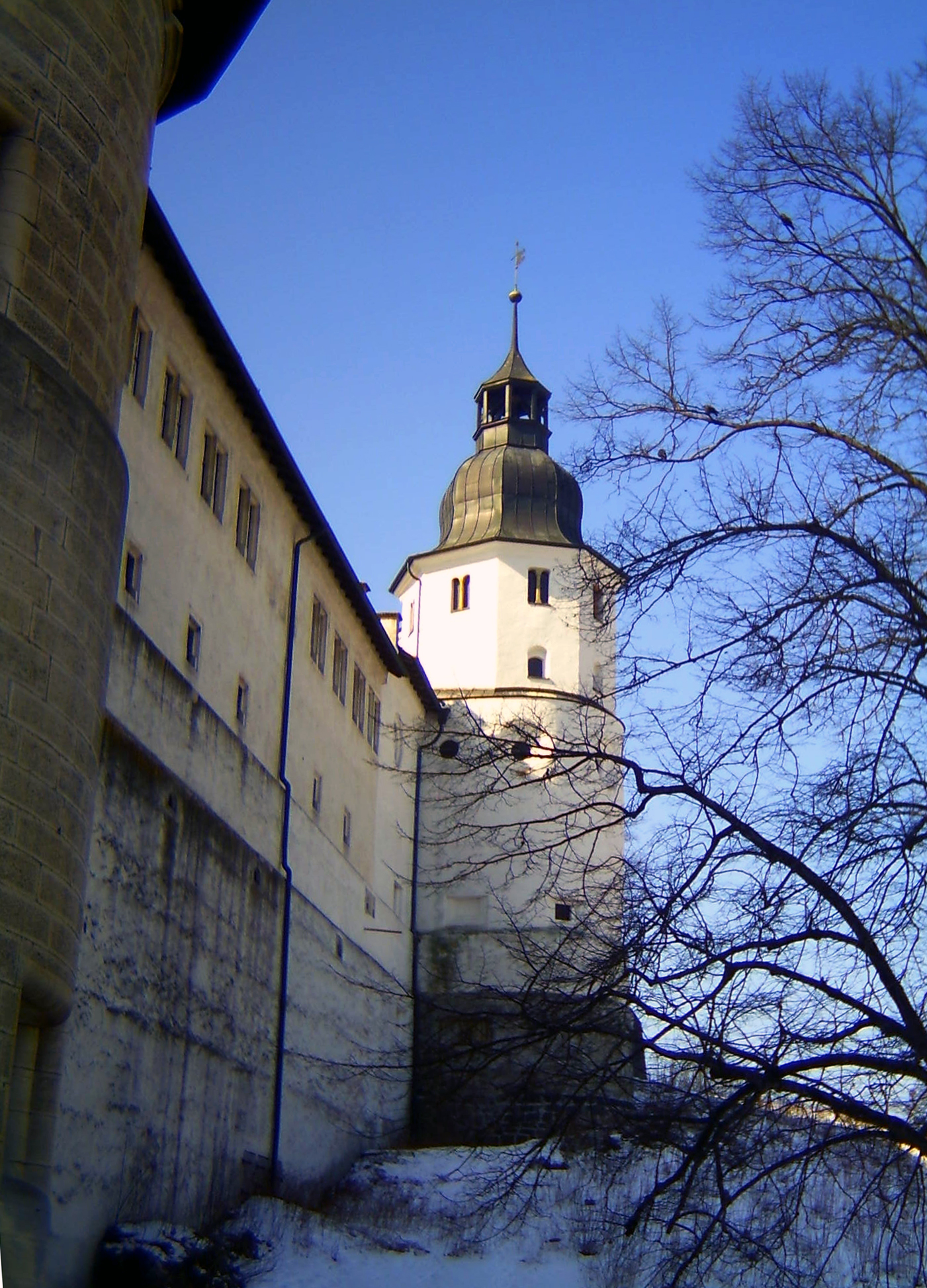
Schloss Hellenstein in winter

Heidenheim's residents originally belonged to the Prince-Bishopric of Augsburg from where they were assigned to the Heidenheim Chapter. However, in 1524 the Reformation burst into the city via Ulm.

At the time Heidenheim was part of Württemberg and Duke Ulrich championed the Reformation from 1535 on. Residents of city have adhered over the centuries primarily to the Protestant faith.

In those days, Heidenheim became the seat of a Deacony, its church being located on the site where Paul's Protestant Church (built in 1897) currently stands. But Heidenheim's first parish church was Peter's Church at the top of the Totenberg. Originally a Roman church, it was remodeled several times and now serves as the chapel for the cemetery. During the 16th century, Michael's Church became the seat of the Heidenheim parish. This church was built ca. 1200, completely rebuilt in 1578, and expanded in 1621. The tower was erected in 1687, and the extension was added to again in 1767. With the construction of Paul's Church the seat of the deaconry moved there; however, Michael's Church remains a church of Paul's Parish to this day.

In the meantime, Heidenheim's population continued to grow. During the 20th century, several additional parishes were founded: Christ Parish was founded in 1958 (its church built in 1956), John's Parish with church and community center in 1963, Forestchurch Parish in 1972 (its church was built in 1975 but the community had had the use of a wooden chapel built in 1926), as well as Reconciliation Parish and Zinzendorf Parish.

These six parishes located in Heidenheim (proper) form the Protestant United Parish of Heidenheim. As they too belonged to Württemberg, the boroughs of Mergelstetten and Schnaitheim also converted to Protestantism early on. As a result, independent Protestant parishes and churches exist in both boroughs.

Mergelstetten was at first a branch of Bolheim, but became its own parish in 1700. Today's church was built in 1843 to replace one that had burnt to the ground two years earlier.

The church of Schnaitheim was constructed in the 17th century, although the town already had a church (first mentioned in 1344).

Oggenhausen at first belonged to the parish of Zöschingen and remained Catholic. But during the 17th century here too Protestantism won out. Later the town became part of the parish of Nattheim until it became a parish in its own right in 1834. The village church was built in 1702 to replace an earlier chapel. Großkuchen remained Catholic because ecumenically it belonged to Öttingen and because the Benedictine Abbey at Neresheim owned the right to use the village church. The few Protestants who by now have moved in are attached to the parish in Schnaitheim. All Protestant parishes within city limits belong to the Deanony of Heidenheim within the Evangelical-Lutheran Church in Württemberg. Finally, pietist parishes are also represented in Heidenheim.

Catholics only reemerged in Heidenheim during the 19th century. In 1882 they got their own church when the Church of St. Mary was built. The corresponding parish was founded in 1886.

A second church, Trinity Church, was built in 1961 and became a parish in 1962. Mergelstetten got Christ the King Church in 1957, which was later elevated to a parish in 1961. These three parishes form what is today Ministry 3 of the Deacony Heidenheim within the Diocese of Rottenburg-Stuttgart.

In Schnaitheim, St. Boniface Church was built in 1951 (parish in 1961). The Church of Saint Peter and Paul in Großkuchen had been built back in 1736 on the foundation of an older church. Part of the parish is also Kleinkuchen but it has its own church of Saint Ulrich (built in 1517 and then rebuilt in 1746). Both parishes (St Boniface and St. Peter and Paul) together with the neighbouring parish of Mary's Ascension in Königsbronn form the Ministry 2.

Catholics from Oggenhausen belong to the Holy Heart of Jesus parish in Nattheim (Ministry 1), also part of the Deacony of Heidenheim.

In addition to the two larger denominations, residents have the choice of independent churches and parishes such as the Methodist Church, The Evangelical Immanuel Parish, the Evangelical Chrischona-Community and others. The New Apostolic Church and The Christian Community are also represented in Heidenheim.

== Demographics ==
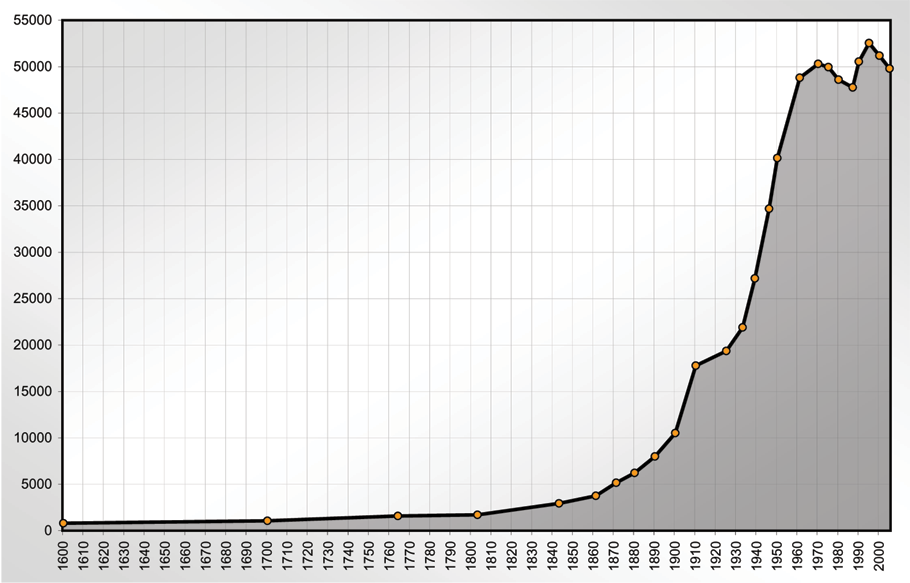
Heidenheim an der Brenz demographics

Figures reflect city limits at the time and are estimates or Census data (^{1}), or official extensions thereof, counting only primary residences.

Year	Population
1600	approx. 800
1700	1,055
1764	1,576
1803	1,711
1843	2,941
1861	3,762
December 1, 1871	5,167
December 1, 1880 ^{1}	6,229
December 1, 1890 ^{1}	8,001

Year	Population
1900 ^{1}	10,510
1910 ^{1}	17,780
1925 ^{1}	19,363
1933 ^{1}	21,903
1939 ^{1}	27,178
1946	34,694
1950 ^{1}	40,142
1961 ^{1}	48,792
1970	50,292

Year	Population
1975	49,943
1980	48,585
1987 ^{1}	47,753
1990	50,532
1995	52,527
2000	51,181
2005	49,784
2007	49,092

^{1} Census data

== Government ==
In connection with the district reform in the 1970s, municipal laws of Baden-Württemberg were amended to introduce borough councils for certain boroughs. Residents of such boroughs elect their borough council at each municipal election and the council must be consulted on all matters of significance to the borough. The president also presides over the city council.

=== City council ===
Since the last municipal elections in 2019, the city council of Heidenheim has consisted of 33 (previously 34) members, each serving a term of five years. They belong to the following political parties:

Party	%	Seats
Bündnis 90/Green Party	23.6%	8
CDU	22.7%	7
SPD	20.1%	7
Free Voters	21.2%	7
Die Linke	5.8%	2
DKP	2.3%	1
FDP	3.1%	1
AfD	1.1%	0

=== Mayor ===
In the age when Heidenheim an der Brenz belonged to Württemberg a noble advocate presided over the court and the city. Somewhat later, a head advocate and then an Executor of the Duke led the court. From 1802 on, there were two mayors and 12 councilmen. In 1819 the City Executor stood at the helm of the city, assisted by a city council starting in 1822. Since 1907 the city's leaders have been known by the title of Mayor. Today's mayors are elected to office by direct vote for a term of 8 years. The mayor serves also as City Council President and their permanent Deputy is the First Councilperson.

Mayors of Heidenheim an der Brenz since 1819

Term	Mayor
1819–1833	Georg Jakob Heinrich Mack
1833–1859	Gottfried Völter
1859–1866	Friedrich Winter
1866–1867	Friedrich Wehrle
1867–1877	Carl Greiner
1877	Carl Bunz, Executor
1877–1878	Louis Junginger
1878–1902	Christian Friedrich Schlagentweith
1902–1903	Wilhelm Lösch
1903–1935	Eugen Jaekle
1935	Gustav Müller

Term	Mayor
1935–1945	Rudolf Meier
1945	Paul Schwaderer
1945–1946	Werner Plappert
1946–1948	Werner Kliefoth
1948–1956	Karl Rau
1956–1957	Ernst Langensee, Executor
1957–1969	Elmar Doch
1969–1993	Martin Hornung
1993–2000	Helmut Himmelsbach
2000–2021	Bernhard Ilg
2021–present	Michael Salomo

=== Coat of arms ===
The coat of arms of the city of Heidenheim an der Brenz features a bearded "heathen" wearing a red cap with a blue rim and a red shirt with a blue collar on golden background. The city colors are red and blue.

Already in the 15th century the earliest known seal of the city displayed the canting heathen (= Heide in German). The colored version has been documented since the 16th century.

== Music ==
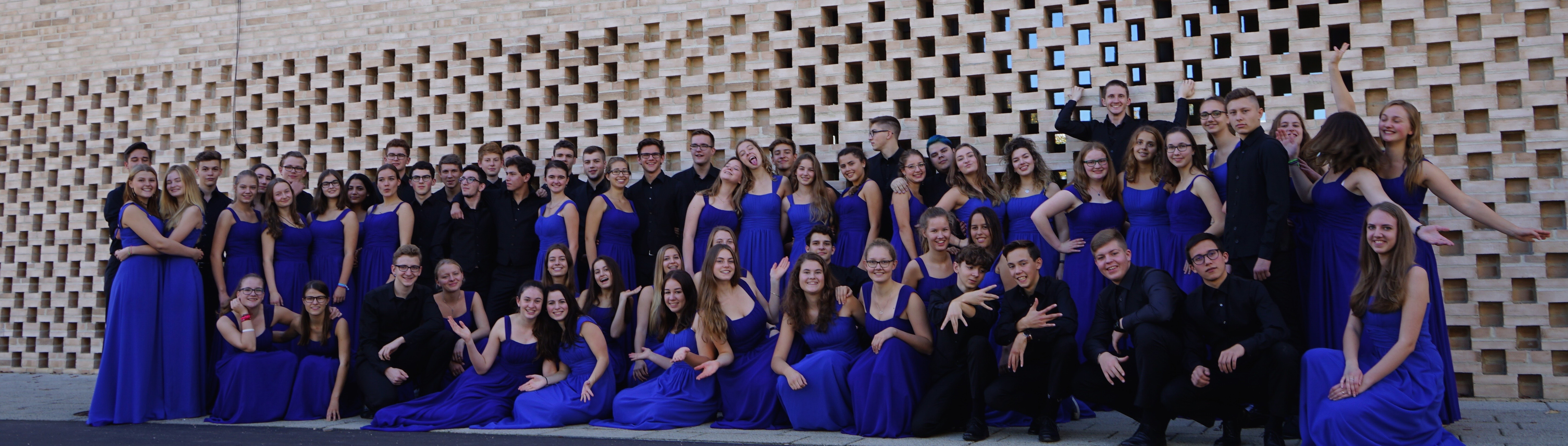
Neuer Kammerchor Heidenheim 2017

Heidenheim is the home of the Neuer Kammerchor Heidenheim, one of the most accomplished youth choirs in Germany, founded in 2005 by Thomas Kammel and under his direction since then. The Neuer Kammerchor tours overseas extensively and has won widespread critical acclaim for its performances. In January 2017 the choir was given the Bürger-Prize of the City of Heidenheim for his accomplishments as a cultural ambassador.

== People, culture, and architecture ==
Schnaitheim is home to the Sasse Theater company.

The State Museum of Württemberg ("Württembergisches Landesmuseum") operates a branch location in Hellenstein Castle where it has its Carriage and Chaise Museum. The Museum in the Roman Baths exhibits finds dating back to the Roman era. The Art Museum, located in a former Jugendstil bath, organizes traveling exhibits. It also displays a permanent exhibit of the world's largest and most complete collection of Picasso posters.

Located on top of Hellenstein Mountain and overlooking the city, Hellenstein Castle is the most important building and landmark in Heidenheim.

Notable structures in the inner city are the Protestant Michaels' Church (the former parish seat of the city), the Elmar-Doch-House, the Crown Inn and Pub, the Lower Gate, Villa Waldemaier, the burgher tower Türmle, the Castle Pharmacy, the weavers' settlement, the Heathland smithy, the Old mint and the old Peters' Church (today cemetery chapel).

The construction facility for the manufacture of large turbines built for the local Voith company in 1924 is a significant industrial historic landmark.

The little castle in Schnaitheim is situated at the Brenz river's edge and offers a sight to see for visitors and residents alike. The Schnaitheim Mill is located just a few hundred yards away with its large wheel, though operation of the mill was halted several years ago.

In Mergelstetten the old church was torn down in 1841 and replaced with a new Protestant church built in neo-gothic style. The building was commissioned by Carl Alexander Heideloff, who also commissioned Lichtenstein Castle. Lumber was used to build parts of the church because the parish was poor at the time. For the same reason, the church tower was not built as tall as originally planned. Nonetheless, this church is popular and picturesque and frequently used on postcards.

=== Events ===
Every other year the Shepherd Run takes place in Heidenheim, first held in 1723 by Duke Eberhard Ludwig. It attracts all the shepherds in the area. Part of the Shepherd Run festivities is the crowning of a new shepherd king and queen. The Run was held until 1828. Thereafter followed a long break until 1922, when it was held again (five times until 1952). Since its return in 1972, it has once again been an integral part of Heidenheim's regular cultural program.

In 2006 Heidenheim hosted the bi-annual Baden-Württemberg State Botanical Show.

Heidenheim hosts an annual World Cup fencing tournament in épée. Because of the size and depth of the field, the Heidenheim event is considered the strongest épée event in the world, stronger even than the World Championships or the Olympic Games.

=== Opera Festival ===
Every year, Heidenheim puts on the Opera Festival "Opernfestspiele Heidenheim" in Hellenstein Castle. The festival developed out of the former serenades held there. In recent years it has received international recognition and critical acclaim under the artistic direction of conductor Marco-Maria Canonica. In the summer of 2009 the Festival staged Marschner's opera "Der Vampyr", which was the second part of a cycle of three operas under the motto "Romantik im Rittersaal". The first part was von Weber's "Der Freischütz", performed in 2008, and the third and final installment was Wagner's "Der fliegende Holländer" in 2010. During the summer of 2010 all three operas were performed in full cycles. The Opernfestspiele Heidenheim draws visitors from around Europe and overseas, and has significantly boosted the city's reputation as an important cultural site. Residents also enjoy the annual theater festival in the outdoor Nature Theater.

== Sport ==
The city's main sport club is Heidenheimer Sportbund (SB), which offers a number of different sports. Its football division is led by FC Heidenheim 1846, which plays at the Voith-Arena. The team has experienced success in recent years, rising two tiers in the German football league system after winning the Regionalliga Süd in 2009. From the 2023–24 season, it will compete in the Bundesliga.

Heidenheimer SB's baseball division, Heidenheim Heideköpfe, plays in the first division of the Baseball Bundesliga. The club has made the playoffs in almost every year since it reached the first division in 2001, and won the championship in 2009.

== Economy and industry ==
=== Industry ===
In economic terms, Heidenheim's main claim to fame is being the headquarters of Voith, an industrial company specializing in turbines and machinery for the paper-making industry. Voith is Heidenheim's largest employer and employs 7,500 people in and around the town.

In May 2006, the world's first Paper Technology Centre was opened in Heidenheim at the cost of 75 million euros. Voith bills the centre as "the most important center for paper research in the world".

=== Transport ===
Heidenheim is a stop along the Brenz Railway that runs from Aalen via Heidenheim to Ulm. The regional train line is also part of Heidenheim's local public transport system. The town has a second train station on this line at the suburb of Schnaitheim.

Several bus lines also serve residents and visitors inside city limits.

Heidenheim is located near the Autobahn A 7 just off the Exit Heidenheim and is also easily accessible by car and truck via the federal highways B 19 and B 466 that traverse the city.

=== Media ===
"Heidenheimer Zeitung" and "Heidenheimer Neue Presse" are daily newspapers published in the city. In addition, the "Neue Woche" is published weekly (Thursday), as is the "Sunday Newspaper" (Sunday).

The Südwestrundfunk (SWR) operates a relay station for four of its FM stations and the television channel Das Erste. The Schmittenberg radio tower emits programs for two more radio stations.

== Notable people ==
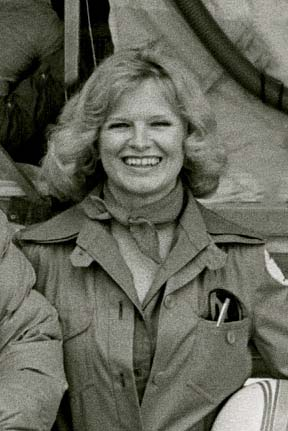
Vera Simons, 1976

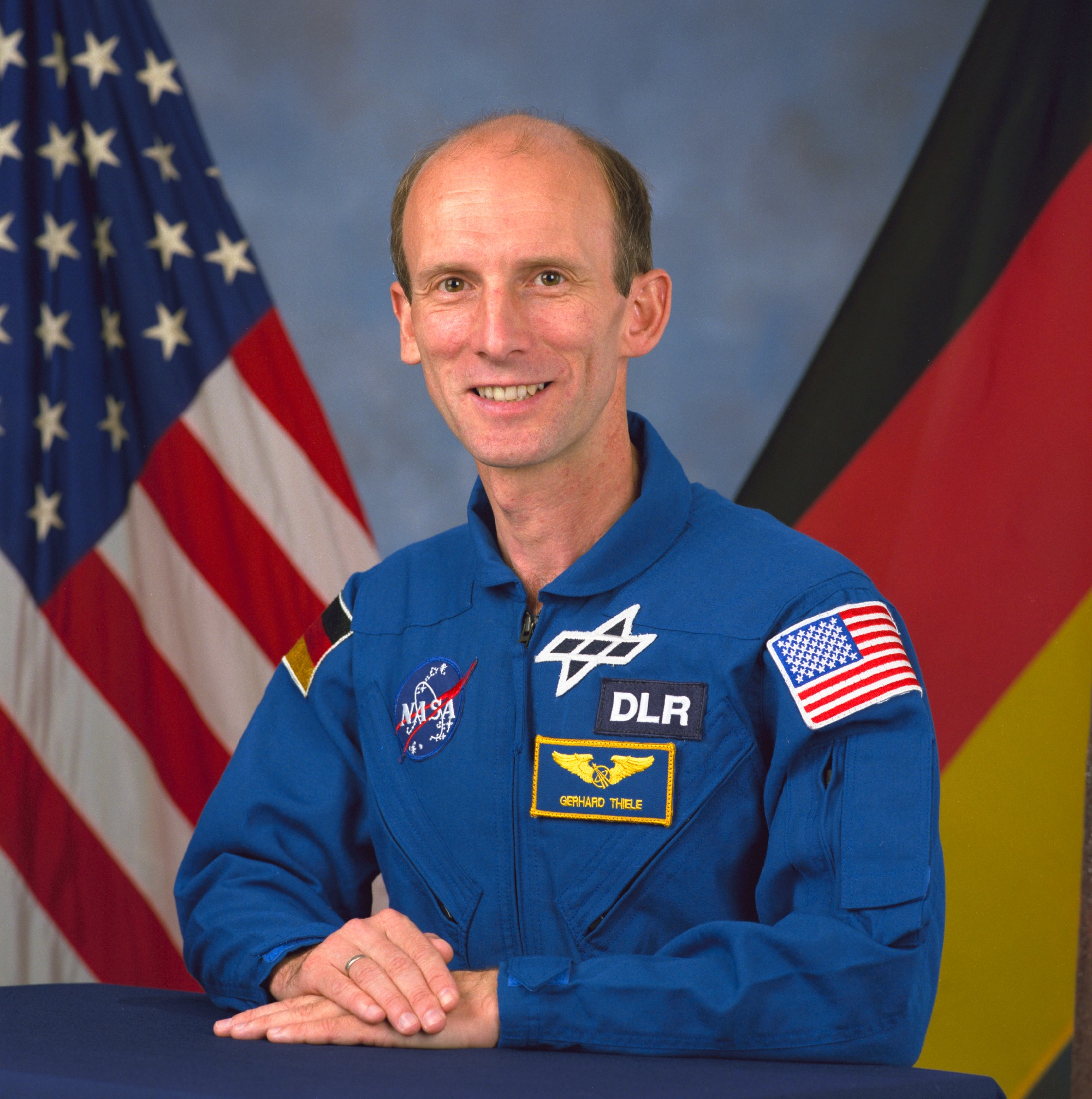
Gerhard Thiele, 2005

- Friedrich Christoph Oetinger (1702–1782), Lutheran theologian, worked in Heidenheim 1743–1746.
- Johann Jakob von Wunsch (1717–1788), Prussian General of the Infantry
- Countess Caroline Felizitas of Leiningen-Dagsburg (1734–1810), an Imperial countess.
- Alfred Meebold (1863–1952), botanist, writer and anthroposophist
- Erwin Rommel (1891–1944), German Field Marshal, an officer in World War I and II, father of Manfred Rommel
- Helmut Bornefeld (1906–1990), church musician, composer, organist and writer, worked locally from 1937
- Kurt Bittel (1907-1991, prehistorian and president of the German Archaeological Institute
- Dieter Oesterlen (1911–1994), architect in Hannover
- Vera Simons (1920–2012), inventor, artist, and balloonist.
- Walter Kasper (born 1933), Roman Catholic Cardinal
- Gerhard Thiele (born 1953), physicist and former astronaut

=== Sport ===
- Horst Blankenburg (born 1947), footballer who won the European Cup with Ajax three times in a row
- Ufuk Budak (born 1990), footballer, played over 270 games and 17 for Azerbaijan

== Twin towns – sister cities ==
Heidenheim an der Brenz is twinned with:

- Clichy, France (1958)
- Sankt Pölten, Austria (1968)
- Newport, United Kingdom (1981)
- Sisak, Croatia (1988)
- Döbeln, Germany (1991)
- Jihlava, Czech Republic (2002)

=== Friendly cities ===
Heidenheim an der Brenz also has friendly relations with:

- Qianjiang, China (1994)
- Papeete, French Polynesia, France (2022)
