= Herbrechtingen =

- Town
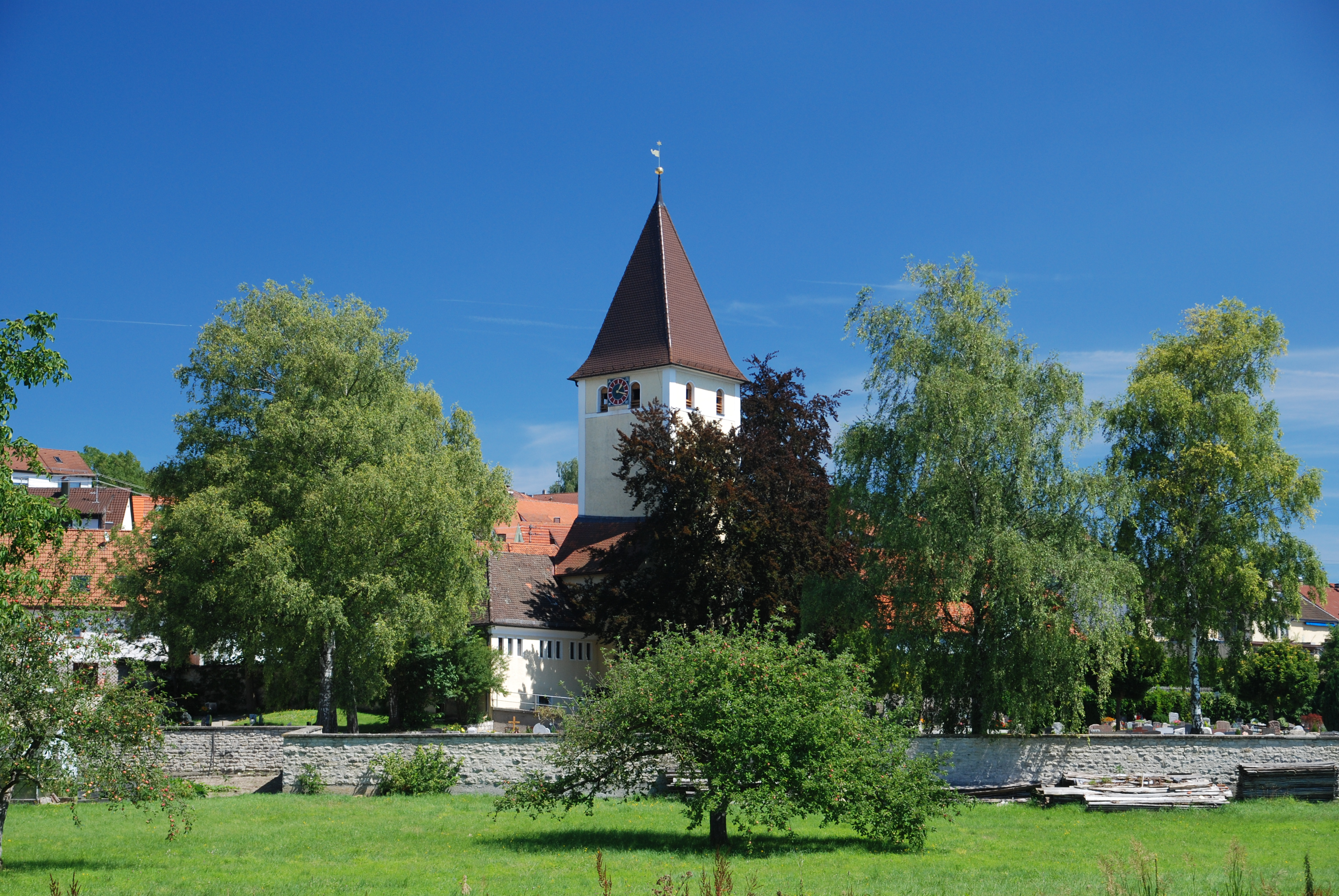

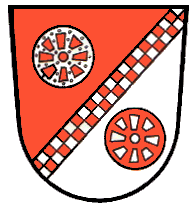
- Coat of arms

- Location of Herbrechtingen within Heidenheim district
- Interactive map of Herbrechtingen
- Location within Germany Location within Baden-Württemberg
- Coordinates: 48°37′31″N 10°10′26″E
- Country: Germany
- State: Baden-Württemberg
- Admin. region: Stuttgart
- District: Heidenheim
- Subdivisions: 6

Government
  - Mayor (2019–27): Daniel Vogt

Area
  - Total: 58.63 km^{2} (22.64 sq mi)
- Elevation: 471 m (1,545 ft)

Population (2025-12-31)
  - Total: 13,281
  - Density: 226.5/km^{2} (586.7/sq mi)
- Time zone: UTC+01:00 (CET)
  - Summer (DST): UTC+02:00 (CEST)
- Postal codes: 89538–89542
- Dialling codes: 07324
- Vehicle registration: HDH
- Website: www.herbrechtingen.de

Herbrechtingen (German pronunciation: [ˈhɛʁbʁɛçtɪŋən]) is a town in the district of Heidenheim in Baden-Württemberg in southern Germany. It is situated on the river Brenz, 7 km south of Heidenheim, and 28 km northeast of Ulm.

== Twin towns – sister cities ==
Herbrechtingen is twinned with:

- Mošnov, Czech Republic (1977)
- Karavukovo, Serbia (1984)
- Horná Štubňa, Slovakia (1986)
- Biatorbágy, Hungary (1989)
