= Dischingen =

- Municipality
- Coat of arms

- Location of Dischingen within Heidenheim district
- Interactive map of Dischingen
- Location within Germany Location within Baden-Württemberg
- Coordinates: 48°41′52″N 10°21′38″E
- Country: Germany
- State: Baden-Württemberg
- Admin. region: Stuttgart
- District: Heidenheim
- Subdivisions: 7

Government
  - Mayor (2022–30): Dirk Schabel

Area
  - Total: 78.06 km^{2} (30.14 sq mi)
- Elevation: 463 m (1,519 ft)

Population (2025-12-31)
  - Total: 4,414
  - Density: 56.55/km^{2} (146.5/sq mi)
- Time zone: UTC+01:00 (CET)
  - Summer (DST): UTC+02:00 (CEST)
- Postal codes: 89561
- Dialling codes: 07327, 07326
- Vehicle registration: HDH
- Website: www.dischingen.de

Dischingen (German pronunciation: [ˈdɪʃɪŋən]) is a municipality in the district of Heidenheim in Baden-Württemberg in southern Germany. The municipality consists of several smaller villages that have been absorbed into Dischingen, Ballmertshofen, Demmingen, Dunstelkingen, Eglingen, Frickingen, and Trugenhofen.

== Demographics ==
Dischingen has 4,484 inhabitants (as of January 18, 2007), of which 1,811 live in Dischingen with the rest in the surrounding communities. The total land area in the community is 78.06 km^{2} (30.14 sq mi), of which 6.68 km^{2} (2.58 sq mi) is buildings, 28.3 km^{2} (10.9 sq mi) is forest, 42.6 km^{2} (16.4 sq mi) is farm land and 0.48 km^{2} (0.19 sq mi) is water.

== History ==
Dischingen is first mentioned in 1049. During the Middle Ages it belonged to the county of Dillingen. When the counts of Dillingen died out in 1258, the county was inherited by the House of Wittelsbach. Following the Landshut War of Succession, in 1505 Dischingen became part of the duchy of Palatinate-Neuburg (German: Pfalz-Neuburg). In 1734 the town became the property of the Princely House of Thurn and Taxis. During the German Mediatisation Dischingen became part of Bavaria, though a few years later, in 1810, it became part of Württemberg.

=== Religion ===
Dischingen was generally untouched by the Reformation and remained solidly Roman Catholic. The members of the Lutheran Evangelical Church in Württemberg in Dischingen belong to the parish of Fleinheim-Dischingen.

=== Expansion ===
On 1 January 1972, the village of Trugenhofen joined Dischingen. Two years later, on 1 January 1974, the villages of Ballmertshofen, Demmingen, Dunstelkingen, Eglingen, Frickingen became part of Dischingen.

== Politics ==
=== Mayor ===
- 1986–2006 Bernd Hitzler
- Since 2006: Alfons Jakl

=== Town Council ===
There are currently 18 seats on the town council. In the town election of 13 June 2004 members of the following two political parties ran with these results:

Party	Percent of Votes	Change from previous	Seats	Change
CDU	55.0%	−0.4	10	−1
FWG	45.0%	+0.4	8	±0

=== Coat of arms ===
The coat of arms is a divided shield, on the left a red background with an upright golden (yellow) key and on the right a gold (yellow) background with three horizontal knives. The three knives come from the coat of arms of Melchior von Tischingen, dating from 1465. The meaning of the key is unknown.

=== Coat of arms of the villages ===
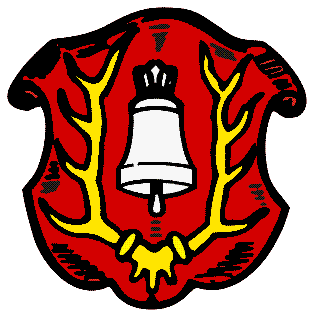
Ballmertshofen

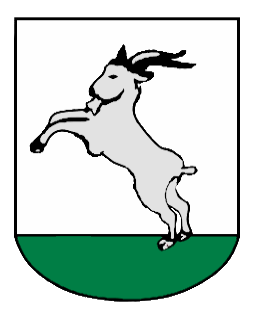
Demmingen

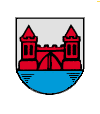
Dunstelkingen

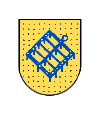
Eglingen

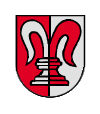
Frickingen

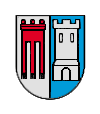
Trugenhofen

== See also ==
- Burg Katzenstein
- Schloss Taxis
- List of castles in Baden-Württemberg
