= Clara Resch =

German politician (born 1995)

Member of the Landtag of Baden-Württemberg
- Incumbent
- Assumed office 1 September 2024
- Preceded by: Martin Grath
- Constituency: Heidenheim (2016–present)

Personal details
- Born: 19 January 1995 (age 31) Steinheim am Albuch
- Party: Alliance 90/The Greens

Clara Resch (born 19 January 1995 in Steinheim am Albuch) is a German politician serving as a member of the Landtag of Baden-Württemberg since 2024. From 2021 to 2023, she served as spokesperson of the Green Youth in Heidenheim.
