= Sontheim an der Brenz =

- Municipality
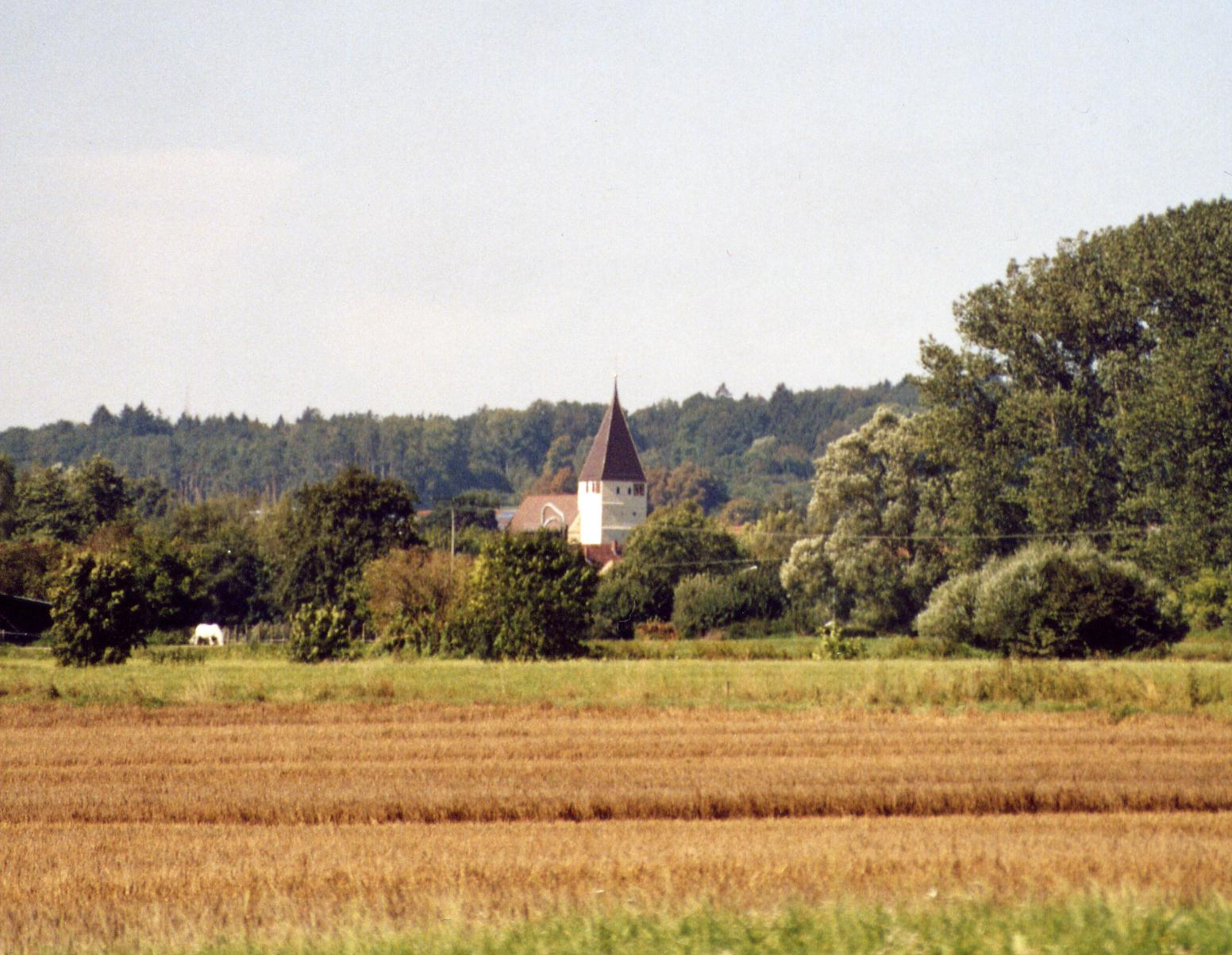
- Church of Saint George

- Coat of arms

- Location of Sontheim an der Brenz within Heidenheim district
- Interactive map of Sontheim an der Brenz
- Location within Germany Location within Baden-Württemberg
- Coordinates: 48°33′25″N 10°17′3″E
- Country: Germany
- State: Baden-Württemberg
- Admin. region: Stuttgart
- District: Heidenheim

Government
  - Mayor (2022–30): Tobias Rief (SPD)

Area
  - Total: 28.92 km^{2} (11.17 sq mi)
- Elevation: 445 m (1,460 ft)

Population (2025-12-31)
  - Total: 5,846
  - Density: 202.1/km^{2} (523.6/sq mi)
- Time zone: UTC+01:00 (CET)
  - Summer (DST): UTC+02:00 (CEST)
- Postal codes: 89567
- Dialling codes: 07325
- Vehicle registration: HDH
- Website: www.sontheim-brenz.de

Sontheim an der Brenz (German pronunciation: [ˈzɔnthaɪm ʔan deːɐ̯ ˈbʁɛnts], lit. 'Sontheim on the Brenz') is a municipality in the district of Heidenheim in Baden-Württemberg in southern Germany. It is located northeast of Ulm, at the southern end of the Swabian Jura.

== Neighboring municipalities ==
Sontheim shares borders with the following towns and villages: Hermaringen (Heidenheim District) in the north, Bächingen an der Brenz (Dillingen District, Bavaria) in the east and the south, as well as Niederstotzingen (Heidenheim District) in the west.

== Villages ==
Sontheim an der Brenz consists of the main community Sontheim and the villages of Brenz and Bergenweiler. Brenz and Bergenweiler became part of Sontheim during Baden-Württemberg's last district reform in the 1970s.

== Twin towns ==
The town is twinned with:

- Saint-Valery-en-Caux, France
