= Hellenstein Castle =

Coordinates: 48°40′33″N 10°08′54″E

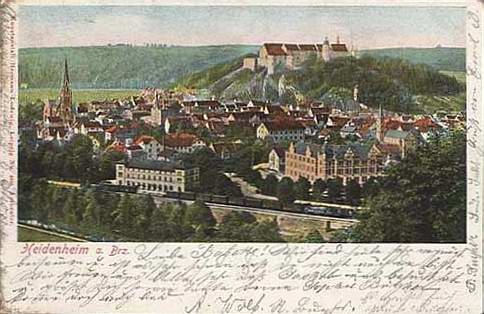
1902 picture of Heidenheim with Hellenstein on the hill in the background

Hellenstein Castle is located 70 meters (230 ft) above the city of Heidenheim an der Brenz in eastern Baden-Württemberg, Germany. It was once the home of the Lords of Hellenstein.

The castle was first built during the 12th century by the Hellenstein family. In 1273 the castle passed out of the control of the Hellensteins and had several owners before coming under the control of the Dukes of Württemberg. On August 5, 1530 the old castle burned to the ground and was rebuilt during the mid-16th century. At the end of the century it was expanded on its eastern flank to create a new castle. During the 17th and early 18th century the castle was at its peak as a symbol of the Württemberg dukes. Around 1762 the family could no longer maintain the castle and it began to fall into disrepair. Eventually some of the stones were sold off as building material.

In 1901 the former castle church was acquired by the Folk and Ancient History Society of Heidenheim as a museum. The museum expanded throughout the first half of the 20th century, until in 1956 the entire castle was rebuilt as a museum. In 1993 the city of Heidenheim took over the museum from the Society. Today the castle contains several museums which are open from March 15 until November 15 Tuesday through Sunday.

== History ==
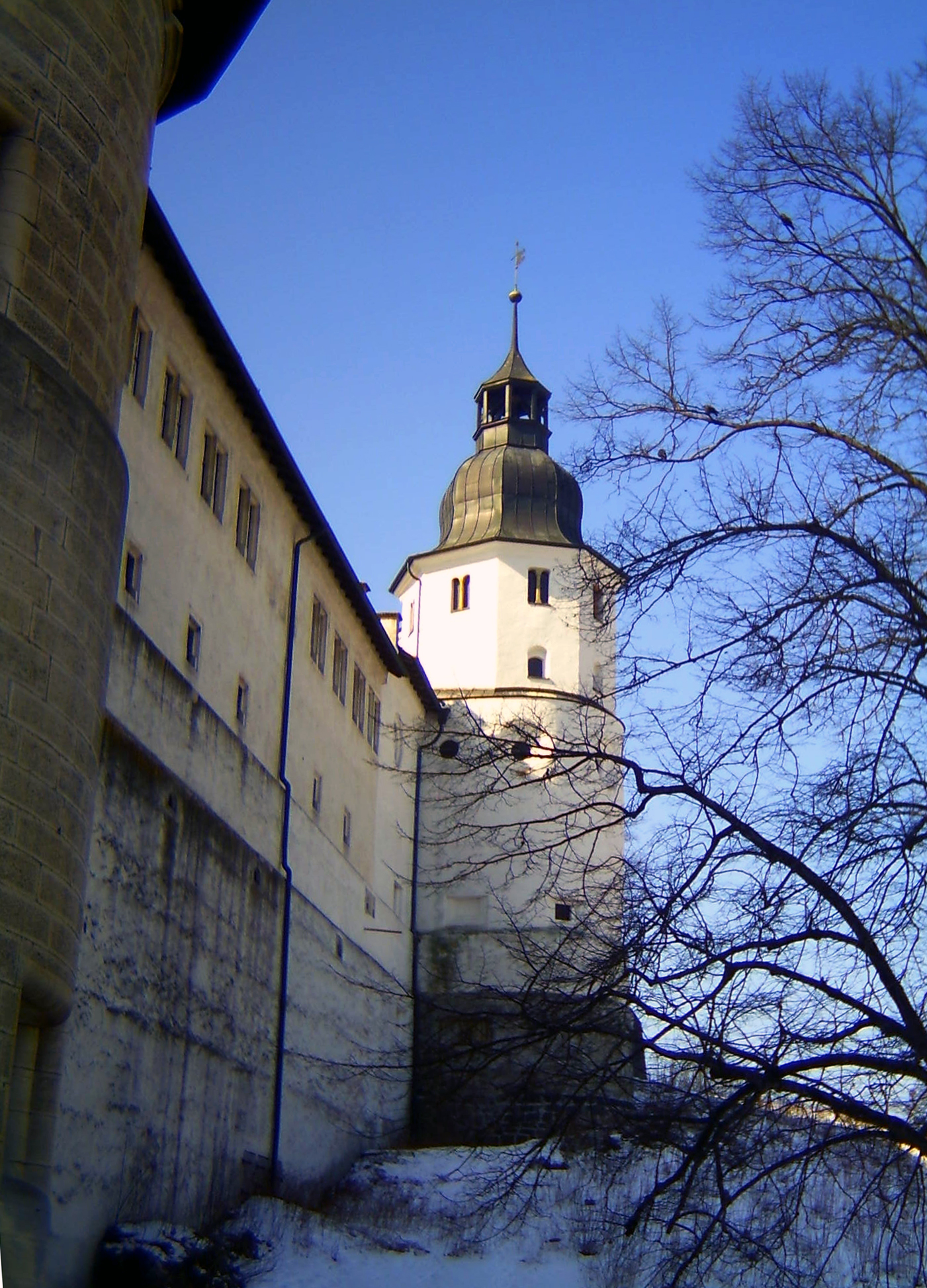
Hellenstein Castle in winter

The site is first mentioned in 1096 by Gozbert de Halensteine whose family may have built the castle in the early 12th century. Within the castle wall there are many buckel stones (squared stone blocks with a rounded or rough outer surface) that date from this time period. The castle remained in the hands of the Hellensteins until 1273 when the male line died out. For almost eighty years the castle passed through several owners. In 1351 the counts of Helfenstein acquired the castle and ruled it for nearly a century, until 1448. Finally in 1503 the castle came under the control of the dukes of Württemberg.

On August 5, 1530 the castle burned to the ground. Ulrich I. von Württemberg ordered that the castle be rebuilt a few years later; the reconstruction lasted from 1537 to 1544. When Duke Frederick I assumed the ducal throne in 1593, he decided that a new castle should be built as an extension east of the old medieval castle. The new castle should be modern and represent the power of the Württemberg dynasty. A planning commission was set up which selected the master builder Henry Schickhardt in 1595. The walls were extended and new towers were built. Two large, decorated towers were built next to the new main gate. A new modern water system, that lifted the water 90 meters (300 ft) to the castle. The construction lasted until 1611.

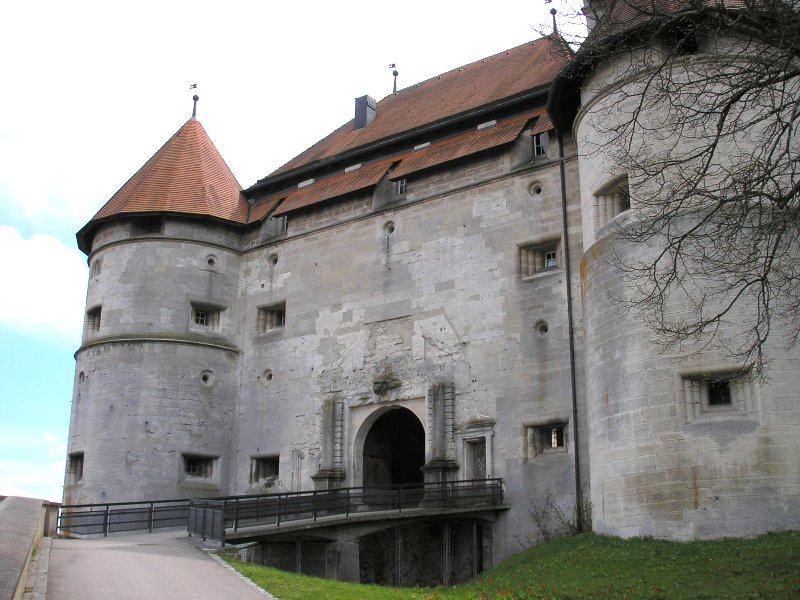
Northern main gate flanked by round towers

During the Thirty Years' War (1618–1648) the castle was damaged and the complex water supply system was destroyed. Before the castle could be reoccupied, a new water supply had to be found. From 1666 to 1670 the Kindlesbrunnen a 78 meters (256 ft) well was dug in the southern part of the castle. The name, Kindlesbrunnen ("baby fountain"), comes from a local legend that instead of being brought by the stork, babies are pulled from the well before they are born. The well cost about 6,750 guilders or about €500,000 in modern currency.

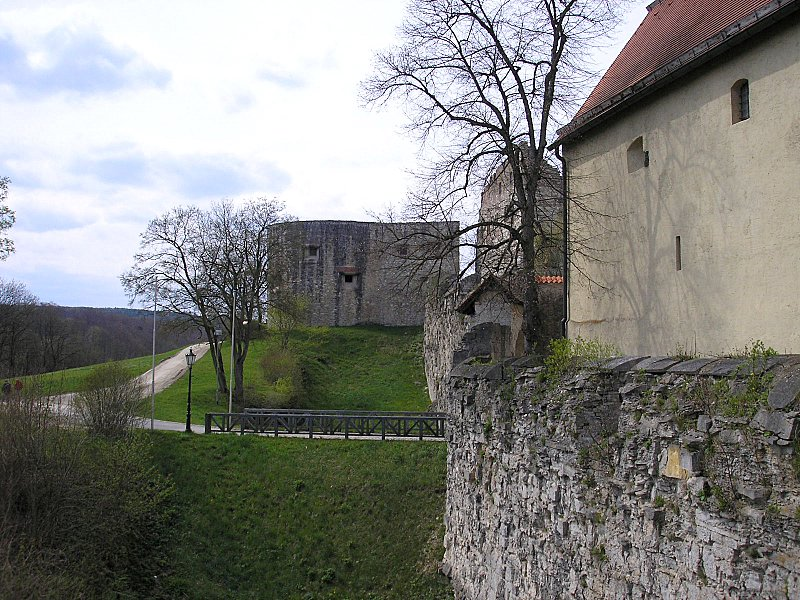
Southern fortifications including the old castle

In 1704, during the War of the Spanish Succession, a French officer with 10,000 men again attempted to take the castle. When they arrived in Heidenheim, they evaluated the castle and the cost of attacking. The commander finally determined that Hellenstein would be too costly to attack, and retreated without firing a shot.

During the 17th and early 18th century the castle was at its peak. Artists and sculptors were brought in to decorate and beautify the castle. In 1593 Frederick I commissioned the Bavarian court painter Friedrich Sustris to paint the walls and ceiling of the round tower. The castle also hosted many prominent guests including Albrecht von Wallenstein (in 1630), Prince Eugene of Savoy (in 1702), Archduke Charles of Austria, (in 1796) and Napoleon Bonaparte (in 1805).

By the mid-18th century the castle had lost importance. Around 1762 the duchy could no longer support renovations on Hellenstein. In 1810 the upper floor of the tower battery was removed and sold as building material. Unfortunately, the wall and ceiling paintings by Friedrich Sustris were destroyed when the upper floor was removed. In 1820 the Ministry of Finance authorized the sale and demolition of the entire old castle. A year later the paper factory Völter, removed portions of the castle to provide building material for their factory. In 1837 the royal planning commission forbade anyone else to remove stones from Hellenstein.

== From castle to museum ==
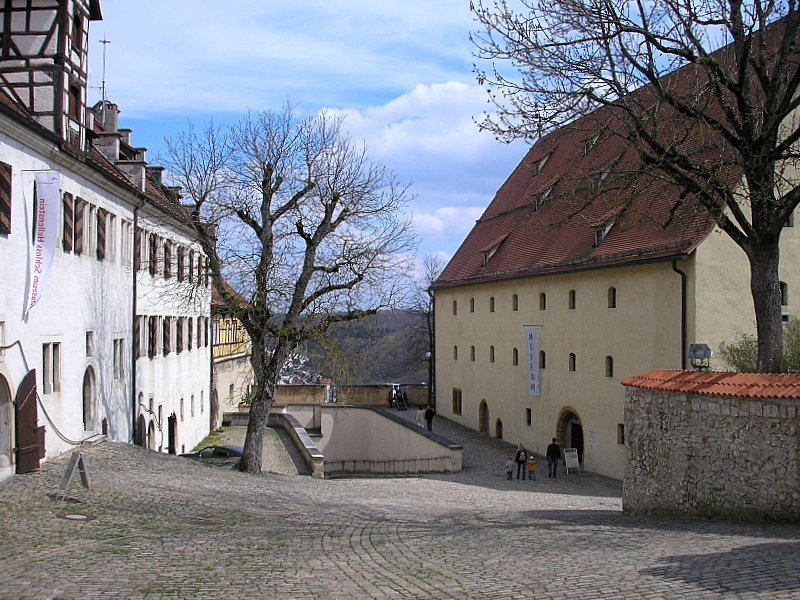
The central courtyard

In 1901 the Castle Folk Museum opened in the former church of the castle. Professor Eugene Gaus of the Folk and Ancient History Society founded the museum with a number of items from his own excavations. Within a year the Society hosted the first Exhibition of Antiquity in the museum. When Alfred Meebold donated his "Indian Collection" the museum had to expand. The Obervogteisall, the upper tower rooms and the basement of the house all became part of the museum. From 1956 to 1960 the museum was upgraded and modified in three stages. For the 75th anniversary, the Society paid for the restoration and conversion of the old arsenal. Between 1982 and 1986 the city of Heidenheim restored the Fruchtkasten or granary and in 1987 opened a transportation museum.

There are actually two different museums in the castle, which can be visited on separate tickets or on a combination ticket. The Museum für Kutschen Chaisen Karren or transportation museum located in the old Fruchtkasten. This museum documents the growth and development of means of transportation before the automobile. In 1987 it was honored by the Europäischen Museums Forum for excellent design and execution. The castle museum includes a theatre which shows movies about the history of Heidenheim, local ancient artifacts, religious art, antique toys and Alfred Meebold's Indian Collection.

== Broadcasting station of SWR ==
SWR operates on Hellenstein castle a low power broadcasting facility, which transmits the following programmes

Program	Frequency	ERP [kW]
SWR1 Baden-Württemberg	87,6 MHz	0,1 kW
SWR4 Baden-Württemberg - Schwabenradio	89,8 MHz	0,1 kW
SWR3	97,6 MHz	0,1 kW
SWR3	97,6 MHz	0,1 kW
SWR2 - Reg. Baden-Württemberg	99,1 MHz	0,1 kW

Until November 1993, there was also a mediumwave broadcasting station on Hellenstein Castle working on 1413 kHz with 100 W.

== See also ==
- Heidenheim an der Brenz
- List of castles in Baden-Württemberg
