= Alb Limes =

Roman frontier fortification

The Alb Limes (German: Alblimes) is a Roman frontier fortification or limes of the late 1st century AD in the Swabian Jura, also known as the Swabian Alb. The Alb Limes runs for just under 135 kilometres from Rottweil (Latin: Arae Flaviae) in the southwest to Heidenheim an der Brenz (Latin: Aquileia), Germany, in the northeast.

== Literature ==
- Regina Franke: Die Kastelle I und II von Arae Flaviae/Rottweil und die römische Okkupation des oberen Neckargebietes. Stuttgart, 2003, ISBN 3-8062-1787-4 (Forschungen und Berichte zur Vor- und Frühgeschichte in Baden-Württemberg, 93).
- Jörg Heiligmann: Der "Alb-Limes". Ein Beitrag zur römischen Besetzungsgeschichte Südwestdeutschlands. Stuttgart, 1990, ISBN 3-8062-0814-X (Forschungen und Berichte zur Vor- und Frühgeschichte in Baden-Württemberg, 35).
- Friedrich Hertlein/Peter Goessler: Die Straßen und Wehranlagen des römischen Württemberg, Band 2 Straßen. In: Die Römer in Württemberg, Teil 2. Stuttgart, 1930
- Rainer Kreutle: Römische Straßen im Ulmer Raum In: B. Reinhardt, K. Wehrberger (eds.): Römer an Donau und Iller. Neue archäologische Forschungen und Funde. Jan Thorbecke Verlag, Sigmaringen, 1996 ISBN 3-7995-0410-9
- Oscar Paret: Württemberg in vor- und frühgeschichtlicher Zeit. Kohlhammer Verlag, Stuttgart, 1961

== See also ==
- Upper Germanic-Rhaetian Limes
