= Steinheim crater =

Impact crater in southern Germany

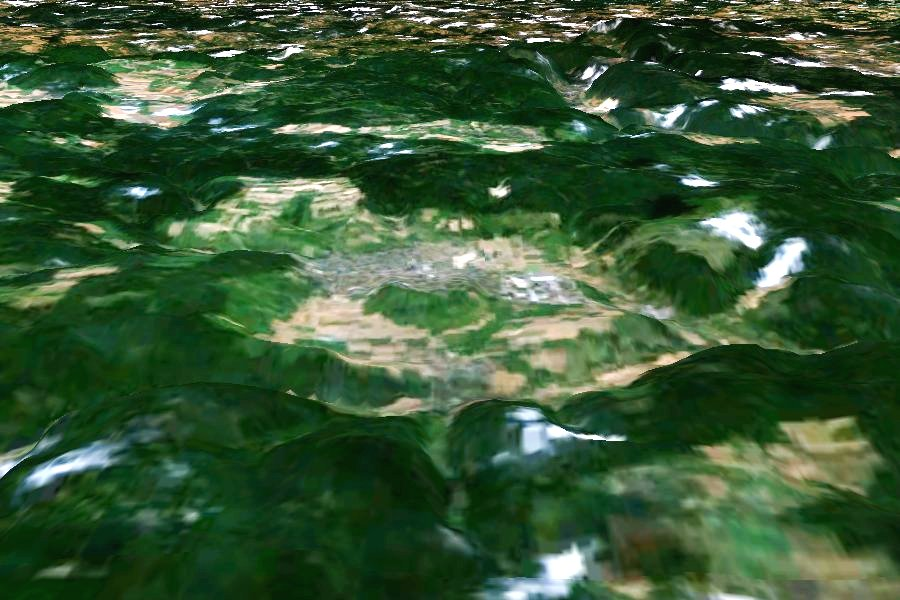
- Synthesized view made with satellite images of Steinheim crater

- Location within Germany
- Location: Steinheim am Albuch, Heidenheim, Baden-Württemberg, Germany; 48°41′12″N 10°03′54″E

Impact crater structure
- Confidence: Confirmed
- Diameter: 3.8 km (2.4 mi)
- Age: 15.1 ± 0.1 Ma; Middle Miocene
- Exposed: Yes
- Drilled: Yes

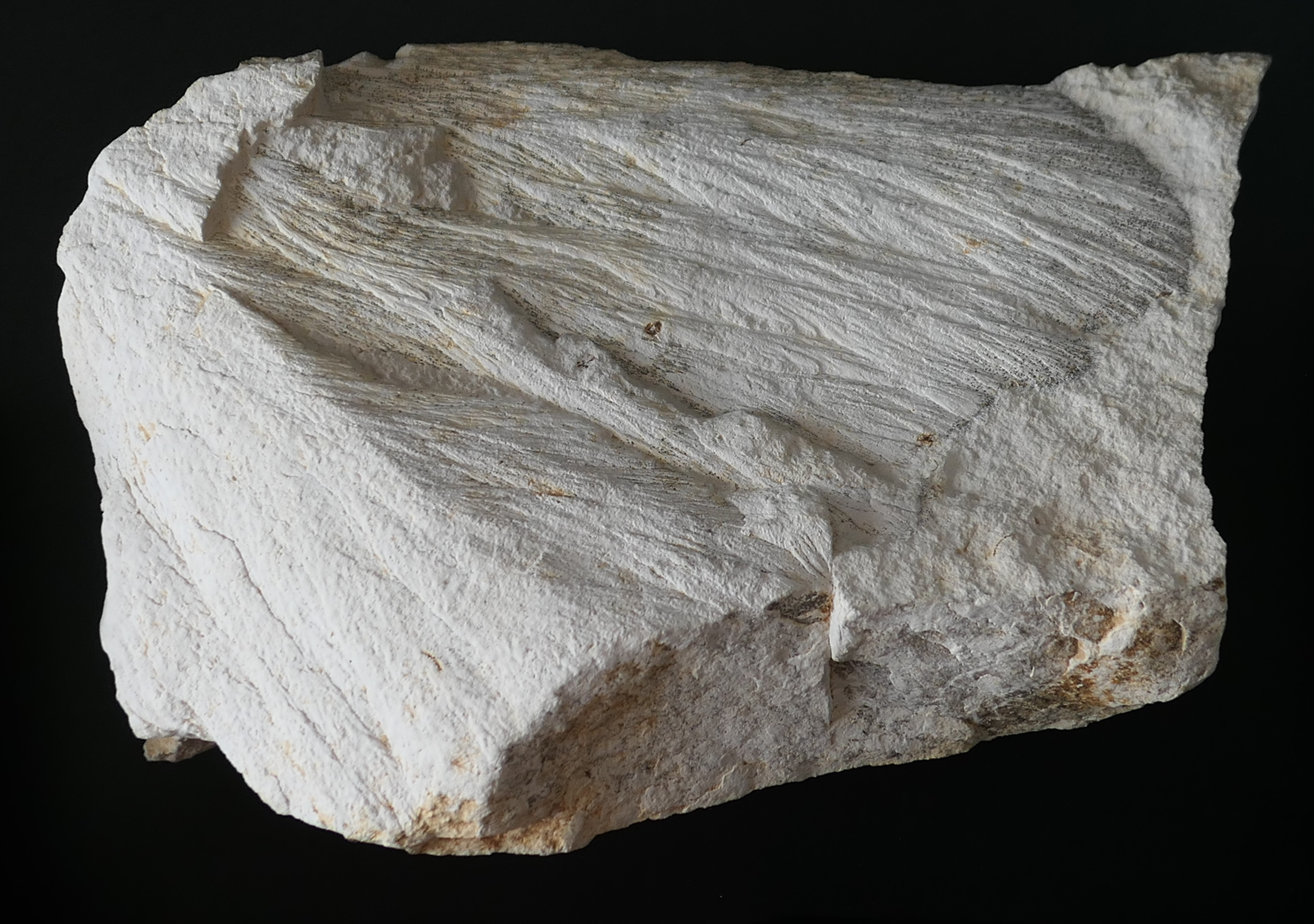
Shatter cone from the Steinheim Basin (type locality), Germany. The width of hand specimen is 25 cm.

The Steinheim crater is a meteorite crater in Steinheim am Albuch, Heidenheim County, Baden-Württemberg, Germany. The crater is located at the north-eastern end of the Swabian Alb, 40km west of the much larger (24-km-diameter) Nördlinger Ries crater.

It is 3.8 km in diameter and the age is estimated to be about 14.3 million years (Miocene). The crater is exposed at the surface. It had previously been thought that the two craters formed simultaneously by the impact of a double asteroid 14.8 million years ago, but a study published in 2020 suggests that Steinheim could actually be about 500,000 years younger than Nördlinger Ries.

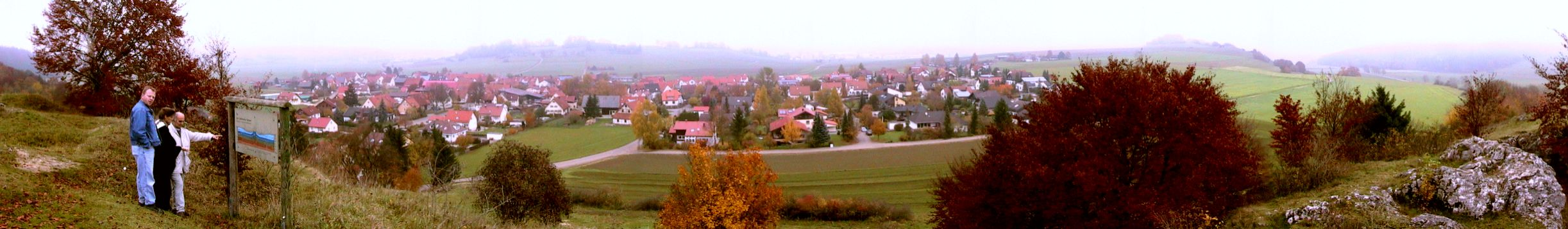
Panoramic view of the Steinheim basin.

== Literature ==
- Johannes Baier: Ein Beitrag zur Shatter-Cone-Bildung (Steinheimer Impaktkrater, Deutschland). In: Aufschluss. 2018, 69(6), S. 370–376.
- Johannes Baier: Zur Shatter-Cone-Bildung (Steinheimer Impaktkrater). In: Aufschluss, 2024, 75(2), S. 89–99.
- Johannes Baier: Geologische Besonderheiten im Albuch. In: Fossilien. Sonderband Geopark Schwäbische Alb, 2015, S. 47–51.
- Johannes Baier: Der Geologische Lehrpfad im Steinheimer Becken – eine kosmische Spurensuche. In: Fossilien. Bd. 30 (2013), Nr. 4, S. 228–232.
- Johannes Baier und Armin Scherzinger: Der neue Geologische Lehrpfad im Steinheimer Impakt-Krater. In: Jahresberichte und Mitteilungen des Oberrheinischen Geologischen Vereins. Bd. 92 (2010), S. 9–24.
- Johannes Baier & Günter Schweigert: Das Steinheimer Meteorkrater-Museum. In: Fossilien. Bd. 42 (2025), Nr. 1, S. 44–53.
