= Brenz an der Brenz =

Coordinates: 48°33′42″N 10°17′45″E

- Borough
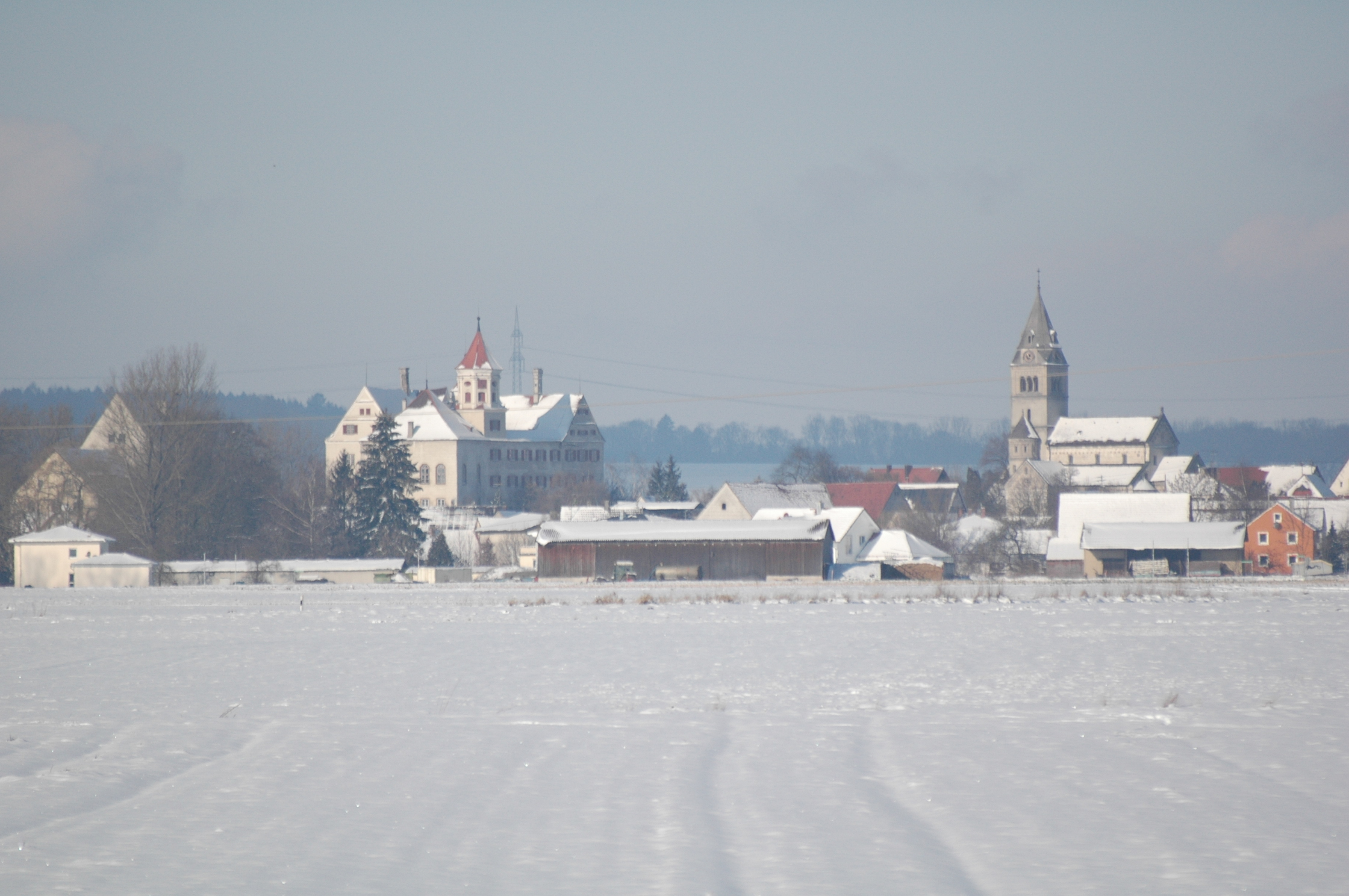
- Brenz from the south-east
- Interactive map of Brenz an der Brenz
- Country: Germany
- State: Baden-Württemberg
- District: Heidenheim
- Village: Sontheim

Population
  - Total: 1,100

Brenz an der Brenz is a borough of the village of Sontheim in the Heidenheim District of Baden-Württemberg in Germany. Brenz an der Brenz was an independent village until it merged with Sontheim. The borough has about 1100 inhabitants.

== Location ==
Brenz an der Brenz is located directly on the Brenz River near the Swabian Alb and the Danube River Valley.

== History ==
The Brenz region has been settled since at least the Roman Empire. In the 2nd or 3rd century C.E., on the commanding Kirchberg in Brenz, a Villa rustica was built. Additional finds of other monumental buildings dating from the Roman era indicate that a Roman town was located here. Brenz also is located at the crossing of two Roman roads; the road from Günzburg (lat. Guntia) to Heidenheim (lat. Aquileia) and the North Danube road from Urspring (lat. Ad Lunam) to Regensburg (lat. Castra Regina). In 2002 on the ancient road between Sontheim and Bächingen a mile stone with the name of Emperor Caracalla and a reference to Faimingen (lat. Phoebiana) was discovered.

Following the invasion of Germanic tribes and the retreat of the Roman Empire in c. 260 C.E., the local Germanic tribe used the strategic Kirchberg to found a settlement. Archeological digs in the 1960s have identified the remains of an early Christian wooden church and graveyard that would have been built around 650. This church is the oldest church in the Brenz valley, and it is likely that the Christianization of the surrounding communities (Sontheim, Bächingen and Bergenweiler) as well as the rest of the Brenz valley started at Brenz an der Brenz. The wood church was replaced with a stone church around 680.

The church on the Brenz is first mentioned during the Early Middle Ages. In 875 Ludwig II gave the Capella ad Prenza to the Monastery at Faurndau. A few years later ownership of the Brenzer Church moved to the Abbey of St. Gall in modern-day Switzerland. Following numerous reconstructions and renovations the Galluskirche (German: Church of St. Gall) reached its final, Romanesque form in 1200.

During the High Middle Ages ownership of Brenz an der Brenz rested with a minor noble family who took their name from the location. Members of this family are mentioned several times in the records from this time. In the Galluskirche there is a gravestone from 1190 for Sebolt von Brenz who is listed as a Crusader. After 1250 a side line of the noble family von Güssenberg (known as Güssen) occupied Schloss Brenz. To pay debts, the family quickly fell into highway robbery and the castle was destroyed under orders of Louis IV in 1340. However the castle was partly repaired soon afterward.

In 1546, during the Schmalkaldic War Charles V. stayed at the Schloss Brenz as a guest of the Güssen.

The Güssen family became too poor to support the castle, and in 1613 sold the entire village and castle to the Duchy of Württemberg. In 1617 Duke Julius Friedrich von Württemberg took the villages of Brenz and Weiltingen under his control, founding the junior Württemberg line of Württemberg-Weiltingen. Schloss Brenz was used as a temporary home for his family. However, the damaged castle was destroyed in 1634 during the Battle of Nördlingen of the Thirty Years' War. In 1672 Duke Friedrich Ferdinand had the castle rebuilt in a Renaissance style.

After the junior Württemberg-Weiltingen line died out, Brenz returned to the main line House of Württemberg. Duke Eberhard Ludwig gave the castle to his mistress Wilhelmine von Grävenitz in 1721. When she fell out of favor, she was forced to leave Württemberg and all her gifts behind. Schloss Brenz remained generally empty afterward, though a branch of the family von Racknitz lived in the castle for a short while.

In the 19th century the community inherited the castle. It was used for by the city government and also as a school. In 1906 the oldest Community Heritage Museum in Württemberg was founded in the castle.

In 1972 the community of Brenz an der Brenz was absorbed into the larger village of Sontheim, which had been founded by Brenz.

== Culture and sights ==
=== Museums ===
The Community Heritage Museum in Schloss Brenz is the oldest such museum in Württemberg.

=== Buildings ===
- Church of St. Gall or Galluskirche: The late romanesque Basilica is, from a historical standpoint, one of the most significant constructions in the Heidenheim District as well as all of Baden-Württemberg. During the renovation of the church in 1964/66 every effort was made to bring the church back to a true romanesque style. Gothic, Baroque and neo-Gothic elements from earlier reconstructions were removed from the church. The romanesque paintings in the apse were restored and can now be seen in the church.
- Schloss Brenz: Excellent example of a renaissance castle. Richly decorated arcades of the courtyard (German: Innenhof) and the Knights Hall (German: Rittersaal) are especially noteworthy.
- Market Square (German: Marktplatz): The market square is surrounded with several historical facades including the Galluskirche, the Rectory, Schlössle (Little Castle) which is today the Hotel Hirsch, Hotel Krone and the town hall.

== Literature ==
- Cichy, Bodo: Die Kirche von Brenz, 1991 (3. Aufl.).
- Gemeinde Sontheim an der Brenz (Hg.): Heimatbuch Sontheim an der Brenz, 1984.
