= Bernhard Ilg =

German politician

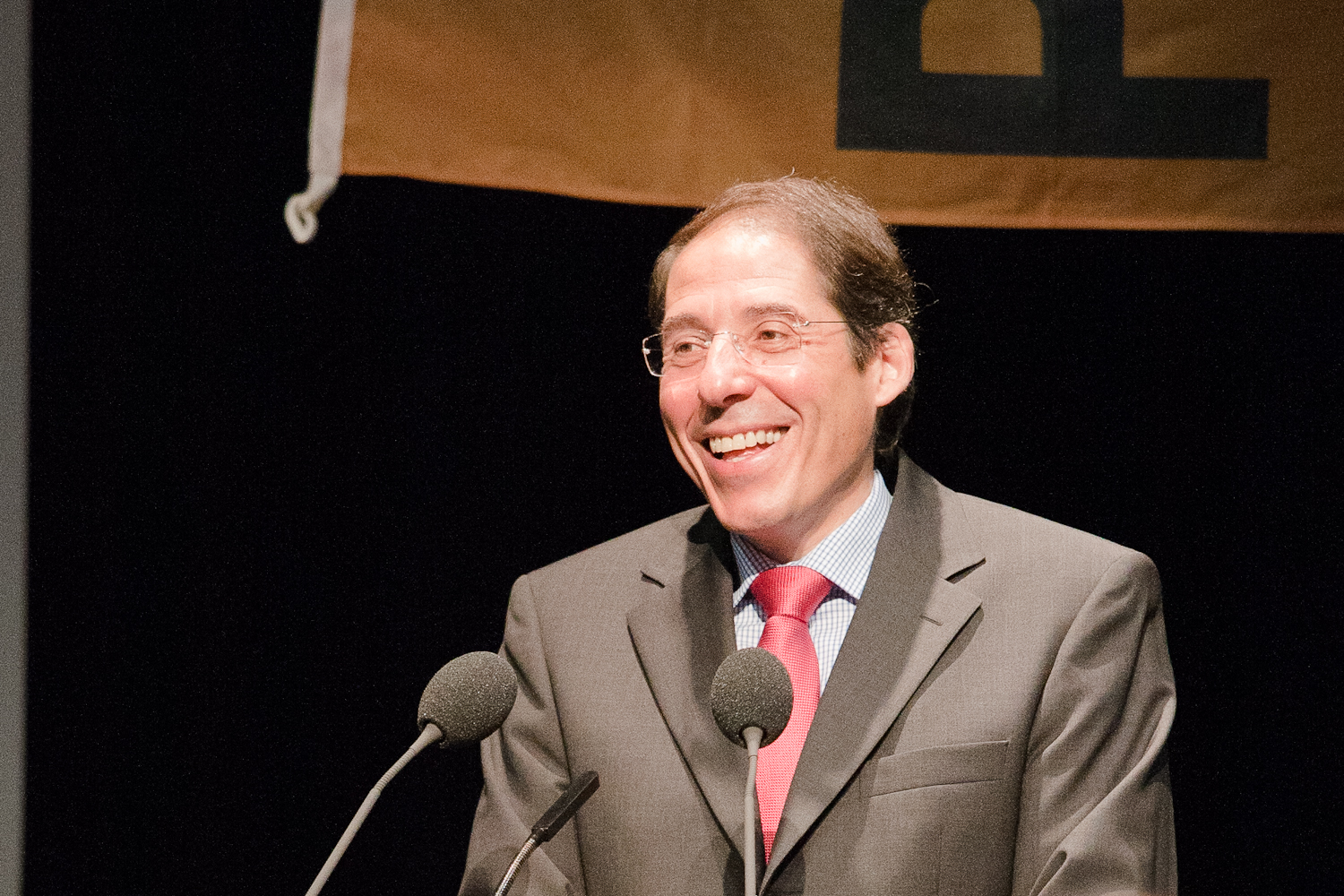
Ilg in 2011

Bernhard Ilg (born in Geislingen an der Steige on 8 February 1956) is a German politician of the Christian Democratic Union (CDU). He is Mayor (Oberbürgermeister) of the Große Kreisstadt Heidenheim an der Brenz in Baden-Württemberg's region of Ostwürttemberg.

He graduated in Public management (Diplom-Verwaltungswirt) in 1980. Thereafter he was district bailiff (Kreisamtmann) at the Landratsamt of Biberach where he was in charge of finance and carrying out special tasks until 1986. From 1986 to 28 November 1999, Ilg was Mayor of Salach. He is Oberbürgermeister of Heidenheim since 1 February 2000, re-elected on 11 November 2007. In 2000, he was elected with a narrow majority; however, in 2007 he received 82.27 percent of votes. Since 13 June 2004, Ilg is also a member of the Heidenheim district county council (Kreistag).

Bernhard Ilg is also chairman of the Heidenheim public utility company, member of the board of directors of the Heidenheim Kreissparkasse (county savings bank), president of the water board of Wedel-Brenz and member of the advisory board for the programme of Radio 7. Furthermore, Ilg is president of the Stauferland tourism association and a member of Mayors for Peace.
