= Ilg =

Ilg is a surname. Notable people with the surname include:

- Alfred Ilg (1854–1916), Swiss engineer
- Bernhard Ilg (born 1956), German politician
- Dieter Ilg (born 1961), German musician
- Frances Ilg (1902–1981), American pediatrician
- Konrad Ilg (1877–1954), Swiss trade unionist and politician
- Patriz Ilg (born 1957), German steeplechaser
