= Clem Jackson =

English footballer

Personal information
- Full name: Alfred Clement Jackson
- Date of birth: 1886
- Place of birth: Kimberley, Nottinghamshire, England
- Date of death: 28 August 1960 (aged 73–74)
- Position: Right back

Senior career*
| Years | Team | Apps | (Gls) |
- Kimberley St John's
- Eastwood Rangers
| 1909–1920 | Lincoln City | 224 | (0) |
- * Club domestic league appearances and goals

Alfred Clement Jackson (1886 – 28 August 1960) was an English professional footballer who made 184 appearances in the Football League playing for Lincoln City. He played as a right back.

== Life and career ==
Jackson was born in Kimberley, Nottinghamshire, and played football for local clubs Kimberley St John's and Eastwood Rangers before joining Lincoln City. He made his debut in January 1909, and contributed to Lincoln becoming champions of the Midland League and consequent re-election to the Football League. He played regularly from then on, making more than 30 appearances each season until the First World War put a stop to league football in 1915. He played 15 games in the first post-war season, his last appearances in Lincoln's first team.

Jackson died in 1960 aged about 74.
