= Francis Xavier Resch =

20th-century American Old Catholic bishop

- Predecessor: Paul Francis Cope
- Successor: Walter Xavier Brown

Orders
- Ordination: March 5, 1939 by Paul Francis Cope
- Consecration: December 8, 1940 by Carmel Henry Carfora

Personal details
- Born: 1878 Sanct Georgen, Austria
- Died: 1976 (aged 97–98) Kankakee, Illinois
- Denomination: Old Catholic Church of America, North American Old Roman Catholic Church

Ordination history of Francis Xavier Resch
History
Episcopal consecration
- Consecrated by: Carmel Henry Carfora
Episcopal succession
Bishops consecrated by Francis Xavier Resch as principal consecrator
- Walter Xavier Brown: August 25, 1963

Francis Xavier Resch (1878–1976) was a bishop of the Old Catholic Church of America.

== Biography ==
Resch was a graduate of Southern Normal University in Huntingdon, Tennessee and received his degree in languages. He taught Latin and German at the public high school in Earlsboro, Oklahoma, in 1912. He married Christine Agnes Dienhart, an Episcopalian, on May 1, 1912, who bore him two children. The first child died in Earlsboro, but the second child, Frederick Sylvester, born December 31, 1913, lived to become an Episcopal priest and served in a parish in Kingman, Arizona.

Resch published a newspaper in Earlsboro and later moved it to Shawnee, Oklahoma, in 1913. He was superintendent of schools at Leadville, Arkansas, from 1930 to 1962, later moving to Kansas City, Missouri, where he qualified for the priesthood under Bishop Paul Francis Cope who ordained him on March 5, 1939. Bishop Cope was consecrated by Archbishop James Bartholomew Ranks of London who came specifically for that purpose to America and thus the Old Catholic Church of America was officially launched in May 1925.

As an Independent Old Catholic priest, Resch was anxious to promote the growth and impact of the church. Bishop Cope was, in the new priest's opinion, too conservative and deliberate, so yielding to the influences brought to bear upon him by Carforian clergy, withdrew from Cope's jurisdiction to that of Carfora. He describes this in a letter dated August 19, 1942 to Father Charles Bauer of Chicago:

The growth of the church was very slow because of the Archbishop's great care and solicitude against taking in men who were not worthy of the trust. He hesitated taking men into the church until I came along . . . but because his hesitancy to expand and reach out, I withdrew and went over to the North American Old Roman Catholic Church. I was consecrated a bishop in that church by Carfora. I soon learned that I had made a great mistake in joining that church. I went back to Archbishop Cope, to bask again in the sunshine of a saintly man, a man of whom anyone could be proud, After coming back, he told me that he had intended to consecrate me to the bishopric and prevailed upon me to accept the office of auxiliary bishop, which I did. The Archbishop is very conscientious, and he has kept the church free from all evil influences.

Accepting Carfora's consecration of Resch as valid, Cope appointed Resch his auxiliary on June 15, 1941. He was insistent that the church distinguish itself as legitimately and theologically Old Catholic:

There are at the present time so many of the independent churches that it is hard to distinguish one from the other. There is only one way to know the Old Catholic Church of America and to distinguish it from the others, and that is by its purity of purpose, it honesty and its upright Christian polity." And again "We want to guard against Carforism. Our Church is clean and pure. Every man is a gentleman. Every man is a priest, a shepherd of souls. The Church is young and small but it is holy and without spot. The size of the church is less important than the nature and kind of clergy it possesses. We teach and believe all that ancient and historic Catholic Christendom teaches.

Resch served the church well in Missouri and in Mississippi later coming to Illinois where as an Independent Old Catholic priest he served in Episcopal parishes. He served for a while in St. Margaret parish, Park Fall, Diocese of Eau Claire, Wisconsin and then in Good Shepherd parish, Momence, Illinois as listed in the 1953 Episcopal Church directory.

Resch succeeded Cope as Archbishop of the church and established the headquarters in Illinois. He was a man of education and breeding fitting Newman's definition of a gentleman in all respects. He struggled to fulfill his charge as Archbishop, keeping the church solvent by committing his financial resources as well as his talents to the mission of the church. He consecrated Walter Xavier Brown as bishop August 25, 1963, who succeeded him as Archbishop upon his retirement. He died in 1976.
