= LLG =

LLG or variation, may refer to:

- The Landau–Lifshitz–Gilbert equation, used in micromagnetics
- Local government
  - Local-level governments of Papua New Guinea
- The Logical Language Group
- Lole language (ISO 639 code: llg)
- Lycée Louis-le-Grand, a well known public high school in Paris
- Chillagoe Airport, IATA airport code "LLG"

== See also ==
- 2LG
- LG (disambiguation)
