= Nattheim =

- Municipality
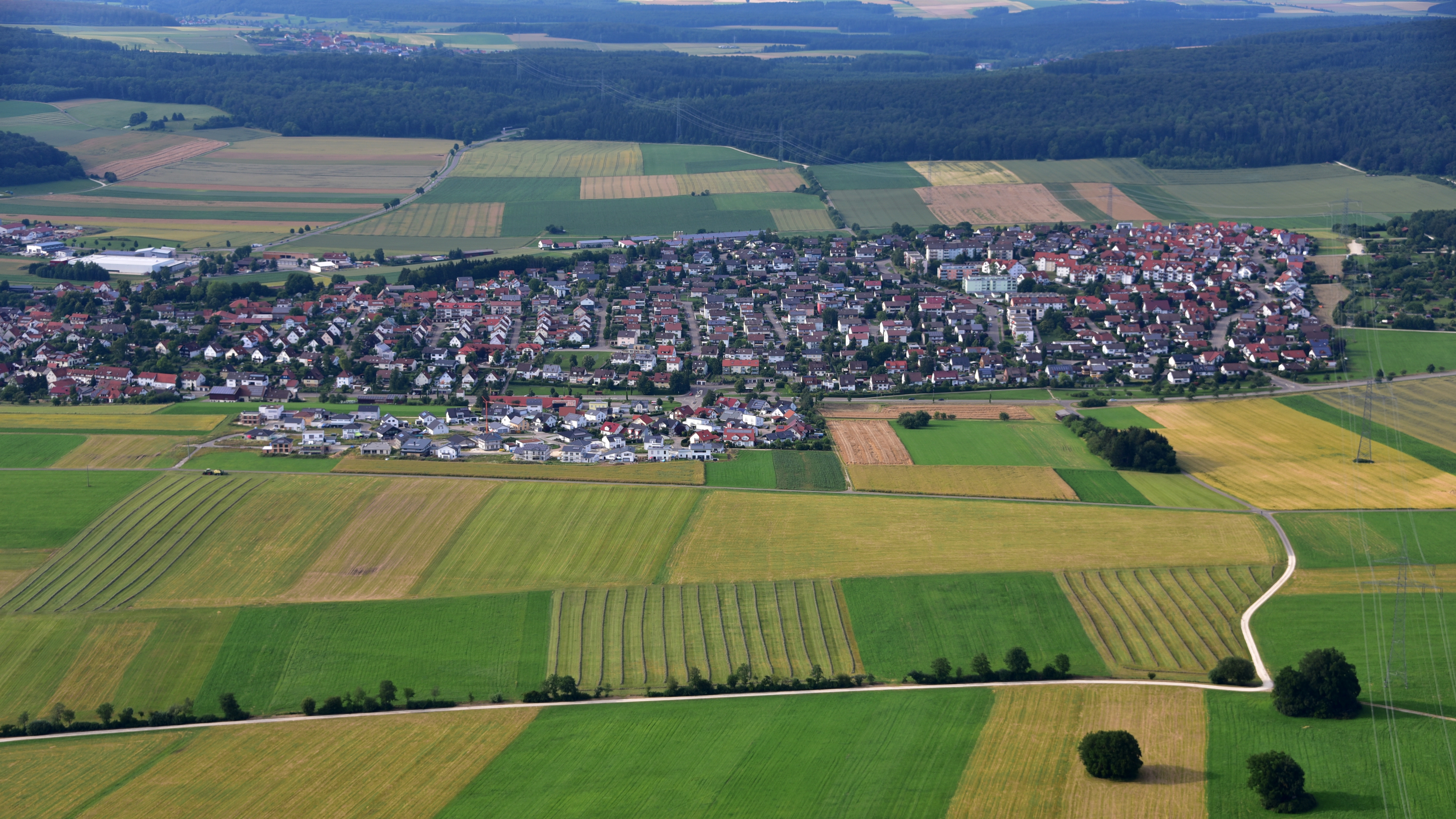
- Aerial view of Nattheim

- Coat of arms

- Location of Nattheim within Heidenheim district
- Interactive map of Nattheim
- Location within Germany Location within Baden-Württemberg
- Coordinates: 48°41′57″N 10°14′29″E
- Country: Germany
- State: Baden-Württemberg
- Admin. region: Stuttgart
- District: Heidenheim

Government
  - Mayor (2018–26): Norbert Bereska

Area
  - Total: 44.99 km^{2} (17.37 sq mi)
- Elevation: 560 m (1,840 ft)

Population (2025-12-31)
  - Total: 6,531
  - Density: 145.2/km^{2} (376.0/sq mi)
- Time zone: UTC+01:00 (CET)
  - Summer (DST): UTC+02:00 (CEST)
- Postal codes: 89564
- Dialling codes: 07321
- Vehicle registration: HDH
- Website: www.nattheim.de

Nattheim (German pronunciation: [ˈnathaɪm]) is a municipality in the district of Heidenheim in Baden-Württemberg in southern Germany. The town hall is located in the middle of the city, and is situated at the intersection of the city church building and pharmacy.

Home of "Nattheimer" brand beer and is largely a farming community with a few industrial companies.

== Demographics ==
Population development:

| Year | Inhabitants |
|---|---|
| 1990 | 5.807 |
| 2001 | 6.379 |
| 2011 | 6,167 |
| 2021 | 6,278 |
