= Steinheim am Albuch =

- Municipality
- Coat of arms

- Location of Steinheim am Albuch within Heidenheim district
- Interactive map of Steinheim am Albuch
- Location within Germany Location within Baden-Württemberg
- Coordinates: 48°41′32″N 10°3′51″E
- Country: Germany
- State: Baden-Württemberg
- Admin. region: Stuttgart
- District: Heidenheim
- Subdivisions: 9

Government
  - Mayor (2018–26): Holger Weise

Area
  - Total: 82.42 km^{2} (31.82 sq mi)
- Elevation: 540 m (1,770 ft)

Population (2025-12-31)
  - Total: 8,790
  - Density: 107/km^{2} (276/sq mi)
- Time zone: UTC+01:00 (CET)
  - Summer (DST): UTC+02:00 (CEST)
- Postal codes: 89555
- Dialling codes: 07329
- Vehicle registration: HDH
- Website: www.steinheim.com

Steinheim am Albuch (German pronunciation: [ˈʃtaɪnhaɪm ʔam ˈʔalbuːx], lit. 'Steinheim on the Albuch') is a municipality in the district of Heidenheim in Baden-Württemberg in southern Germany. Steinheim is known for its meteorite crater.

== People ==
- 1959: Stefan Laufer, pharmacist
- 1995: Clara Resch, politician
