= Alfred Thomas Jackson =

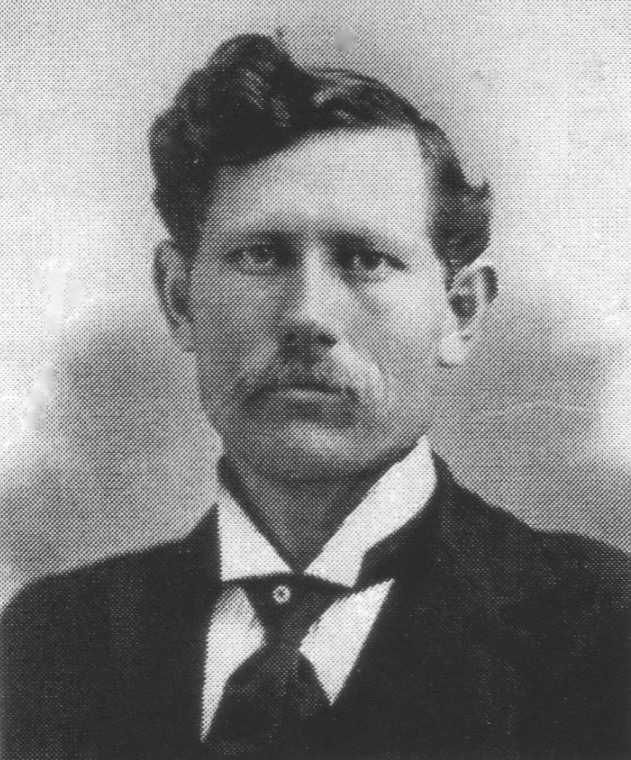
Alfred Thomas Jackson, c. 1900

Alfred Thomas Jackson (June 30, 1864 – May 13, 1928) was an American educator who founded Sumner-Robertson Normal College in Tennessee in 1900. It was a private college chartered by the State of Tennessee that supplemented the existing public schools in educating teachers. The name of the school came from its location along the border of two adjacent Tennessee counties, Sumner and Robertson, at the town of White House. To build his school, Jackson obtained seven investors, then personally supervised all phases of the construction including himself cutting down trees and receiving help from local townsfolk. During the early 20th century, there was a growing national awareness of the need for better preparation of teachers. So-called "normal schools" were expected to establish "norms" of teaching standards.

The Sumner-Robertson Normal School had about 300 students in its 1905–1906 session with graduates in the teachers' group and the scientific group. It offered foreign languages and higher mathematics. Some of its graduates went on to become successful politicians, physicians and attorneys. After 20 years, Jackson sold the school to the two counties who converted it to a public high school. Jackson died at age 64 at Vanderbilt Hospital in Nashville on May 13, 1928.

== Early life ==
Jackson was born in Calloway County, Kentucky in 1864. His father, George W. Jackson, (1828–1908), was a merchant who lost his business and his property in the Civil War. His grandfather, Alfred Jackson, left North Carolina in the early 19th century to move to Kentucky at a time when native Americans were numerous there. Alfred Thomas Jackson was educated at the Murray, Kentucky elementary and high schools. He went to Southern Normal University in Huntingdon, Tennessee and received a B.S. degree. He later received a B.A. degree from Peabody College in Nashville. His career as a teacher started with a job in Alamo, Tennessee, where he helped organize a high school. He taught Greek and Latin for a year in Ripley, Tennessee. He was drawn to Sumner County, Tennessee, the home of his future wife, Idella Payne. He wanted to build a school there and found a site in White House, Tennessee, located at the border of Sumner and Robertson Counties. With the help of seven investors and with neighbors helping, Jackson built a school, cutting trees himself and supervising all phases of the project. The school opened in 1900. He married Idella Payne in 1899, they had two children, Lucy and Thomas, in rapid succession. Jackson's wife died in 1902, leaving him with the two small children. In 1903, Jackson fell in love with Idella's first cousin, Myra Victoria Barry, who was then the valedictorian of the graduating class of Jackson's Sumner-Robertson Normal College. After the graduation ceremonies, Jackson said, "I hope everyone will remain for a little surprise". The minister who had delivered the baccalaureate sermon then had Myra Barry, age 22, come back on the stage for a wedding with 39 year-old headmaster A.T.Jackson. They had nine children between 1904 and 1920. Two children (twins) died shortly after birth; the others were Madeline, Mary Ellen, Rubye, George Woodrow, Alfred Edison, Lora and Lenna Lillian. It was his wish that all his children be college graduates.

After his school was purchased by the governments of Sumner and Robertson Counties in 1920, he continued teaching or serving as principal at high schools in Stewart, Cheatham and Fayette counties and, jointly with his wife, taught summer schools at Union University in Jackson, Tennessee. After his death in 1928, Myra Jackson continued teaching at Middleton High School in Middleton, Tennessee.
