= Hermaringen =

- Municipality
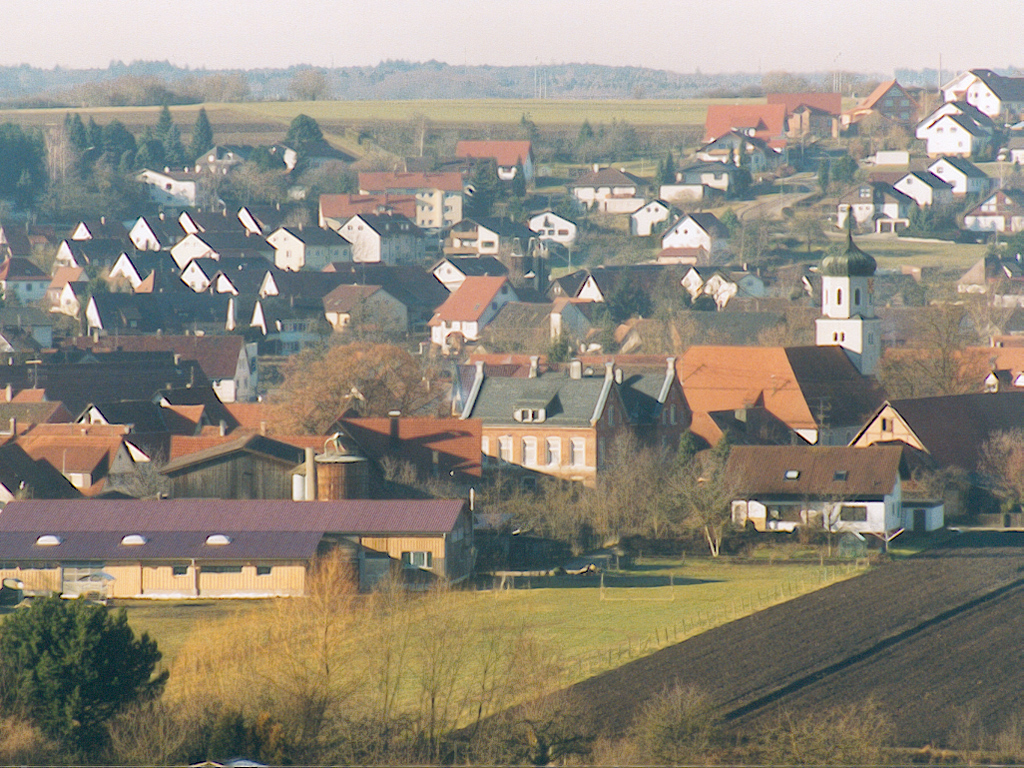

- Coat of arms

- Location of Hermaringen within Heidenheim district
- Interactive map of Hermaringen
- Location within Germany Location within Baden-Württemberg
- Coordinates: 48°35′44″N 10°15′35″E
- Country: Germany
- State: Baden-Württemberg
- Admin. region: Stuttgart
- District: Heidenheim

Government
  - Mayor (2018–26): Jürgen Mailänder (Ind.)

Area
  - Total: 15.25 km^{2} (5.89 sq mi)
- Elevation: 498 m (1,634 ft)

Population (2025-12-31)
  - Total: 2,339
  - Density: 153.4/km^{2} (397.2/sq mi)
- Time zone: UTC+01:00 (CET)
  - Summer (DST): UTC+02:00 (CEST)
- Postal codes: 89568
- Dialling codes: 07322
- Vehicle registration: HDH
- Website: www.hermaringen.de

Hermaringen (German pronunciation: [ˈhɛʁmaʁɪŋən]) is a municipality in the district of Heidenheim in Baden-Württemberg in southern Germany.

Hermaringen is known as the birthplace of Georg Elser, who tried to assassinate Adolf Hitler on 8 November 1939.

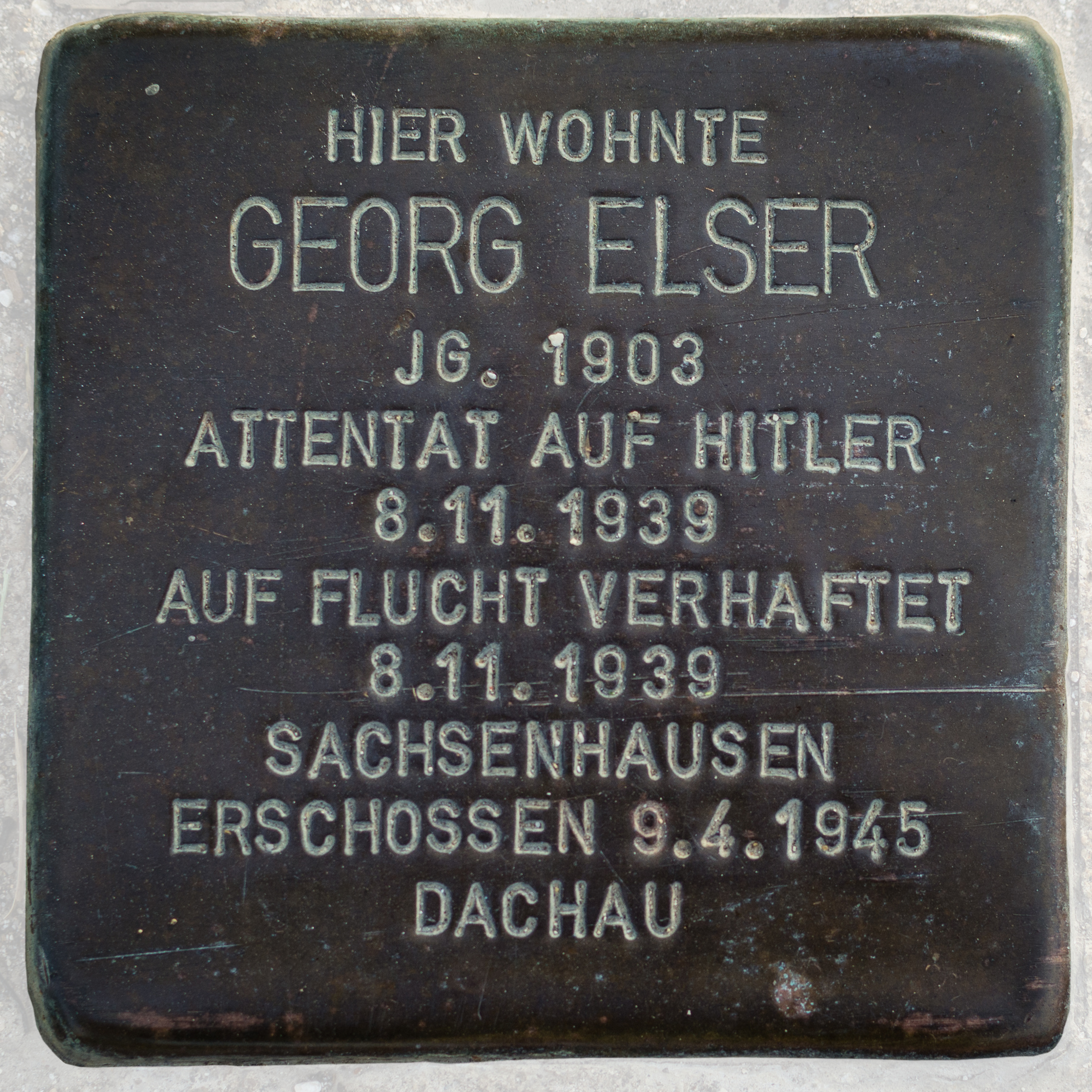
Stolperstein Georg Elser in Hermaringen
