= Heidenheim (district) =

Coordinates: 48.64°N 10.12°E

- District
- Flag Coat of arms
- Country: Germany
- State: Baden-Württemberg
- Adm. region: Stuttgart
- Capital: Heidenheim an der Brenz

Government
  - District admin.: Peter Polta

Area
  - Total: 627.19 km^{2} (242.16 sq mi)

Population (31 December 2025)
  - Total: 135,075
  - Density: 215.37/km^{2} (557.79/sq mi)
- Time zone: UTC+01:00 (CET)
  - Summer (DST): UTC+02:00 (CEST)
- Vehicle registration: HDH
- Website: http://www.landkreis-heidenheim.de

Heidenheim (German pronunciation: [ˈhaɪdn̩ˌhaɪm]) is a Landkreis (district) in the east of Baden-Württemberg, Germany. Neighboring districts are (from north clockwise) Ostalbkreis, Dillingen, Günzburg, Alb-Donau and Göppingen.

== History ==
The district dates back to the Oberamt Heidenheim, which was created at the beginning of the 19th century. In 1808 it was enlarged by merging with the Oberamt Giengen. It was converted into a district in 1934/38, and enlarged by municipalities from the Oberamt Neresheim and the Oberamt Ulm. The communal reform of 1973 left the district virtually unchanged.

== Geography ==
The district is located in the high plains of the Swabian Alb (Schwäbische Alb) mountains.

== Coat of arms ==
The coat of arms show the colors of the Lords of Hellenstein in the left half. They ruled the city Heidenheim until 1307. The castle tower to the right symbolizes the many castles in the district. The area was split between many ruling families, who built castles for protecting their ownership.

== Cities and municipalities ==
Clickable map of towns and municipalities in the district

Cities
1. Giengen (Brenz)
2. Heidenheim (Brenz)
3. Herbrechtingen
4. Niederstotzingen
Administrative districts
1. Giengen
2. Heidenheim
3. Sontheim-Niederstotzingen
Municipalities
1. Dischingen
2. Gerstetten
3. Hermaringen
4. Königsbronn
5. Nattheim
6. Sontheim (Brenz)
7. Steinheim am Albuch

=== Former cities and villages ===
former villages	villages (nowadays)	population (June 6, 1961)
Auernheim	Nattheim	594
Ballmertshofen	Dischingen	431
Bergenweiler	Sontheim an der Brenz	275
Bissingen ob Lontal	Herbrechtingen	465
Bolheim	Herbrechtingen	2.896
Brenz	Sontheim an der Brenz	1.174
Burgberg	Giengen an der Brenz	1.805
Demmingen	Dischingen	501
Dettingen am Albuch	Gerstetten	1.411
Dischingen	Dischingen	1.423
Dunstelkingen	Dischingen	431
Eglingen	Dischingen	635
Fleinheim	Nattheim	374
Frickingen	Dischingen	479
Gerstetten	Gerstetten	4.655
Giengen an der Brenz, Stadt	Giengen an der Brenz	10.825
Großkuchen	Heidenheim an der Brenz	961
Gussenstadt	Gerstetten	1.173
Hausen ob Lontal	Herbrechtingen	165
Heidenheim an der Brenz, Große Kreisstadt	Heidenheim an der Brenz	48.792
Heldenfingen	Gerstetten	970
Herbrechtingen	Herbrechtingen	6.454
Hermaringen	Hermaringen	1.940
Heuchlingen	Gerstetten	759
Hohenmemmingen	Giengen an der Brenz	1.209
Hürben	Giengen an der Brenz	907
Itzelberg	Königsbronn	606
Königsbronn	Königsbronn	4.258
Nattheim	Nattheim	2.346
Niederstotzingen, Stadt	Niederstotzingen	2.138
Oberstotzingen	Niederstotzingen	842
Ochsenberg	Königsbronn	451
Oggenhausen	Heidenheim an der Brenz	918
Sachsenhausen	Giengen an der Brenz	232
Söhnstetten	Steinheim am Albuch	1.369
Sontheim an der Brenz	Sontheim an der Brenz	2.964
Steinheim am Albuch	Steinheim am Albuch	4.358
Stetten ob Lontal	Niederstotzingen	427
Trugenhofen	Dischingen	320
Zang	Königsbronn	520
