= Erich Rudorffer =

German World War II fighter pilot (1917–2016)

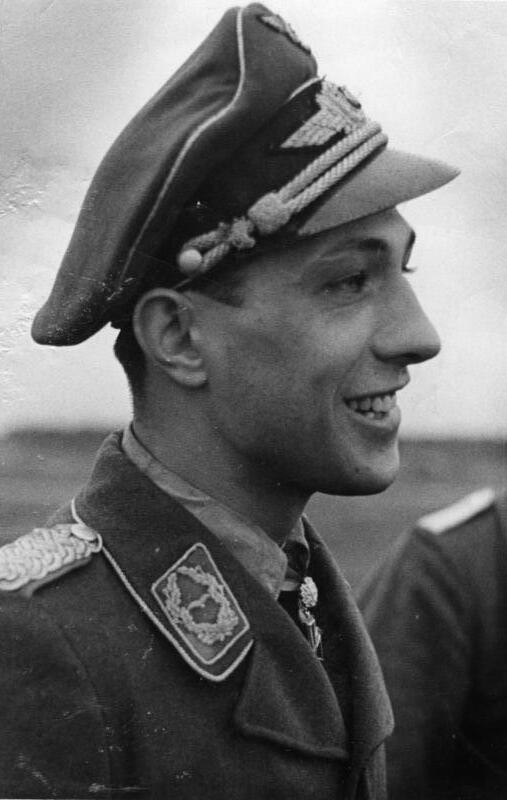
- Erich Rudorffer in 1944
- Born: 1 November 1917; Zwochau, Saxony, German Empire
- Died: 8 April 2016 (aged 98); Bad Schwartau, Germany
- Military career
- Allegiance: Nazi Germany
- Branch: Luftwaffe
- Service years: 1936–1945
- Rank: Major (major)
- Nickname: Fighter of Libau
- Units: JG 2, JG 7 and JG 54
- Commands: 6./JG 2, II./JG 2, I./JG 7 and II./JG 54
- Conflicts: See battles World War II: Battle of France; Battle of Britain; Eastern Front; Defense of the Reich
- Awards: Knight's Cross of the Iron Cross with Oak Leaves and Swords
- Other work: airline pilot

Erich Rudorffer (1 November 1917 – 8 April 2016) was a German Luftwaffe fighter ace who was one of a handful who served with the Luftwaffe through the whole of World War II. He was one of the most successful fighter pilots in the history of air warfare, with 222 victories claimed. Rudorffer fought in all the major German theaters of war, including the European and Mediterranean Theater of Operations and the Eastern Front. During the war he flew more than 1000 combat missions, engaging in aerial combat over 300 times. Rudorffer was shot down by flak and enemy fighters 16 times and had to take to his parachute nine times.

== Early life ==
Rudorffer was born on 1 November 1917 in Zwochau, at the time in the Kingdom of Saxony of the German Empire. After graduation from school, he received a vocational education as an automobile metalsmith specialized in coachbuilding. He joined the military service of the Luftwaffe with Flieger-Ersatz-Abteilung 61 (Flier Replacement Unit 61) in Oschatz on 16 April 1936. From 2 September to 15 October 1936, he served with Kampfgeschwader 253 (KG 253—253rd Bomber Wing) and from 16 October 1936 to 24 February 1937 was trained as an aircraft engine mechanic at the Technische Schule Adlershof, the technical school at Adlershof in Berlin. (Note: For an explanation of Luftwaffe unit designations, see Organization of the Luftwaffe during World War II.) On 14 March 1937, Rudorffer was posted to Kampfgeschwader 153 (KG 153—153rd Bomber Wing), where he served as a mechanic until end October 1938. He was then transferred to Flieger-Ersatz-Abteilung 51 (Flier Replacement Unit 51) based at Liegnitz in Silesia, present-day Legnica in Poland, for flight training. There he was first trained as a bomber pilot and then as a Zerstörer, a heavy fighter or destroyer, pilot. According to Berger, Rudorffer then worked as an airline pilot for the Deutsche Luft Hansa.

On 1 October 1939, Rudorffer was transferred to the Jagdwaffe (fighter force) and was posted to the Jagdfliegerschule 2 (fighter pilot school) at Schleißheim. Following this conversion training, he was transferred to the Jagdergänzungsstaffel Döberitz, the supplementary fighter squadron based at Döberitz, on 6 December 1939. On 28 December 1939, he was transferred to the Ergänzungs-Jagdgruppe Merseburg, another supplementary training unit stationed at Merseburg, where newly trained fighter pilots received instruction from pilots with combat experience. He stayed there until 7 January 1940, one day later, Rudorffer, now an Oberfeldwebel (staff sergeant), was posted to the 2. Staffel (2nd squadron) of Jagdgeschwader 2 "Richthofen" (JG 2—2nd Fighter Wing), named after the World War I fighter ace Manfred von Richthofen. At the time, 2. Staffel was commanded by Oberleutnant Karl-Heinz Greisert and subordinated to I. Gruppe of JG 2 based at Frankfurt-Rebstock Airfield.

== World War II ==
On 10 May 1940, the first day of the Battle of France, I. Gruppe of JG 2 moved to an airfield at Kirchberg. Here, the Gruppe supported the advancing German armor of Army Group A crossing the Ardennes mountain range. On 14 May, I. Gruppe relocated to Bastogne, Belgium. That day, Rudorffer claimed his first aerial victory, a Curtiss Hawk 75 fighter. Following two further aerial victories claimed, he was awarded the Iron Cross 2nd Class (Eisernes Kreuz zweiter Klasse) on 22 May 1940. In total, he claimed nine aerial victories before the Armistice of 22 June 1940. He flew throughout the Battle of Britain, and it is claimed he was pursued down Croydon High Street below rooftop level by a Hawker Hurricane fighter. On 1 May 1941, Rudorffer was awarded the Knight's Cross of the Iron Cross (Ritterkreuz of the Iron Cross). At the time, he had claimed nineteen aerial victories and had flown 145 combat missions. On 19 May, Rudorffer and his wingman attacked a diving submarine off the Isle of Portland. It was observed that both bombs struck close and that the submarine went down vertically.

On 18 June 1941, II. Gruppe moved from Beaumont-le-Roger to Abbeville-Drucat where it stayed for the next six months. From this point on, the Gruppe defended against the RAF Fighter Command "non-stop offensive" over France. In July 1941, while flying with the Stab (headquarters unit) of JG 2, Rudorffer claimed six aerial victories. This figure includes two Spitfires on 7 July, a Spitfire and a Hurricane on 9 July, one Spitfire on 10 and 11 July each. He then served with 6. Staffel of JG 2 and claimed fifteen further aerial victories by the end of 1941, taking his total to 41. Rudorffer was appointed Staffelkapitän (squadron leader) of 6. Staffel of JG 2 on 1 November 1941, thus succeeding Oberleutnant Frank Liesendahl who was transferred. In March 1942, II. Gruppe began converting to the Focke-Wulf Fw 190 A-2. Conversion training was done in a round-robin system, Staffel by Staffel, at the Le Bourget Airfield near Paris. The conversion completed by end-April. From then on, the Gruppe was equipped with the Fw 190 A-2 and A-3 variant.

In 1942, Rudorffer participated in Operation Donnerkeil. The objective of this operation was to give the German battleships Scharnhorst and Gneisenau and the heavy cruiser Prinz Eugen fighter protection in the breakout from Brest to Germany. The Channel Dash operation (11–13 February 1942) by the Kriegsmarine was codenamed Operation Cerberus by the Germans. In support of this, the Luftwaffe, formulated an air superiority plan dubbed Operation Donnerkeil for the protection of the three German capital ships. During the Dieppe Raid on 19 August, Rudorffer claimed two Supermarine Spitfire fighters shot down north of Dieppe

=== Mediterranean Theater ===
In early November 1942, the Western Allies launched Operation Torch, the Anglo–American invasion of French North Africa. On 17 November, II. Gruppe of JG 2 was withdrawn from the English Channel Front and ordered to San Pietro Clarenza, Sicily. At the time, the Gruppe was equipped with the Fw 190 A-3, some Fw 190 A-2s, and received the A-4 variant in early December. This made II. Gruppe of JG 2 the only Fw 190 equipped fighter unit in the Mediterranean Theater. The Gruppe flew its first missions on 19 November, securing German air and sea transportation to Tunis. That day, elements of II. Gruppe began relocating to Bizerte Airfield. On 1 January 1943, Rudorffer was promoted to Hauptmann (captain).

On 8 January 1943, II. Gruppe moved to an airfield at Kairouan. On 9 February, Rudorffer claimed eight aerial victories during a 32-minute aerial battle, six Curtiss P-40 Warhawk and two Lockheed P-38 Lightning fighters, and for the first time became an "ace-in-a-day". On 15 February, he claimed seven aerial victories, four P-38s and three Spitfires. On 4 March, II. Gruppe of JG 2 received orders to relocate to France. On 17 April, Rudorffer was appointed Gruppenkommandeur (group commander) of II. Gruppe of JG 2. He replaced Hauptmann Adolf Dickfeld in this capacity who had been transferred to II. Gruppe of Jagdgeschwader 11 (JG 11—11th Fighter Wing). Consequently, command of 6. Staffel was passed to Leutnant Fritz Karch.

=== On the Eastern Front ===
On 30 June, Rudorffer was transferred again, tasked with the creation of a newly formed IV. Gruppe of Jagdgeschwader 54 (JG 54—54th Fighter Wing) on the Eastern Front. Command of II. Gruppe of JG 2 was handed over to Hauptmann Kurt Bühligen. The Gruppe was created at Jesau near Königsberg and planned for deployment in the combat area of Army Group North, roughly in the area south of Lake Ilmen, Leningrad and along the Volkhov. When on 30 July Hauptmann Heinrich Jung, the commander of II. Gruppe of JG 54 was killed in action, Rudorffer was again transferred, taking command of II. Gruppe on 1 August. Command of IV. Gruppe was temporarily assigned to Hauptmann Alfred Teumer before it officially was handed to Hauptmann Rudolf Sinner on 14 September.

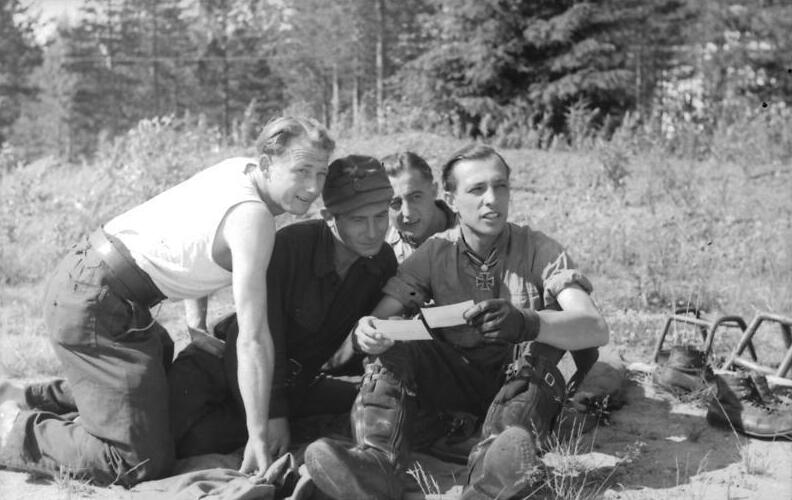
Rudorffer on 21 June 1944. In the background is his wingman, Unteroffizier Kurt Tangermann

In early August, II. Gruppe was based at Ziverskaya, located approximately 65 kilometers (40 miles) south-southwest of Leningrad. He claimed his first victory in that theater on 7 August. Due to the experience gained in combat with the Royal Air Force (RAF) he achieved considerable success. During his first sortie on 24 August 1943, 5 Soviet aircraft were downed in 4 minutes. On 11 October 1943, Rudorffer was also credited with his 100th aerial victory. He was the 55th Luftwaffe pilot to achieve this. In aerial combat near Teremky and Glychow, he claimed a Yak-7, his 100th victory, at 12:22, a LaGG-3 at 12:22, and three more Yak-7 shot down at 12:24, 12:25 and 12:27 respectively.

On 3 November, Soviet forces launched the strategic operation leading to the Battle of Kiev. Three days later, Rudorffer was credited with 13 aerial victories, eight Yak-7s and five Yak-9s from 13:00 to 13:17, taking his total to 122 aerial victories. On 1 January 1944, Rudorffer was promoted to Major (major), with a rank age dated 1 May 1944.

Rudorffer was awarded the Knight's Cross of the Iron Cross with Oak Leaves (Ritterkreuz des Eisernen Kreuzes mit Eichenlaub) on 11 April 1944, the 447th soldier to receive this distinction. The presentation was made by Adolf Hitler at the Berghof, Hitler's residence in the Obersalzberg of the Bavarian Alps, on 5 May 1944. Also present at the ceremony were Anton Hafner, Otto Kittel, Günther Schack, Emil Lang, Alfred Grislawski, Martin Möbus, Wilhelm Herget, Hans-Karl Stepp, Rudolf Schoenert, Günther Radusch, Otto Pollmann and Fritz Breithaupt, who all received the Oak Leaves on this date.

On 10 June, Soviet forces launched the Karelian offensive against Finland on the Karelian Isthmus as part of the Continuation War. In response to the Finnish ask for assistance, the Luftwaffe formed Gefechtsverband Kuhlmey (Detachment Kuhlmey) on 12 June, named after Oberstleutnant Kurt Kuhlmey, the commander of Schlachtgeschwader 3 (SG 3—3rd Combat Wing). Gefechtsverband Kuhlmey was made up of the Stab and I. Gruppe of SG 3, I. Gruppe of Schlachtgeschwader 5 (SG 5—5th Combat Wing), elements of Nahaufklärungsgruppe 5, a reconnaissance unit, and II. Gruppe of JG 54 under command of Rudorffer. Consequently, Gefechtsverband Kuhlmey moved to Immola Airfield on 17 June.

On 19 September, II. Gruppe began its relocation to Libau, present-day Liepāja, where they were based at an airfield named Grobin. During the Soviet Riga offensive, II. Gruppe moved to an airfield at Heiligenbeil, present-day Mamonovo, on 21 October. Here on 28 October, Rudorffer claimed eleven aerial victories, including his 200th aerial victory in total. On 26 January 1945, Rudorffer was awarded the Knight's Cross of the Iron Cross with Oak Leaves and Swords (Ritterkreuz des Eisernen Kreuzes mit Eichenlaub und Schwertern), the 126th presentation of the award, for 212 aerial victories claimed. (Note: According to Weal on 25 January 1945.)

=== Flying the Messerschmitt Me 262 ===
JG 7 "Nowotny" was the first operational jet fighter wing in the world and was named after Walter Nowotny, who was killed in action on 8 November 1944. Nowotny, a fighter pilot credited with 258 aerial victories and recipient of the Knight's Cross of the Iron Cross with Oak Leaves, Swords and Diamonds (Ritterkreuz des Eisernen Kreuzes mit Eichenlaub, Schwertern und Brillanten), had been assessing the Messerschmitt Me 262 jet aircraft under operational conditions. JG 7 "Nowotny" was equipped with the Me 262, an aircraft which was heavily armed and faster than any Allied fighter. General der Jagdflieger (General of the Fighter Force) Adolf Galland hoped that the Me 262 would compensate for the Allies' numerical superiority. On 12 November 1944, the Oberkommando der Luftwaffe (OKL—Air Force High Command) ordered JG 7 "Nowotny" to be equipped with the Me 262. Galland appointed Oberst Johannes Steinhoff as its first Geschwaderkommodore (wing commander).

In the winter of 1944 Rudorffer was trained on the Me 262 jet fighter. On 14 January 1945, he was recalled to command I. Gruppe JG 7 "Nowotny" from Major Theodor Weissenberger who replaced Steinhoff as Geschwaderkommodore. By 12 February, Rudorffer had twelve operational aircraft and every pilot had converted to the Me 262. Lacking was experience with close formation flying and low-level navigation using FuG 16 Z and FuG 25a. In early March, I. Gruppe was still based at Brandenburg-Briest. Rudorffer claimed ten heavy bombers flying the Me 262, (Note: For a list of Luftwaffe Jet aces see List of German World War II jet aces) seven of which were downed in April 1945.

== After the war ==
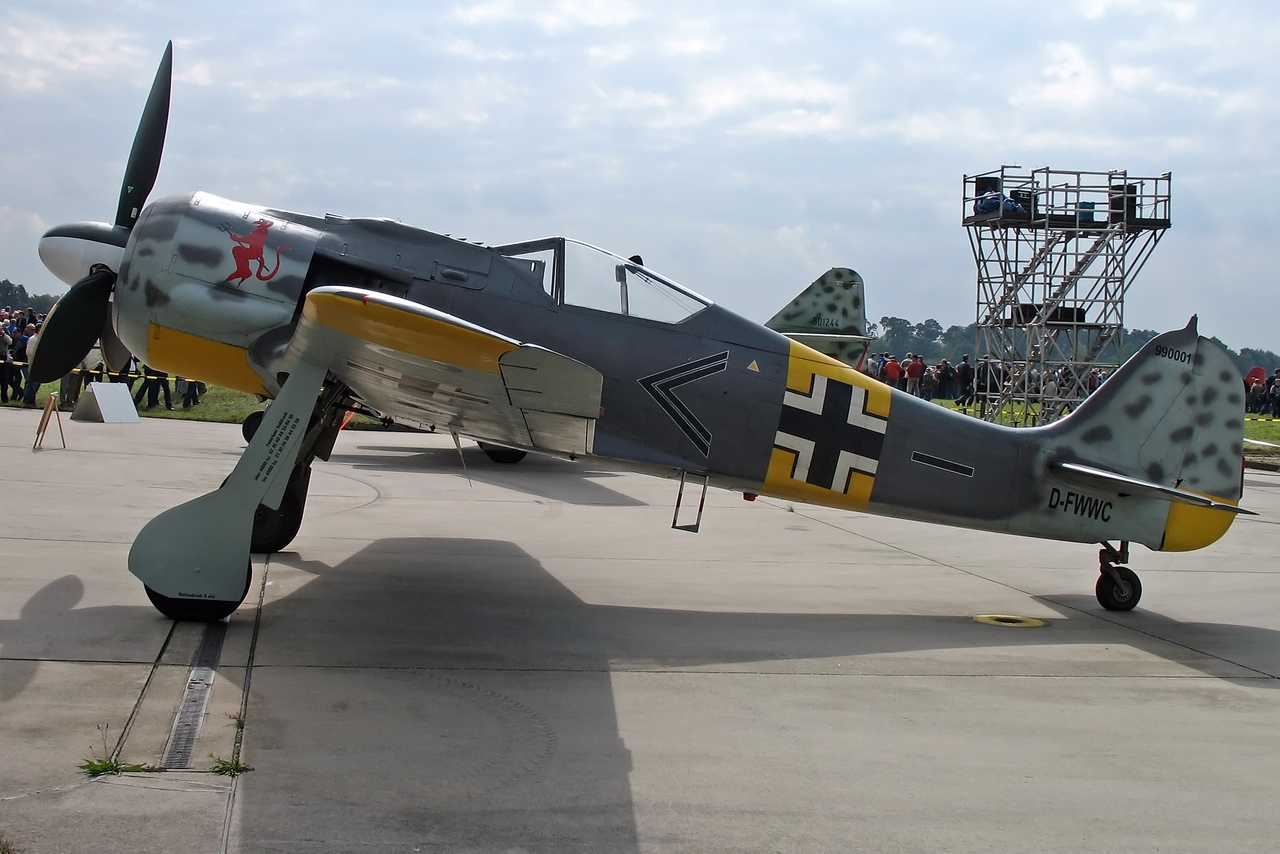
Fw 190 A8/N reproduction by Flug Werk GmbH Germany in the colors (minus the Swastika) and markings of Major Erich Rudorffer's mount of JG 54 when stationed at Immola, Finland.

Rudorffer started out flying DC-2s and DC-3s in Australia. Later on he worked for Pan Am and the Luftfahrt-Bundesamt, Germany's civil aviation authority. Rudorffer was one of the characters in the 2007 Finnish war movie Tali-Ihantala 1944. A Fw 190 participated, painted in the same markings as Rudorffer's aircraft in 1944. The aircraft, now based at Omaka Aerodrome in New Zealand, still wears the colours of Rudorffer's machine. Rudorffer died on 8 April 2016 at the age of 98 in Bad Schwartau, Germany. At the time of his death, he was the last living recipient of the Knight's Cross of the Iron Cross with Oak Leaves and Swords.

== Summary of career ==
=== Aerial victory claims ===
According to US historian David T. Zabecki, Rudorffer was credited with 224 aerial victories. Spick however lists him with 222 aerial victories, 136 of which claimed over the Eastern Front and 86 in the western theatre of operations, of which 26 were claimed over North Africa and 10 were heavy bombers, achieved in over 1,000 combat missions. Morgan and Weal list Rudorffer with 220 aerial victories of which 12 were claimed flying the Me 262 jet fighter. Mathews and Foreman, authors of Luftwaffe Aces — Biographies and Victory Claims, researched the German Federal Archives and found records for 219 aerial victory claims, plus two further unconfirmed claims. This figure of confirmed claims includes 134 aerial victories on the Eastern Front and 85 on the Western Front, including 11 four-engined heavy bombers and 12 victories with the Me 262 jet fighter.

Victory claims were logged to a map-reference (PQ = Planquadrat), for example "PQ 35 Ost 53224". The Luftwaffe grid map (Jägermeldenetz) covered all of Europe, western Russia and North Africa and was composed of rectangles measuring 15 minutes of latitude by 30 minutes of longitude, an area of about 360 square miles (930 km^{2}). These sectors were then subdivided into 36 smaller units to give a location area 3 km × 4 km (1.9 mi × 2.5 mi) in size.

Chronicle of aerial victories
This and the ♠ (Ace of spades) indicates those aerial victories which made Rudorffer an "ace-in-a-day", a term which designates a fighter pilot who has shot down five or more airplanes in a single day. This and the – (dash) indicates unconfirmed aerial victory claims for which Rudorffer did not receive credit. This and the ! (exclamation mark) indicates those aerial victories listed by Prien, Stemmer, Rodeike and Bock. This and the # (hash mark) indicates those aerial victories listed by Mathews and Foreman. This and the ? (question mark) indicates information discrepancies listed by Prien, Stemmer, Rodeike, Balke, Bock, Mathews and Foreman.
Claim!	Claim#	Date	Time	Type	Location	Claim!	Claim#	Date	Time	Type	Location
– 2. Staffel of Jagdgeschwader 2 –
1	1	14 May 1940	15:08? (Note: According to Mathews and Foreman claimed at 20:00.)	Curtiss	southwest of Les Sees la Quesne	11	11	11 August 1940	11:49	Spitfire	southeast of the Isle of Portland
2	2	17 May 1940	13:28	LeO 451	La Caponne	12	12	31 August 1940	09:40	Hurricane	Dover
3	3	19 May 1940	12:30? (Note: According to Mathews and Foreman claimed at 07:30.)	Morane 406	east of Guise	13	13	1 September 1940	12:45	Spitfire	Dover
4	4	25 May 1940	20:35	Blenheim	Saint-Quentin	14	14	2 September 1940	18:20	Hurricane	Faversham
5	5	26 May 1940	09:45? (Note: According to Mathews and Foreman claimed at 09:47.)	Spitfire	northwest of Calais	15	15	4 September 1940	09:58	Hurricane	Dover
6	6	26 May 1940	09:47? (Note: According to Mathews and Foreman claimed at 09:50.)	Spitfire	northwest of Calais	16	16	7 September 1940	18:30	Hurricane	Thames Estuary
7	7	6 June 1940	13:10	Curtiss	north of Soissons	17	17	7 September 1940	18:40	Spitfire	Thames Estuary
8	8	6 June 1940	20:45	Martin 167	Roye	18	18	7 September 1940	18:43	Spitfire	Thames Estuary
9	9	6 June 1940	20:50	LeO 451	north of Roye	19	—	10 October 1940	18:43? (Note: According to Mathews and Foreman claimed at 16:20.)	Spitfire	Isle of Portland
10	10	11 August 1940	11:38	Hurricane	east of Weymouth	20	19	21 April 1941	15:03	Blenheim	30 km (19 mi) north of Jersey
– Stab II. Gruppe of Jagdgeschwader 2 –
21	20	7 July 1941	15:35	Spitfire	east of Boulogne-sur-Mer	24	23	9 July 1941	13:45	Hurricane	northwest of Saint-Omer
22	21	7 July 1941	15:40	Spitfire	east of Boulogne-sur-Mer	25	24	10 July 1941	12:30? (Note: According to Mathews and Foreman claimed at 12:20.)	Spitfire	south of Desvres
23	22	9 July 1941	13:40	Spitfire	southwest of Saint-Omer	26	25	11 July 1941	15:00	Spitfire	north of Boulogne-sur-Mer
– 6. Staffel of Jagdgeschwader 2 –
27	26	19 July 1941	14:25	Spitfire	southeast of Calais	51	49	8 January 1943	15:40	P-51	55 km (34 mi) southwest of Kairouan
28	27	23 July 1941	13:18	Spitfire	west of Calais	52	50	18 January 1943	08:13? (Note: According to Mathews and Foreman claimed at 08:15.)	Spitfire	2 km (1.2 mi) southwest of Zeroud Estuary
29	—	5 August 1941	10:05	Spitfire	north of Gravelines	53	51	4 February 1943	16:19	Spitfire	5 km (3.1 mi) southwest of Ousseltia
30	28	5 August 1941	19:05	Spitfire	Dunkirk	54	52	4 February 1943	16:22	Spitfire	4 km (2.5 mi) south of Kef el Abiod
31	29	10 August 1941	14:15	Hurricane	northeast of Calais	55♠	53	9 February 1943	13:59	P-40	5 km (3.1 mi) south of Ousseltia
32	30	19 August 1941	11:59	Spitfire	Dover	56♠	54	9 February 1943	14:00	P-40	south of Ousseltia
33	31	19 August 1941	12:06	Spitfire	Dover	57♠	55	9 February 1943	14:01	P-40	Djebel Ousseltia
34	32	19 August 1941	12:15	Spitfire	Dover	58♠	56	9 February 1943	14:02	P-40	12 km (7.5 mi) northwest of Pichon
35	33	21 August 1941	15:10	Spitfire	Calais	59♠	57	9 February 1943	14:05	P-40	10 km (6.2 mi) southeast of Besra
36	34	20 September 1941	16:55	Spitfire	northeast of Dieppe	60♠	58	9 February 1943	14:06	P-40	15 km (9.3 mi) southeast of Besra
37	35	21 September 1941	16:50	Spitfire	English Channel	61♠	59	9 February 1943	14:21	P-38	5 km (3.1 mi) east Djebel Barbrou
38	36	21 September 1941	16:55? (Note: According to Mathews and Foreman claimed at 16:50.)	Spitfire	English Channel	62♠	60	9 February 1943	14:22	P-38	5 km (3.1 mi) west of Djebel Barbrou
39	37	21 September 1941	17:05	Spitfire	English Channel	63	61	14 February 1943	16:18	Spitfire	10 km (6.2 mi) west of Pichon
40	38	27 September 1941	15:40	Spitfire	Le Touquet	64♠		15 February 1943	14:58	P-38	4 km (2.5 mi) northwest of Pichon
41	39	8 December 1941	12:55	Hurricane	west of Boulogne-sur-Mer	65♠	62	15 February 1943	15:03	P-38	10 km (6.2 mi) northwest of Hajeb El Ayoun
42	40	3 June 1942	16:35	Spitfire	north of Le Havre	66♠	63	15 February 1943	15:07	P-38	10 km (6.2 mi) northeast of Sbeitla
43	41	3 June 1942	16:38	Spitfire	north of Le Havre	67♠	64	15 February 1943	15:08	P-38	8 km (5.0 mi) northeast of Sbeitla
44	42	5 June 1942	15:46	Spitfire	north of Le Havre	68♠	65	15 February 1943	15:15	Spitfire	northern edge of Djebel Abiod
45	43	19 August 1942	16:52	Spitfire	north of Dieppe	69♠	66	15 February 1943	15:16	Spitfire	northern edge of Djebel Abiod
46	44	19 August 1942	16:53	Spitfire	north of Dieppe	70♠	67	15 February 1943	15:18	Spitfire	northern edge of Djebel Abiod
47	45	18 December 1942	11:05	Spitfire	west of Mateur		68	15 February 1943	15:58	P-38	5 km (3.1 mi) northwest of Pichon
48	46	20 December 1942	16:48? (Note: According to Mathews and Foreman claimed at 16:40.)	Spitfire	5 km (3.1 mi) south of Béja	71	69 (Note: According to Mathews and Foreman, this victory was claimed with the Stab of II./Jagdgeschwader 2.)	11 March 1943	13:12	Spitfire	east of Ousseltia
49	47	8 January 1943	10:41	Boston	10 km (6.2 mi) south of Pichon	72	70	11 March 1943	13:13	Spitfire	east of Ousseltia
50	48	8 January 1943	15:35	P-38	50 km (31 mi) southwest of Kairouan	73	71	12 March 1943	14:25? (Note: According to Mathews and Foreman claimed at 14:28.)	B-17	10 km (6.2 mi) southeast of Makatar
– Stab II. Gruppe of Jagdgeschwader 2 –
74	72	15 May 1943	17:00	Spitfire? (Note: According to Mathews and Foreman claimed as a Hawker Typhoon.)	15 km (9.3 mi) northwest of Poix south of Senarpont	75	73	15 May 1943	17:10	Spitfire	10 km (6.2 mi) southeast of Dieppe west of Conterville
– Stab II. Gruppe of Jagdgeschwader 54 –
76		7 August 1943	14:38	Il-2	north of Karachev	145♠	140	3 July 1944	07:07	Il-2	PQ 26 Ost 81297, north-northwest of Tali; 20 km (12 mi) northwest of Vyborg
77		7 August 1943	14:41	Il-2	north of Karachev	146♠	141	3 July 1944	07:08	Il-2	PQ 26 Ost 81298, northeast of Tali; 20 km (12 mi) northwest of Vyborg
78	74	9 August 1943	17:57	Yak-4	PQ 35 Ost 53224, southeast of Nartschina; 20 km (12 mi) west of Oryol	147♠	142	3 July 1944	07:09	Il-2	PQ 26 Ost 81433, southeast of Tali; 10 km (6.2 mi) east of Vyborg
79	75	13 August 1943	16:12	Il-2	PQ 35 Ost 54781, southeast of Karachev	148♠	143	3 July 1944	07:10	Il-2	PQ 26 Ost 81434, east of Vyborg; 10 km (6.2 mi) east of Vyborg
80	76	13 August 1943	16:16	Il-2	PQ 35 Ost 54751, southeast of Karachev	149	144	25 July 1944	12:05	Yak-9	PQ 26 Ost 70696, east of Kärekonna; 15 km (9.3 mi) southwest of Narva
81♠	77	24 August 1943	07:08	DB-3	PQ 35 Ost 4447, south of Orgon	150♠	145	26 July 1944	16:42	Il-2	PQ 26 Ost 70631, north of Wusuowa; 20 km (12 mi) southwest of Narva
82♠	78	24 August 1943	07:12	DB-3	PQ 35 Ost 44523, west of Stajki	151♠	146	26 July 1944	16:43	Il-2	PQ 26 Ost 70696, south-southwest of Wusuowa; 20 km (12 mi) southwest of Narva
83♠	79	24 August 1943	07:15	Il-2	PQ 35 Ost 4461, south of Lipowo	152♠	147	26 July 1944	16:48	Il-2	PQ 26 Ost 70689, north-northwest of Kriwasoo; 30 km (19 mi) southwest of Narva
84♠	80	24 August 1943	14:40	La-5	PQ 35 Ost 4461, southeast of Djatkowo	153♠	148	26 July 1944	16:53	Il-2	PQ 26 Ost 70823, north-northwest of Wusuowa; 25 km (16 mi) southwest of Narva
85♠	81	24 August 1943	14:41	La-5	PQ 35 Ost 4461, southeast of Djatkowo	154♠	149	26 July 1944	17:08	Pe-2	PQ 26 Ost 60624, south-southwest of Wusuowa; Gulf of Finland
86♠	82	24 August 1943	14:42	La-5	PQ 35 Ost 4461, southeast of Djatkowo	155♠	150	26 July 1944	17:10	Pe-2	PQ 26 Ost 60816, west of Liiwa; Gulf of Finland
87♠	83	24 August 1943	14:43	La-5	PQ 35 Ost 4462, southeast of Djatkowo	156	151	27 July 1944	14:22	Il-2	PQ 25 Ost 78565, northwest of Liepna; 40 km (25 mi) northeast of Schwanenburg
88♠	84	24 August 1943	14:44	La-5	PQ 35 Ost 4462, southeast of Djatkowo	157	152	27 July 1944	14:25	Yak-9	PQ 25 Ost 78561, northwest of Liepna; 40 km (25 mi) northeast of Schwanenburg
89	85	26 August 1943	08:10	Yak-7	PQ 35 Ost 4343, southeast of Lokot	158	153	27 July 1944	14:28	Yak-9	PQ 25 Ost 78637, southwest of Eglitas; 25 km (16 mi) west-northwest of Ostrov
90	86	7 September 1943	17:35	Yak-7	PQ 35 Ost 4425, east of Ljudinowo	159	154	30 July 1944	11:24	Il-2	PQ 26 Ost 70668, southeast of Waiwara; 10 km (6.2 mi) west-southwest of Hungerburg
91♠	87	14 September 1943	16:41	Il-2	PQ 35 Ost 35542, east of Berissowo; 20 km (12 mi) south-southwest of Yelnya	160	155	30 July 1944	20:12	La-5	PQ 26 Ost 60479 vicinity of Kunda
92♠	88	14 September 1943	16:42	La-5	PQ 35 Ost 35541, east of Berissowo; 20 km (12 mi) south-southwest of Yelnya	161	156	6 August 1944	13:24	Il-2	PQ 25 Ost 79611, Lake Peipus
93♠	89	14 September 1943	16:44	La-5	PQ 35 Ost 35542, southeast of Schatkowo; 20 km (12 mi) south-southwest of Yelnya	162	157	6 August 1944	13:27	Il-2	PQ 26 Ost 79614, Lake Peipus
94♠	90	14 September 1943	16:45	La-5	PQ 35 Ost 35542, southeast of Schatkowo; 20 km (12 mi) south-southwest of Yelnya	163	158	17 August 1944	13:09	La-5	PQ 25 Ost 79819, north of Swabjuje; Lake Peipus
95♠	91	14 September 1943	16:46	Yak-7	PQ 35 Ost 35542, southwest of Schatkowo; 20 km (12 mi) south-southwest of Yelnya	164	159	17 August 1944	13:15	La-5	PQ 25 Ost 79588, north of Luiskolln west of Lake Peipus
96	92	15 September 1943	13:22	Il-2	PQ 35 Ost 25432, west-southwest of Yelnya; 20 km (12 mi) south-southwest of Yelnya	165	160	17 August 1944	13:20	La-5	PQ 25 Ost 79576, east-northeast of Fentute west of Lake Peipus
97		8 October 1943	08:30	Il-2	east of Borkij	166	161	23 August 1944	09:50	Il-2	PQ 25 Ost 57246, south of Ērgļi; 40 km (25 mi) southeast of Mālpils
98♠	93	11 October 1943	12:20	Yak-7	east of Teremky	167	162	23 August 1944	09:51	Yak-9	PQ 25 Ost 57249, south of Ērgļi; 40 km (25 mi) southeast of Mālpils
99♠	94	11 October 1943	12:21	Yak-7	west of Teremky	168♠	163	25 August 1944	13:45	Il-2	PQ 25 Ost 57284, southeast of Indrau; 35 km (22 mi) north-northwest of Kreuzburg
100♠	95	11 October 1943	12:22	Yak-7	south of Teremky	169♠	164	25 August 1944	13:46	Il-2	PQ 25 Ost 57283, southeast of Indrau; 35 km (22 mi) north-northwest of Kreuzburg
101♠	96	11 October 1943	12:22	LaGG-3	south of Teremky	170♠	165	25 August 1944	13:47	Il-2	PQ 25 Ost 57282, north of Indrau; 35 km (22 mi) north-northwest of Kreuzburg
102♠	97	11 October 1943	12:24	Yak-7	northwest of Glychow	171♠	166	25 August 1944	13:54	La-5	40 km (25 mi) north-northwest of Kreuzburg
103♠	98	11 October 1943	12:25	Yak-7	northwest of Glychow	172♠	167	25 August 1944	13:56	Il-2	PQ 25 Ost 57259, north of Indrau; 45 km (28 mi) east-southeast of Riga
104♠	99	11 October 1943	12:27	Yak-7	northeast of Teremky	173	168	5 September 1944	18:56	Yak-9	PQ 25 Ost 69616, south-southwest of Kärkne northwest of Dorpat
105	100	22 October 1943	06:35	La-5	west of Trachtemirow	174	169	6 September 1944	12:59	La-5	PQ 25 Ost 79555, south of Kastre west of Lake Peipus
106	101	22 October 1943	06:38	Yak-7	west of Trachtemirow	175	170	6 September 1944	13:01	La-5	PQ 25 Ost 79554, southeast of Kastre west of Lake Peipus
107	102	2 November 1943	15:16	Yak-9	PQ 35 Ost 01414; Lake Ladoga	176	171	6 September 1944	13:03	La-5	PQ 25 Ost 79554, southeast of Kastre west of Lake Peipus
108	103	2 November 1943	15:18	Yak-9	PQ 35 Ost 01414; Lake Ladoga	177	172	6 September 1944	13:04	La-5	PQ 25 Ost 79554, southeast of Kastre west of Lake Peipus
109♠	104	6 November 1943	07:18	Il-2	PQ 35 Ost 01811; 30 km (19 mi) northeast of Leningrad	178	173	17 September 1944	13:51	Il-2	PQ 25 Ost 69777, east-northeast of Tõrva; 25 km (16 mi) north of Walk
110♠	105	6 November 1943	13:00	Yak-7	PQ 35 Ost 01582; 40 km (25 mi) east-northeast of Zelenogorsk	179	174	17 September 1944	13:52	Il-2	PQ 25 Ost 69775, southeast of Tõrva vicinitz of Lake Wirz
111♠	106	6 November 1943	13:01	Yak-7	PQ 35 Ost 01583; 40 km (25 mi) east-northeast of Zelenogorsk	180	175	17 September 1944	13:57	Il-2	PQ 25 Ost 58333, northeast of Rencēni; 15 km (9.3 mi) north of Wolmar
112♠	107	6 November 1943	13:03	Yak-7	PQ 35 Ost 01583; 40 km (25 mi) east-northeast of Zelenogorsk	181	176	20 September 1944	11:39	Il-2	PQ 25 Ost 69164, southeast of Kolnoere; 40 km (25 mi) east of Weissenstein
113♠	108	6 November 1943	13:04	Yak-7	PQ 35 Ost 01554; 40 km (25 mi) northeast of Zelenogorsk	182♠	177	25 September 1944	10:21	Yak-3	PQ 25 Ost 37125, southeast of Tukkum vicinity of Tukkum
114♠	109	6 November 1943	13:05	Yak-9	PQ 35 Ost 01554; 40 km (25 mi) northeast of Zelenogorsk	183♠	178	25 September 1944	10:23	Yak-3? (Note: According to Mathews and Foreman claimed as an Ilyushin Il-2.)	PQ 25 Ost 37126, east-southeast of Tukkum vicinity of Tukkum
115♠	110	6 November 1943	13:07	Yak-9	PQ 35 Ost 01582; 40 km (25 mi) east-northeast of Zelenogorsk	184♠	179	25 September 1944	10:31	Il-2? (Note: According to Mathews and Foreman claimed as a Yakovlev Yak-3.)	PQ 25 Ost 37137, south of Tukkum; 15 km (9.3 mi) east of Tukkum
116♠	111	6 November 1943	13:08	Yak-9	PQ 35 Ost 01554; 40 km (25 mi) northeast of Zelenogorsk	185♠	180	25 September 1944	10:32	Il-2	PQ 25 Ost 37128, south-southeast of Tukkum vicinity of Tukkum
117♠	112	6 November 1943	13:09	Yak-9	PQ 35 Ost 01554; 40 km (25 mi) northeast of Zelenogorsk	186♠	181	25 September 1944	10:33? (Note: According to Mathews and Foreman claimed at 10:32.)	Il-2	PQ 25 Ost 37151, south of Saliniki; 15 km (9.3 mi) east of Tukkum
118♠	113	6 November 1943	13:11	Yak-7	PQ 35 Ost 01591; 45 km (28 mi) east-northeast of Zelenogorsk	187♠	182	25 September 1944	10:35	Il-2	PQ 25 Ost 37155, south of Saliniki; 15 km (9.3 mi) east of Tukkum
119♠	114	6 November 1943	13:12	Yak-7	PQ 35 Ost 01591; 45 km (28 mi) east-northeast of Zelenogorsk	188♠	183	10 October 1944	10:12	P-39	PQ 25 Ost 17516, south of Otanki; 10 km (6.2 mi) south of Libau
120♠	115	6 November 1943	13:13	Yak-7	PQ 35 Ost 01594; 45 km (28 mi) east-northeast of Zelenogorsk	189♠	184	10 October 1944	10:14	P-39	PQ 25 Ost 17524, southwest of Tilti; 15 km (9.3 mi) southeast of Libau
121♠	116	6 November 1943	13:15	Yak-7	PQ 35 Ost 01592; 45 km (28 mi) east-northeast of Zelenogorsk	190♠	185	10 October 1944	10:17	Pe-2	PQ 25 Ost 17553, northeast of Burgeli; 20 km (12 mi) southeast of Libau
122♠	117	6 November 1943	13:17	Yak-7	PQ 35 Ost 01722; 25 km (16 mi) north of Leningrad	191♠	186	10 October 1944	10:18	Pe-2	PQ 25 Ost 17563, north of Kalvini; 25 km (16 mi) southeast of Libau
123	118	10 December 1943	14:06	Il-2	northeast of Grebenki	192♠	187	10 October 1944	10:19	Pe-2	PQ 25 Ost 17645, southwest of Trekni; 30 km (19 mi) southeast of Libau
124	119	11 February 1944	14:30	Yak-7	PQ 36 Ost 10741, northwest of Tarassowka; 30 km (19 mi) south-southwest of Luban	193♠	188	10 October 1944	10:20? (Note: According to Mathews and Foreman claimed at 10:30.)	Pe-2	PQ 25 Ost 17658, west of Liepieni; 45 km (28 mi) southeast of Libau
125	120	19 March 1944	09:08	LaGG-3	PQ 25 Ost 88352, east of Priborok; 10 km (6.2 mi) south of Pskov	194♠	189	10 October 1944	10:24	P-39	PQ 25 Ost 17641, northeast of Purmati; 30 km (19 mi) southeast of Libau
126	121	29 March 1944	09:03	Il-2	PQ 26 Ost 70691, north of Kärekonna; 15 km (9.3 mi) southwest of Narva	195	190	22 October 1944	14:20	Pe-2	PQ 25 Ost 17557, northeast of Kramenti; 20 km (12 mi) southeast of Libau
127	122	3 April 1944	08:32	Yak-9	PQ 25 Ost 88392, south of Jukanowo; 10 km (6.2 mi) southeast of Selo	196	191	22 October 1944	14:21	Pe-2	PQ 25 Ost 17852, north of Liepieni; 25 km (16 mi) south-southeast of Libau
128♠	123	7 April 1944	07:42	Il-2	PQ 25 Ost 88361, south of Sentowo; 20 km (12 mi) southwest of Selo	197	192	22 October 1944	14:24	P-39	PQ 25 Ost 17559, northwest of Kasteri; 20 km (12 mi) southeast of Libau
129♠	124	7 April 1944	07:48	Il-2	PQ 25 Ost 88362, east of Kirjakowo; 20 km (12 mi) southwest of Selo	198	193	22 October 1944	14:25	P-39	PQ 25 Ost 17564, west of Aorti; 20 km (12 mi) southeast of Libau
130♠	125	7 April 1944	07:49	Il-2	PQ 25 Ost 88392, south of Wessno; 10 km (6.2 mi) southeast of Selo	199♠	194	28 October 1944	11:46	Il-2	PQ 25 Ost 07632, southwest of Libau
131♠	126	7 April 1944	07:52	Il-2	PQ 25 Ost 88393, south of Walki; 20 km (12 mi) southwest of Selo	200♠	195	28 October 1944	11:47	Il-2	PQ 25 Ost 07635, southwest of Libau
132♠	127	7 April 1944	07:56	Yak-9	PQ 25 Ost 88363, north of Korsuli; 25 km (16 mi) southeast of Pskov	201♠	196	28 October 1944	11:48	Il-2	PQ 25 Ost 07661, southwest of Libau
133♠	128	7 April 1944	07:58	Yak-9	PQ 25 Ost 88442, south of Kokorina; 25 km (16 mi) southeast of Pskov	202♠	197	28 October 1944	11:49	Il-2	PQ 25 Ost 07662, southwest of Libau
134	129	28 April 1944	17:55? (Note: According to Mathews and Foreman claimed at 17:56.)	Il-2	PQ 25 Ost 87836, northwest of Ozero Liva (Lake Liva); 15 km (9.3 mi) south of Idritsa	203♠	198	28 October 1944	11:50	Il-2	PQ 25 Ost 07667, southwest of Libau
135	130	28 April 1944	17:57	Il-2	PQ 25 Ost 87839, northwest of Ozero Liva (Lake Liva); 15 km (9.3 mi) south of Idritsa	204♠	199	28 October 1944	11:52	Il-2	PQ 25 Ost 07641, southwest of Libau
136	131	28 April 1944	17:59	Yak-9?	north-northeast of Ozero Liva (Lake Liva)	205♠	200	28 October 1944	11:53	Il-2	PQ 25 Ost 07668, south of Libau
137	132	17 June 1944	11:25	Pe-2	PQ 26 Ost 81262, north-northeast of Vyborg; 30 km (19 mi) northwest of Vyborg	206♠	201	28 October 1944	11:54	Il-2	PQ 25 Ost 07683, southwest of Libau; 15 km (9.3 mi) east-southeast of Velikiye Luki
138	133	18 June 1944	08:35	Il-2	PQ 26 Ost 91581, southeast of Kaukjärvi; 25 km (16 mi) northwest of Zelenogorsk	207♠	202	28 October 1944	11:56	Il-2	PQ 25 Ost 07664, southwest of Libau; 15 km (9.3 mi) east-southeast of Velikiye Luki
139	134	18 June 1944	08:36	Il-2	PQ 26 Ost 91557, southeast of Kaukjärvi; 25 km (16 mi) northwest of Zelenogorsk	208♠	203	28 October 1944	15:01	Il-2	PQ 25 Ost 17619, southeast of Preekuln; 40 km (25 mi) east-southeast of Libau
140	135	19 June 1944	15:00	Il-2	PQ 26 Ost 91176, south of Leipasseno; 30 km (19 mi) south-southeast of Vyborg	209♠	204	28 October 1944	15:03	Il-2	PQ 25 Ost 17624, Warki; 45 km (28 mi) east-southeast of Libau
141	136	20 June 1944	16:32	Il-2	PQ 26 Ost 81456, south of Vyborg; 10 km (6.2 mi) south of Vyborg	210	205	30 October 1944	12:05	Boston	PQ 25 Ost 07613, west of Libau
142	137	20 June 1944	16:34	Il-2	PQ 26 Ost 81462, southeast of Sainio; 10 km (6.2 mi) southeast of Vyborg	211	206	30 October 1944	12:07	Boston	PQ 25 Ost 07611, southwest of Libau
143	138	20 June 1944	16:36	P-39	PQ 26 Ost 81466, southeast of Sainio; 10 km (6.2 mi) southeast of Vyborg	212	207	5 November 1944	09:51	Yak-11	Preekuln
144♠	139	3 July 1944	07:06	Il-2	PQ 26 Ost 81294, north of Tali; 20 km (12 mi) northwest of Vyborg						
– Stab I. Gruppe of Jagdgeschwader 7 –
According to Mathews and Foreman, Rudorffer had twelve confirmed victories flying the Me 262.
?	?	24 March 1945	—	Tempest		?	?	30 March 1945	—	P-51	vicinity of Hamburg
?	?	25 March 1945	—	B-17		?	?	30 March 1945	—	P-51	vicinity of Hamburg

=== Awards ===
- Wound Badge in Black
- Honor Goblet of the Luftwaffe
- Front Flying Clasp of the Luftwaffe in Gold with Pennant "1000"
- Combined Pilots-Observation Badge
- Finnish Order of the Cross of Liberty (2nd class)
- German Cross in Gold on 9 December 1941 as Leutnant in the 2./JG 2
- Iron Cross (1939)
  - 2nd Class (22 May 1940)
  - 1st Class (28 June 1940)
- Knight's Cross of the Iron Cross with Oak Leaves and Swords
  - Knight's Cross on 1 May 1941 as Leutnant and pilot in the 6./Jagdgeschwader 2 "Richthofen"
  - 447th Oak Leaves on 11 April 1944 as Major and Gruppenkommandeur of the II./Jagdgeschwader 54 (Note: According to Scherzer as Hauptmann (war officer) and not Major.)
  - 126th Swords on 26 January 1945 as Major (war officer) and Gruppenkommandeur of the II./Jagdgeschwader 54

=== Dates of rank ===
28 October 1940:	Leutnant (Second Lieutenant), effective as of 1 November 1940
20 November 1941:	Oberleutnant (First Lieutenant), with a rank age dated 1 October 1941
1 January 1943:	Hauptmann (Captain)
1 January 1944:	Major (Major), with a rank age dated 1 May 1944
