= Wilhelm Herget =

German World War II fighter pilot

- Born: 30 June 1910; Stuttgart, Kingdom of Württemberg, German Empire
- Died: 27 March 1974 (aged 63); Stuttgart, West Germany
- Military career
- Allegiance: Nazi Germany
- Branch: Luftwaffe
- Service years: 1939–1945
- Rank: Major (major)
- Nickname: Der Kleine
- Units: ZG 76, NJG 3, NJG 1, NJG 4, JV 44
- Commands: I./NJG 4
- Conflicts: See battles World War II: Invasion of Poland; Battle of France; Battle of Britain; Anglo-Iraqi War; Defense of the Reich
- Awards: Knight's Cross of the Iron Cross with Oak Leaves
- Other work: Publisher

Wilhelm Herget (30 June 1910 – 27 March 1974) was a German Luftwaffe military aviator during World War II, a night fighter ace credited with 73—15 daytime and 58 nighttime—enemy aircraft shot down in over 700 combat missions. The majority of his victories were claimed over the Western Front in Defense of the Reich missions against the Royal Air Force's Bomber Command.

Born in Stuttgart, Herget grew up in the grew up in the German Empire, Weimar Republic and Nazi Germany. Following graduation from school and a vocational education in printing, he joined the military service in the Luftwaffe. Herget flew his first combat missions in the 1939 Invasion of Poland and in 1940, in the Battle of France and Britain. In May 1941, he participated in the Anglo-Iraqi War. In November 1941, Herget transferred to the night fighter force, initially serving with Nachtjagdgeschwader 1 (NJG 1—1st Night Fighter Wing). In September 1942, Herget became group commander of I. Gruppe (1st group) of Nachtjagdgeschwader 4 (NJG 4—4th Night Fighter Wing), a position he held until December 1944. Following his 63rd aerial victory, he was awarded the Knight's Cross of the Iron Cross with Oak Leaves on 11 April 1944. The Knight's Cross (German: Ritterkreuz), and its variants were the highest awards in the military and paramilitary forces of Nazi Germany during World War II. Herget flew his last combat missions with Jagdverband 44 (JV 44—44th Fighter Detachment), a Messerschmitt Me 262 jet fighter unit, in 1945. After the war, he worked in publishing. Herget died on 27 March 1974 in Stuttgart.

== Early life and career ==
Herget was born on 30 June 1910 in Stuttgart in the Kingdom of Württemberg of the German Empire, the son of a printer. After graduation from school, he learned the trade of printing and completed his Meister (master craftsman) training. Herget also served in the Sturmabteilung (SA) as Rottenführer (section leader). In parallel, he served in the military reserve force with an Aufklärungsgruppe (aerial reconnaissance group). In August 1939, Herget was posted to 6. Staffel (6th squadron) of Zerstörergeschwader 76 (ZG 76—76th Destroyer Wing) flying a Messerschmitt Bf 110 heavy fighter.

== World War II ==
On Friday 1 September 1939, German forces invaded Poland starting World War II in Europe. Herget flew his first combat mission with ZG 76 during the invasion and was promoted to Leutnant der Reserve (second lieutenant of the reserves) on 25 October 1939. In May 1940, he fought in the Battle of France and later that year in the Battle of Britain. Herget, due to his short built, had to fly a customized Bf 110 with wooden blocks attached to the rudder pedals in order to reach them. He claimed three Supermarine Spitfire fighters shot down in May 1940 and a Curtiss P-36 Hawk fighter in June and was awarded the Iron Cross 2nd Class (Eisernes Kreuz zweiter Klasse). On 30 August 1940, Herget claimed a Hawker Hurricane and a Spitfire on the next day. On 1 September, he claimed three further Spitfires and another on 2 September. In May 1941, Herget was transferred to Sonderkommando Junck, also referred to as Fliegerführer Irak, a Luftwaffe task force under the command of Oberst (Colonel) Werner Junck which participated in the Anglo-Iraqi War.

=== Night fighter career ===
Herget was promoted to Oberleutnant der Reserve (first lieutenant of the reserves) on 1 November 1941 and transferred to the night fighter force. There he was posted to 7. Staffel (7th squadron) of Nachtjagdgeschwader 3 (NJG 3—3rd Night Fighter Wing). On 15 January 1942, 7./NJG 3 was redesignated and became the 4. Staffel (4th squadron) of Nachtjagdgeschwader 1 (NJG 1—1st Night Fighter Wing). Herget was awarded the German Cross in Gold (Deutsches Kreuz in Gold) on 7 February 1942. Herget claimed his first nocturnal victory on the night of 5/6 April 1942.

On 1 May 1942, Herget was appointed Staffelkapitän (squadron leader) of 9. Staffel (9th squadron) of Nachtjagdgeschwader 4 (NJG 4—4th Night Fighter Wing) and promoted to Hauptmann der Reserve (captain of the reserves) on 1 October 1942. On 1 September 1942, he had been appointed Gruppenkommandeur (group commander) of the newly reformed I. Gruppe of NJG 4 and served in this position until December 1944. Herget received the Knight's Cross of the Iron Cross (Ritterkreuz des Eisernen Kreuzes) on 20 June 1943 for 31 aerial victories and the destruction of five ground targets. The presentation was made by General der Flieger (lieutenant general) Josef Kammhuber.

Herget was promoted to Major der Reserve (major of the reserves) on 1 October 1943. On the night of 20/21 December 1943, Herget was credited with the destruction of five Halifax and three Lancaster bombers within 45 minutes, making him an "ace-in-a-day". Following his 63rd aerial victory, Herget was awarded the Knight's Cross of the Iron Cross with Oak Leaves (Ritterkreuz des Eisernen Kreuzes mit Eichenlaub) on 11 April 1944, the 451st soldier to receive this distinction. The presentation was made by Adolf Hitler at the Berghof, Hitler's residence in the Obersalzberg of the Bavarian Alps, on 5 May 1944. Also present at the ceremony were Anton Hafner, Otto Kittel, Günther Schack, Emil Lang, Alfred Grislawski, Erich Rudorffer, Martin Möbus, Hans-Karl Stepp, Rudolf Schoenert, Günther Radusch, Otto Pollmann and Fritz Breithaupt, who all received the Oak Leaves on this date.

On 15 June 1944 he was shot down by British ace Branse Burbridge. Herget and his crew bailed out and the Junkers Ju 88 G-1 (Werknummer—factory number 710833) crashed south-west of Nivelles. The crash site was initially excavated in the summer of 2008. According to Boiten and Obermaier, Herget claimed his last aerial victory as a night fighter, a de Havilland Mosquito fighter-bomber, on the night 14/15 June 1944. This claim is not documented by Foreman, Mathews and Parry, authors of Luftwaffe Night Fighter Claims 1939 – 1945.

=== Messerschmitt Me 262 and Jagdverband 44 ===
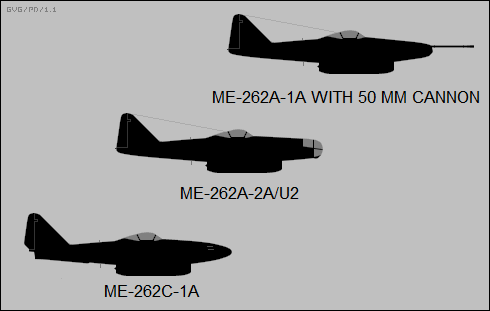
Me 262 variants: • the A-1a/U4 • the A-2a/U2 • the C-1a

In January 1945, Herget underwent conversion training and learned to fly the then new Messerschmitt Me 262 jet fighter. He then served with Sonderkommission Kleinrath, a specialized task force named after Generalleutnant (Lieutenant General) Kurt Kleinrath. This task force of the Reichsluftfahrtministerium (RLM—Ministry of Aviation) main objective was to optimize test-flying and delivery schedules of newly manufactured aircraft. In this function, Herget was involved in improving production of the Me 262 and was subsequently exposed to the slave labor system employed by the various Messerschmitt factories and subcontractors. Herget pointed out that aircraft manufacturing based on slave labor was counterproductive. News of his analysis reached Reichsmarschall (Marshal of the Reich) Hermann Göring who forbade him to visit another factory.

On 5 April 1945, Herget began testing a prototype variant of the Me 262 at Lechfeld, the Messerschmitt test airfield. The Me 262A-1a/U4 which Herget tested was equipped with an adapted 50 mm (1.969 in) MK 214 long barreled cannon. It was believed that this weapon could bring down enemy bombers from outside their defensive firing range. The weapon system suffered from technical problems and was prone to jamming. On 16 April, Herget flew the Me 262A-1a/U4 in an unsuccessful combat mission against a United States Army Air Forces (USAAF) bomber formation. The weapon failed and no shot was fired. The Me 262 was then flown to Munich-Riem by Herget where it was placed under the control of Adolf Galland's Jagdverband 44 (JV 44—44th Fighter Detachment).

Herget's last missions of World War II were flown with JV 44. On 27 April, Herget, accompanied by Oberstleutnant (Lieutenant Colonel) Heinrich Bär and Unteroffizier Franz Köster, engaged USSAF fighters near the Munich-Riem airfield and claimed his only aerial victory flying the Me 262, a Republic P-47 Thunderbolt, and last of the war. During the final days of the World War II in Europe, Galland who had been injured in combat on 26 April, attempted to surrender JV 44 to American forces from his hospital bed. On 1 May 1945, Galland instructed Herget to fly to Oberschleißheim, which had already fallen into US hands, and negotiate the terms of surrender. At dawn, Herget and Hauptmann Hugo Kessler, Galland's aide, flew to Oberschleißheim in a Fieseler Fi 156 "Storch". The Americans then drove the two Germans to the command post of the US 45th Infantry Division in the vicinity of Feldmoching. There they met with General Pearson Menoher, Chief-of-Staff of the XV Corps, General Jesse D. Auton, commander of the 65th Fighter Wing, and Colonel Dorr E. Newton, commander of XII Tactical Air Command. Herget handed over a letter from Galland which advocated the idea of surrendering a fully operational jet fighter unit to the Americans.

== Later life ==
Herget died on 27 March 1974 at the age of 63 in Stuttgart, West Germany. According to Mathews and Foreman, authors of Luftwaffe Aces — Biographies and Victory Claims, he had committed suicide following a failed business undertaking.

== Summary of career ==
=== Aerial victory claims ===
According to US historian David T. Zabecki, Herget was credited with 73 aerial victories. Obermaier also lists him with 73—15 daytime and 58 nighttime—aerial victories, claimed in over 700 combat missions. His 15 daytime claims includes one aerial victory flying the Me 262 jet fighter. Victory claims were logged to a map-reference (PQ = Planquadrat), for example "PQ 2417". The Luftwaffe grid map covered all of Europe, western Russia and North Africa and was composed of rectangles measuring 15 minutes of latitude by 30 minutes of longitude, an area of about 360 square miles (930 km^{2}). These sectors were then subdivided into 36 smaller units to give a location area 3 km × 4 km (1.9 mi × 2.5 mi) in size.

Chronicle of aerial victories
This and the ♠ (Ace of spades) indicates those aerial victories that made Herget an "ace-in-a-day", a fighter pilot who has shot down five or more airplanes in a single day.
Claim (total)	Claim (nocturnal)	Date	Time	Type	Location	Serial No./Squadron No.
– 6. Staffel of Zerstörergeschwader 76 –
1		25 May 1940	16:50	Spitfire		
2		29 May 1940	14:00	Spitfire	west of Dunkirk	
3		18 June 1940	07:05	Hawk 75	southeast of Cherbourg	
4		30 August 1940	12:30	Hurricane		
5		30 August 1940	12:45	Hurricane		
6		31 August 1940	09:50	Spitfire		
7		1 September 1940	14:45	Spitfire	Tunbridge	
8		1 September 1940	14:50	Spitfire	Tunbridge	
9		1 September 1940	15:00	Spitfire	Tunbridge	
10		2 September 1940	17:30	Spitfire	London	
11		4 September 1940	14:20	Spitfire	Tunbridge	
12		11 September 1940	17:00	Hurricane	5–10 km (3.1–6.2 mi) east of the Isle of Wight	
13		4 July 1941	05:05	Handley	PQ 2417	
14		30 July 1941	17:00	Blenheim	off Texel	No. 139 Squadron RAF
– 4. Staffel of Nachtjagdgeschwader 1 –
15	1	6 April 1942	02:10	Hereford	2 km (1.2 mi) west of Roly-Neuville	Hampden AT156/No. 49 Squadron RAF
– Stab II. Gruppe of Nachtjagdgeschwader 4 –
16	2	6/7 May 1942		Halifax	10 km (6.2 mi) southwest of Saint-Hubert	
– 9. Staffel of Nachtjagdgeschwader 4 –
17	3	20 May 1942	01:09	Halifax	northwest of Saint-Hubert	Halifax W7660/No. 76 Squadron RAF
18	4	17 June 1942	02:14	Stirling	west of Limont-Fontaine	Stirling R9324/No. 7 Squadron RAF
19	5	25 August 1942	02:15	Wellington	2 km (1.2 mi) southwest of Marly	
20	6	28 August 1942	23:04	Halifax	Dinant	Halifax BB204/No. 103 Squadron RAF
21	7	28 August 1942	23:22	Hampden	northwest of Philippeville	
22	8	2 September 1942	03:30	Halifax	5 km (3.1 mi) south of Diksmuide	Halifax W1244/No. 76 Squadron RAF
23	9	20 September 1942	01:15	Wellington	20 km (12 mi) north of Reims	
24	10	20 September 1942	03:28	Lancaster	west of Berlaimont	Lancaster R5554/No. 44 Squadron RAF
– Stab I. Gruppe of Nachtjagdgeschwader 4 –
25	11	22 November 1942	20:46	Wellington	north of Laon	Wellington BK206/No. 115 Squadron RAF
26	12	21 December 1942	23:30	Lancaster	1 km (0.62 mi) west of Steenbuyne	Lancaster W4234/No. 57 Squadron RAF
27	13	11 April 1943	03:23	Wellington	Nivelles	Wellington HE652/No. 426 (Thunderbird) Squadron RCAF
28	14	11 April 1943	03:55	Wellington	1 km (0.62 mi) south of Le Havre	Wellington BK459/No. 166 Squadron RAF
29	15	17 April 1943	04:06	Halifax	Rance	Halifax HR663/No. 102 Squadron RAF
30	16	17 April 1943	04:23	Lancaster	Villers-Deux-Églises	Lancaster ED800/No. 50 Squadron RAF
– 3. Staffel of Nachtjagdgeschwader 1 –
31	17	15 June 1943	01:55	Lancaster	1 km (0.62 mi) north of Oijen	Lancaster LM329/No. 9 Squadron RAF
32	18	22 June 1943	01:27	Lancaster	2 km (1.2 mi) south of Asten	Lancaster EE198/No. 619 Squadron RAF
33	19	22 June 1943	01:38	Wellington	20 km (12 mi) west-southwest of Venlo	Wellington HE924/No. 166 Squadron RAF
34	20	22 June 1943	02:15	Lancaster	Leitler-Heide	Lancaster W4939/No. 460 Squadron RAAF
35	21	23 June 1943	02:01	Halifax	1 km (0.62 mi) northwest of Vechel	Halifax JB855/No. 78 Squadron RAF
36	22	29 June 1943	01:30	Lancaster	1.5 km (0.93 mi) southwest of Roermond	Lancaster ED363/No. 467 Squadron RAAF
– Stab I. Gruppe of Nachtjagdgeschwader 4 –
37	23	4 July 1943	02:23	Wellington	Solre-sur-Sambre	Wellington HZ478/No. 196 Squadron RAF
38	24	14 July 1943	02:35	Wellington	northwest of Givet	
39	25	14 July 1943	02:40	Halifax	northeast of Givet	
40	26	24 August 1943	01:23	Lancaster	1 km (0.62 mi) southeast of Thomsdorf	
41	27	28 August 1943	01:50	Halifax	Nuremberg	
42	28	1 September 1943	00:56	Halifax	southwest of Trebbin	
43	29	1 September 1943	01:11	Lancaster	northeast of Trebbin	
44	30	4 October 1943	20:49	Halifax	Givet	
45	31	4 October 1943	21:30	Halifax	west-northwest of Neufchâteau	
46	32	4 October 1943	22:08	B-17	Friedberg	B-17 42-3091/95th Bombardment Group
47	33	26 November 1943	03:35	Halifax	4 km (2.5 mi) east of St. Vith	Halifax LW326/No. 35 Squadron RAF
48	34	26 November 1943	19:40	Lancaster	east-southeast of Trier	
49	35	26 November 1943	20:06	Lancaster	northeast of Frankfurt am Main	Lancaster JB458/No. 103 Squadron RAF
50	36	26 November 1943	20:08	Lancaster	northeast of Frankfurt am Main	Lancaster DV289/No. 101 Squadron RAF
51	37	2 December 1943	20:29	Stirling	Berlin	
52	38	2 December 1943	20:55	Stirling	Berlin	
53	39♠	20 December 1943	19:27	Halifax	Münstermaifeld	
54	40♠	20 December 1943	19:35	Halifax	Wiesenheim	
55	41♠	20 December 1943	19:37	Halifax	Flörsheim am Main	
56	42♠	20 December 1943	19:43	four-engined bomber	12 km (7.5 mi) west-southwest of Frankfurt am Main	
57	43♠	20 December 1943	19:47	Lancaster	northeast of Hanau	
58	44♠	20 December 1943	19:57	Halifax	Hanau	
59	45♠	20 December 1943	20:00	Lancaster	Rossdorf	
60	46♠	20 December 1943	20:15	Lancaster	west of Schwalbach am Taunus	Lancaster DS817/No. 514 Squadron RAF
61	47	2 January 1944	05:46	Lancaster	Grandrieux	Lancaster DV308/No. 207 Squadron RAF
62	48	27 January 1944	23:10	Lancaster	Sautour	Lancaster JB724/No. 83 Squadron RAF
63	49	26 March 1944	22:55	four-engined bomber	Dinant	
64	50	26 March 1944	23:00	four-engined bomber	north of Philippeville	
65	51	22 April 1944	23:50	four-engined bomber	Soissons	
66	52	23 April 1944	00:57	Lancaster	9 km (5.6 mi) south-southeast of Namur	
67	53	28 April 1944	02:50	Lancaster	northwest of Dunkirk	
68	54	28 May 1944	03:17	unknown	Ostend-Bruges	Lancaster ND925/No. 103 Squadron RAF
69	55	8 June 1944	03:05	Lancaster	northwest of Fécamp	
70	56	8 June 1944	03:14	Stirling	northwest of Fécamp	
71	57	13 June 1944	01:36	Lancaster	Saint-Sauflieu/Amiens	
72	58	13 June 1944	01:45	Lancaster	Saint-Just	
– Jagdverband 44 –
73		27 April 1945	—	P-47	near Munich-Riem	

=== Awards ===
- German Cross in Gold on 7 February 1942 as Oberleutnant in the III./Nachtjagdgeschwader 3
- Knight's Cross of the Iron Cross with Oak Leaves
  - Knight's Cross on 20 June 1943 as Hauptmann and Gruppenkommandeur of I./Nachtjagdgeschwader 4 (Note: According to Scherzer as Hauptmann of the Reserves.)
  - 451st Oak Leaves on 11 April 1944 as Major and Gruppenkommandeur of I./Nachtjagdgeschwader 4 (Note: According to Scherzer as Major of the Reserves.)
