= Anton Hafner =

German World War II flying ace

- Anton Hafner
- Born: 2 June 1918; Erbach an der Donau, Kingdom of Württemberg, German Empire
- Died: 17 October 1944 (aged 26) near Gumbinnen, Province of East Prussia, Free State of Prussia, Nazi Germany
- Cause of death: Killed in action
- Military career
- Allegiance: Nazi Germany
- Branch: Luftwaffe
- Service years: 1939–1944
- Rank: Oberleutnant (first lieutenant)
- Nickname: Toni
- Unit: JG 51
- Conflicts: See battles World War II: Eastern Front; Operation Barbarossa; North African campaign; Tunisian Campaign
- Awards: Knight's Cross of the Iron Cross with Oak Leaves

Anton Hafner (2 June 1918 − 17 October 1944) was a German Luftwaffe military aviator during World War II and a fighter ace credited with 204 enemy aircraft shot down in 795 combat missions. The majority of his victories were claimed on the Eastern Front, but he also claimed 20 victories over the Western Front during the North African Campaign.

Born in Erbach an der Donau, Hafner grew up in the Weimar Republic and Nazi Germany. Following the compulsory Reich Labour Service (Reichsarbeitsdienst), he was conscripted into military service with the Luftwaffe of the Wehrmacht. In February 1941 he was posted to Jagdgeschwader 51 (JG 51—51st Fighter Wing), flying his first combat missions against the Royal Air Force on the English Channel. Hafner claimed his first aerial victory on 24 June 1941 during Operation Barbarossa, the German invasion of the Soviet Union. Following his 60th aerial victory, he was awarded the Knight's Cross of the Iron Cross on 23 August 1942. His unit was then transferred to Tunisia in North Africa where he claimed 20 aerial victories. Back on the Eastern Front in August 1943, he was awarded the Knight's Cross of the Iron Cross with Oak Leaves on 11 April 1944 after achieving 134 aerial victories. On 15 May 1944, he was appointed squadron leader of 8. Staffel (8th squadron) of JG 51. Hafner claimed his 204th and last aerial victory on 17 October 1944. During this encounter, he flew into a tree, killing him.

== Early life and career ==
Hafner, the son of a Meister, a master craftsman, in the field of tinsmith, was born on 2 June 1918 in Erbach an der Donau in the Kingdom of Württemberg of the German Empire. Following the compulsory Reich Labour Service (Reichsarbeitsdienst), he was conscripted into military service with the Luftwaffe of the Wehrmacht in July 1939. Following flight and fighter pilot training, (Note: Flight training in the Luftwaffe progressed through the levels A1, A2 and B1, B2, referred to as A/B flight training. A training included theoretical and practical training in aerobatics, navigation, long-distance flights and dead-stick landings. The B courses included high-altitude flights, instrument flights, night landings and training to handle the aircraft in difficult situations.) he was transferred to 6. Staffel (6th squadron) of Jagdgeschwader 51 (JG 51—51st Fighter Wing) on 23 February 1941. (Note: For an explanation of Luftwaffe unit designations, see Organization of the Luftwaffe during World War II.)

== World War II ==
Hafner had been posted to 6. Staffel, a squadron of II. Gruppe (2nd group) of JG 51, one and a half years after the start of World War II. The unit had just undergone a period of replenishment and rest at Mannheim-Sandhofen and was being redeployed to an airfield at Mardyck, west of Dunkirk on the Channel Front. Hafner flew his first combat missions in this theater of operations. On 29 March 1941, he made a forced landing in his Messerschmitt Bf 109 E-4 (Werknummer 3766—factory number) and sustained minor injuries. On 1 June, II. Gruppe was withdrawn from the Channel Front and moved to Dortmund for conversion to the Bf 109 F-2 and preparation for Operation Barbarossa, the German invasion of the Soviet Union. Deployment east began on 10 June where II. Gruppe was initially based at Siedlce (General Government), familiarizing themselves with the Bf 109 F-2, and patrolling the border along the Bug River. The German attack began on the early morning on 22 June with II. Gruppe flying fighter escort missions in support of the German advance. The Gruppe was moved to an airfield at Terespol in the afternoon on 23 June. The next day, Hafner claimed his first aerial victory, a Tupolev SB bomber. On 3 July he claimed 5th aerial victory and was awarded the Iron Cross 2nd Class (Eisernes Kreuz zweiter Klasse) on 6 July and the Iron Cross 1st Class (Eisernes Kreuz erster Klasse) on 18 July.

Hafner was awarded the German Cross in Gold (Deutsches Kreuz in Gold) on 22 May 1942. He became an "ace-in-a-day" for the first time on 5 July 1942 when he shot down seven enemy aircraft, aerial victories 35–41. On 22 August, he claimed his 60th aerial victory and was nominated for the Knight's Cross of the Iron Cross (Ritterkreuz des Eisernen Kreuzes) which was awarded to him on 23 August.

=== North Africa ===
II. Gruppe had been withdrawn from the Eastern Front in early October 1942 and sent to Jesau near Königsberg in East Prussia, present day Yushny, Bagrationovsky District, for conversion to the Focke-Wulf Fw 190. Conversion training began on 7 October and on 4 November, the unit received the order to convert back to the Bf 109 and to transfer to the Mediterranean theatre. Via various stopovers, II. Gruppe moved to Sidi Ahmed airfield, arriving on 14 November. There, the unit was subordinated to Fliegerführer Tunis (Flying Leader Tunis). Two days later, on fighter escort mission for III. Gruppe (3rd group) of Zerstörergeschwader 2 (ZG 2—2nd Destroyer Fighter Wing), Hafner claimed his first victory in this theatre of operations. The unit then moved to an airfield at El Aouina. On 18 December 1942, Hafner claimed two aerial victories over Lockheed P-38 Lightning fighter aircraft, taking his total to 78 aerial victories. One of his opponents was Norman L. Widen of the United States Army Air Forces (USAAF) 94th Fighter Squadron. Widen bailed out and was taken prisoner of war and brought to Hafner's airfield. After Hafner landed, Widen presented Hafner his silver pilot insignia. Before Widen was taken to the prisoner-of-war camp, Hafner and Widen promised to meet again after the war. Hafner sent the gift to his brother, Alfons Hafner, with the request to return the gifts together with a medal and picture of Anton Hafner in case of Anton Hafner getting killed in action. In 1960 Alfons Hafner managed to contact Major Widen via the US Airforce to fulfil his brother's will. This story was published Life magazine on 14 April 1961. (Note: By chance a photographer with the German Propaganda English language magazine "Signal" happened to snap photographs of Widen's plane crashing and Widen being both captured and meeting Hafner)

On 2 January 1943, Hafner was shot down and bailed out of his Bf 109 G-2 trop (Werknummer 13 985) near Pont du Fahs. It is believed that his victor may have been Bobby Oxspring. Hafner bailed out wounded, ending his service in North Africa. His injuries included a complex fracture of his arm. Following his convalescence, he was promoted to Leutnant (second lieutenant) on 1 June 1943.

=== Eastern Front and death ===
Hafner returned to JG 51 "Mölders" in August 1943, then operating on the Eastern Front. There, he was assigned to the Stabsstaffel (headquarters squadron). (Note: In early October 1942, II. Gruppe of JG 51 had been withdrawn from the Eastern Front and sent to Jesau, near present-day Bagrationovsk, to Heiligenbeil, present-day Mamonovo, to be reequipped with the Focke-Wulf Fw 190 A. While undergoing training on this aircraft, the Gruppe received orders on 4 November to transfer to the Mediterranean theatre flying the Messerschmitt Bf 109 again. 6. Staffel had been exempt from this order, was detached from II. Gruppe, and continued its training on the Fw 190. In late November, 6. Staffel was renamed to Stabsstaffel (headquarters squadron) of JG 51. Alternatively, the Stabsstaffel was also referred to as Geschwaderstabsstaffel z.b.V., roughly translating to fighter wing squadron for special deployment'. The abbreviation z. b. V. is German and stands for zur besonderen Verwendung (for special deployment).) On 15 October 1943, the Soviet Central Front launched an offensive, attacking Army Group Centre on its southern flank at Loyew on the Dnieper. That day, Hafner was credited with his 100th aerial victory in that area of operations. He was the 56th Luftwaffe pilot to achieve the century mark. The Stabsstaffel had provided fighter escort to a flight of Heinkel He 111 bombers attacking ground targets in the vicinity of Gomel. On this mission, the Stabsstaffel ran into Soviet Douglas A-20 Havoc bombers, also known as Boston, which were protected by Lavochkin La-5 fighters. Hafner claimed two Bostons and a La-5 in this encounter. But his Fw 190 A-6 (Werknummer 530 373) also sustained battle damage, resulting in a forced landing on German held territory.

On 12 January 1944, Hafner made a forced landing in his Fw 190 A south of Parichi, 29 kilometers (18 miles) northwest of Svetlahorsk on the Berezina river. A barrel burst during combat with Petlyakov Pe-2 bombers on 29 March resulted in an emergency landing at Liuboml. Following his 134th aerial victory, Hafner was awarded the Knight's Cross of the Iron Cross with Oak Leaves (Ritterkreuz des Eisernen Kreuzes mit Eichenlaub) on 11 April 1944, the 452nd soldier to receive this distinction. The presentation was made by Adolf Hitler at the Berghof, Hitler's residence in the Obersalzberg of the Bavarian Alps, on 5 May 1944. Also present at the ceremony were Otto Kittel, Günther Schack, Alfred Grislawski, Emil Lang, Erich Rudorffer, Martin Möbus, Wilhelm Herget, Hans-Karl Stepp, Rudolf Schoenert, Günther Radusch, Otto Pollmann and Fritz Breithaupt, who all received the Oak Leaves on this date.

Hafner succeeded Hauptman Fritz Stendel as Staffelkapitän (squadron leader) of 8. Staffel (8th squadron) of JG 51 "Mölders" on 15 May. This squadron was redesignated as 10. Staffel (10th squadron) in August. On 24 June, the Soviet Air Forces fielded 4,500 combat missions over the combat area of Army Group Centre while Luftflotte 6 (Air Fleet 6) flew 111 ground attack and 150 fighter missions, creating a 1:15 discrepancy. That day, III. Gruppe flew several missions in the combat area south and southeast of Babruysk. During these missions, Hafner claimed aerial victories 140 to 144, thus becoming most successful fighter pilot of JG 51 "Mölders", a distinction he would hold until the end of World War II in Europe. On 28 June, Hafner's Bf 109 G-6 (Werknummer 411 203) was hit by ground fire, resulting in a forced landing 10 kilometers (6.2 miles) northwest of Asipovichy.

On 16 October 1944, Hafner destroyed four fighters thus taking him past the double century mark. Hafner's 204th and last victory was a Yakovlev Yak-7 fighter claimed on 17 October 1944. That day, JG 51 "Mölders" lost twelve aircraft in combat with the French Armée de l'Air Normandie-Niemen fighter regiment serving on the Eastern Front. In this encounter, Hafner's Bf 109 G-6 (Werknummer 442 013) "Black 1" hit a tree and crashed near Schweizersfelde, present-day Lomowo, located approximately 10 kilometers (6.2 miles) east-northeast of Gusev, killing him. He was the highest-scoring pilot of JG 51 "Mölders". Hafner was replaced by Oberleutnant Helmut Besekau as commander of 10. Staffel.

== Summary of career ==
=== Aerial victory claims ===
According to US historian David T. Zabecki, Hafner was credited with 204 aerial victories. Obermaier also lists him with 204 aerial victories claimed in 795 combat missions, including 175 close air support missions. He claimed 184 victories over the Eastern Front. Of his 20 victories claimed over the Western Front, eight were P-38 two engine fighters and two were four-engined bombers. Spick presents the same number of aerial victories, however claimed in 794 combat missions and a mission-to-claim ratio of 3.90. Mathews and Foreman, authors of Luftwaffe Aces — Biographies and Victory Claims, researched the German Federal Archives and found records for 203 aerial victory claims, plus one further unconfirmed claim. This figure includes 184 aerial victories on the Eastern Front and 19 on the Western Front, including one four-engined bombers.

Victory claims were logged to a map-reference (PQ = Planquadrat), for example "PQ 47654". The Luftwaffe grid map (Jägermeldenetz) covered all of Europe, western Russia and North Africa and was composed of rectangles measuring 15 minutes of latitude by 30 minutes of longitude, an area of about 360 square miles (930 km^{2}). These sectors were then subdivided into 36 smaller units to give a location area 3 km × 4 km (1.9 mi × 2.5 mi) in size.

Chronicle of aerial victories
This and the ♠ (Ace of spades) indicates those aerial victories which made Hafner an "ace-in-a-day", a term which designates a fighter pilot who has shot down five or more airplanes in a single day. This and the – (dash) indicates unconfirmed aerial victory claims for which Hafner did not receive credit. This and the ? (question mark) indicates information discrepancies listed by Prien, Stemmer, Rodeike, Bock, Mathews and Foreman.
Claim	Date	Time	Type	Location	Claim	Date	Time	Type	Location
– 6. Staffel of Jagdgeschwader 51 –
1	24 June 1941	—	SB-2		32	5 April 1942	12:30	MiG-3	
2	25 June 1941	—	SB-2		33	6 April 1942	08:00	Pe-2	
3	3 July 1941	15:12	Potez 63	15 km (9.3 mi) southeast of Stara Bychow	34	27 April 1942	17:35	Il-2	
4	3 July 1941	—	Potez 63		35♠	5 July 1942	06:05	MiG-1	
5	3 July 1941	—	Potez 63		36♠	5 July 1942	06:15	Il-2	
6	23 July 1941	—	DB-3		37♠	5 July 1942	09:32	Il-2	
7	31 August 1941	15:55	DB-3	30 km (19 mi) southwest of Potschep	38♠	5 July 1942	09:45	Il-2	
8	12 September 1941	—	R-3		39♠	5 July 1942	11:20	Yak-1	20 km (12 mi) northeast of Bolkhov
9	12 September 1941	—	R-3		40♠	5 July 1942	11:45	Yak-1	13 km (8.1 mi) north of Bolkhov
10	20 September 1941	12:11	R-Z		41♠	5 July 1942	15:46	Yak-1	
11	27 September 1941	—	I-18 (MiG-1)		42	6 July 1942	19:12	Yak-1	
12	4 October 1941	14:42	I-16		43	8 July 1942	04:30	Yak-1	
13	15 November 1941	13:10	DB-3		44	8 July 1942	16:15	Yak-1	
14	18 November 1941	15:15	I-16		45	10 July 1942	12:13	MiG-1	
—	19 January 1942	—	I-16		46	10 July 1942	19:25	Yak-1	
15	17 February 1942	09:55	R-Z		47	11 July 1942	05:05	MiG-1	
16	23 February 1942	11:00	R-10		48	11 July 1942	05:08	MiG-1	
17	23 February 1942	11:05	I-18 (MiG-1)		49	23 July 1942	10:20	Pe-2	15 km (9.3 mi) northwest of Bolkhov
18	1 March 1942	16:10	I-16		50	23 July 1942	10:45	MiG-3	15 km (9.3 mi) northwest of Zhizdra
19	4 March 1942	15:58	I-16		51	5 August 1942	06:12	Yak-1	PQ 47654; 20 km (12 mi) southwest of Staritsa
20	6 March 1942	10:35	I-18 (MiG-1)		52	5 August 1942	09:16	MiG-1	PQ 47664; 15 km (9.3 mi) south of Staritsa
21	6 March 1942	13:40	I-16		53	6 August 1942	11:03	MiG-1	PQ 47824; 10 km (6.2 mi) east of Zubtsov
22	7 March 1942	09:56	R-3		54	7 August 1942	14:50	MiG-1	PQ 56141; 40 km (25 mi) north of Gagarin
23	16 March 1942	14:25	I-18 (MiG-1)		55	12 August 1942	09:26? (Note: According to Mathews and Foreman claimed at 09:25.)	MiG-1	PQ 54272; 25 km (16 mi) southeast of Kozelsk
24	20 March 1942	13:40	I-16		56	21 August 1942	14:42	I-16	PQ 64854; 20 km (12 mi) southeast of Mtsensk
25	21 March 1942	08:20	Pe-2		57	22 August 1942	05:03	Yak-1	PQ 54253; 15 km (9.3 mi) south of Kozelsk
26	22 March 1942	17:30	I-61		58	22 August 1942	08:35	MiG-3	PQ 54461; 15 km (9.3 mi) northwest of Bolkhov
27	22 March 1942	17:33	I-61		59	22 August 1942	13:12	Yak-1	PQ 54274; 25 km (16 mi) southwest of Kozelsk
28	29 March 1942	14:55	R-Z		60	22 August 1942	17:58	Il-2	PQ 54282; 25 km (16 mi) south of Kozelsk
29	30 March 1942	07:42	MiG-1		61	23 August 1942	17:20	Il-2	PQ 54281; 25 km (16 mi) south of Kozelsk
30	30 March 1942	17:03	MiG-3		62	24 August 1942	18:42	I-180 (Yak-7)	PQ 54244; 20 km (12 mi) southwest of Kozelsk
31	5 April 1942	10:55	MiG-3						
– 4. Staffel of Jagdgeschwader 51 –
63	16 November 1942	12:12	Spitfire	20 km (12 mi) east of Bône	73	5 December 1942	12:03	P-38	10 km (6.2 mi) south of Tebourba
64	17 November 1942	13:38	Beaufort	15 km (9.3 mi) west of Bizerta	74	5 December 1942	12:18	Spitfire	5 km (3.1 mi) north of Tebourba
65	27 November 1942	09:17	Spitfire	8 km (5.0 mi) east of Béja	75	7 December 1942	12:08	Spitfire	3 km (1.9 mi) northwest of Tabourba
66	27 November 1942	16:48	Spitfire	20 km (12 mi) southwest of Mateur	76	17 December 1942	15:55	P-38	2 km (1.2 mi) southeast of Medjez el Bab
67	28 November 1942	16:48	Stirling	35 km (22 mi) west of Bizerta	77	18 December 1942	11:30	P-38	8 km (5.0 mi) northwest of Tunis
68	30 November 1942	14:47	P-38	15 km (9.3 mi) southwest of Tunis	78	18 December 1942	11:34	P-38	Tunis-El Aouina Airport
69	1 December 1942	10:41	Spitfire	13 km (8.1 mi) southwest of Mateur	79	28 December 1942	15:31	P-38	PQ 03 Ost 97634
70	1 December 1942	10:46	Spitfire	20 km (12 mi) southwest of Mateur	80? (Note: This claim is not listed by Mathews and Foreman.)	1 January 1943	11:42	Boston	5 km (3.1 mi) southeast of Tunis
71	2 December 1942	08:32	Spitfire	5 km (3.1 mi) south of Tebourba	81	2 January 1943	12:28	P-38	10 km (6.2 mi) southeast of Pont du Fahs
72	3 December 1942	12:35	P-38	15 km (9.3 mi) southwest of Tunis	82	2 January 1943	16:45	Spitfire	5 km (3.1 mi) southeast of Mateur; 5 km (3.1 mi) southwest of Tunis
– Stabsstaffel of Jagdgeschwader 51 –
83	29 August 1943	13:05	Il-2 m.H. (Note: The "m.H." refers to an Ilyushin Il-2 with rear gunner (mit Heckschütze).)	PQ 35 Ost 42134; 25 km (16 mi) south of Sevsk	110♠	28 October 1943	14:55	Boston	southeast of Rechytsa
84	29 August 1943	13:07	Il-2 m.H.	PQ 35 Ost 42165; 30 km (19 mi) south of Sevsk	111♠	28 October 1943	14:59	LaGG-3	west of Loyew
85	1 September 1943	18:13	Il-2 m.H.	PQ 35 Ost 35347; 15 km (9.3 mi) northwest of Yelnya	112	5 November 1943	15:08	Yak-7	southeast of Nevel
86	1 September 1943	18:14	Il-2 m.H.	PQ 35 Ost 35349; 15 km (9.3 mi) northwest of Yelnya	113	10 November 1943	09:25	Yak-9	southwest of Nevel
87	2 September 1943	11:11	Il-2 m.H.	PQ 35 Ost 25498, west-southwest of Yelnya; 20 km (12 mi) west of Yelnya	114	10 November 1943	09:29	Yak-9	southwest of Nevel
88	2 September 1943	11:13	Il-2 m.H.	PQ 35 Ost 35377; 10 km (6.2 mi) west of Yelnya	115	11 November 1943	10:50	Il-2 m.H.	east of Vitebsk
89	5 September 1943	11:23	Il-2 m.H.	southwest of Yelnya; 10 km (6.2 mi) west of Yelnya	116	17 November 1943	09:46	Pe-2	south of Nevel
90	5 September 1943	11:25	Il-2 m.H.	south-southwest of Yelnya; 15 km (9.3 mi) south-southwest of Yelnya	117	22 November 1943	09:05	Il-2 m.H.	west of Vetka
91	11 September 1943	10:45	MiG-3	north of Bryansk	118	29 November 1943	14:23	Pe-2	25 km (16 mi) east of Zhlobin
92	11 September 1943	10:46	MiG-3	north-north of Bryansk	119	10 January 1944	12:27	Il-2	PQ 25 Ost 93614; 40 km (25 mi) south-southeast of Parichi
93	3 October 1943	13:25	Pe-2	east-southeast of Yelsk	120	10 January 1944	12:30	Il-2	PQ 25 Ost 93536, east of Azarychy; 30 km (19 mi) south of Parichi
94	3 October 1943	16:00	La-5	east-southeast of Yelsk	121	12 January 1944	13:20	Il-2	PQ 25 Ost 93614; 30 km (19 mi) south of Parichi
95	3 October 1943	16:03	La-5	east-southeast of Yelsk	122	12 January 1944	13:22	La-5	PQ 25 Ost 93533; 30 km (19 mi) south of Parichi
96	4 October 1943	14:16	MiG-3	northeast of Chernobyl	123	16 January 1944	13:02	Pe-2	PQ 25 Ost 93475; 30 km (19 mi) south-southeast of Parichi
97	6 October 1943	13:35	Yak-1	east-southeast of Owrutsch	124	7 February 1944	08:07	La-5	PQ 35 Ost 06788; 15 km (9.3 mi) southeast of Kamary
98	15 October 1943	09:45	La-5	west-northwest of Radul	125	7 February 1944	12:58	La-5	PQ 35 Ost 06795; 20 km (12 mi) east-southeast of Kamary
99	15 October 1943	09:47	Boston	northwest of Hubetsch	126♠	22 February 1944	11:21	Pe-2	PQ 35 Ost 03151; 10 km (6.2 mi) east of Zhlobin
100	15 October 1943	09:51	Boston	west of Hubetsch	127♠	22 February 1944	13:02	Yak-7	PQ 25 Ost 94857; 20 km (12 mi) west of Rogatschew
101	19 October 1943	12:05	La-5	northeast of Radul	128♠	22 February 1944	13:10	Il-2	PQ 35 Ost 04742; 5 km (3.1 mi) north of Rogatschew
102♠	20 October 1943	08:20	MiG-3	north of Radul	129♠	22 February 1944	15:02	Yak-7	PQ 25 Ost 93239; 10 km (6.2 mi) northwest of Zhlobin
103♠	20 October 1943	11:50	La-5	southeast of Loyew	130♠	22 February 1944	15:03	Yak-7	PQ 25 Ost 94897; 10 km (6.2 mi) west-southwest of Rogatschew
104♠	20 October 1943	11:57	LaGG-3	west of Loyew	131♠	22 February 1944	15:04	Il-2	PQ 25 Ost 94895; 10 km (6.2 mi) west-southwest of Rogatschew
105♠	20 October 1943	15:08	Il-2 m.H.	northwest of Loyew	132♠	22 February 1944	15:06	Il-2	PQ 35 Ost 04119; 20 km (12 mi) west-northwest of Mogilew
106♠	20 October 1943	15:12	La-5	west of Loyew	133	24 March 1944	09:00	Il-2	PQ 25 Ost 42879; 15 km (9.3 mi) northwest of Kovel
107♠	28 October 1943	12:50	Boston	north of Loyew	134	27 March 1944	15:10	U-2	PQ 25 Ost 42448; 45 km (28 mi) south-southwest of Kovel
108♠	28 October 1943	12:53	Yak-7	southeast of Rechytsa	135	28 March 1944	07:07	Il-2	PQ 25 Ost 42698; 15 km (9.3 mi) northeast of Kovel
109♠	28 October 1943	13:04	Yak-7	northwest of Loyew					
– 8. Staffel of Jagdgeschwader 51 –
136	30 May 1944	08:01	Yak-7	PQ 25 Ost 42515 vicinity of Korenewo	154♠	16 July 1944	12:25	Il-2 m.H.	PQ 25 Ost 50373; 15 km (9.3 mi) northeast of Berezhany
137	23 June 1944	16:40? (Note: According to Mathews and Foreman claimed at 16:45.)	Yak-9	PQ 35 Ost 05637; 15 km (9.3 mi) south of Talachyn	155♠	16 July 1944	18:30	La-5	PQ 25 Ost 50354; 25 km (16 mi) northwest of Ternopol
138	23 June 1944	16:55	Yak-9	PQ 35 Ost 05625; 15 km (9.3 mi) south of Talachyn	156	17 July 1944	19:30	Il-2 m.H.	PQ 25 Ost 50313; 15 km (9.3 mi) southeast of Zolochiv
139	23 June 1944	17:12	La-5	PQ 35 Ost 05429; 30 km (19 mi) north of Talachyn	157	17 July 1944	19:32	Il-2 m.H.	PQ 25 Ost 50312; 25 km (16 mi) east-southeast of Zolochiv
140♠	24 June 1944	08:25	Il-2 m.H.	PQ 25 Ost 93358; 20 km (12 mi) southwest of Parichi	158	28 July 1944	09:05	Yak-7	PQ 25 Ost 35689; 25 km (16 mi) northeast of Berzniki
141♠	24 June 1944	08:30	Il-2 m.H.	PQ 25 Ost 93355; 20 km (12 mi) southwest of Parichi	159	1 August 1944	07:05	La-5	PQ 25 Ost 35351; 10 km (6.2 mi) northwest of Mariampol
142♠	24 June 1944	11:21	Il-2 m.H.	PQ 25 Ost 93325; 20 km (12 mi) south-southwest of Babruysk	160	2 August 1944	10:40	Il-2	PQ 25 Ost 24436; 15 km (9.3 mi) south of Augustow
143♠	24 June 1944	15:57	Yak-9	PQ 25 Ost 94859, east of Babruysk; 20 km (12 mi) west of Rogatschew	161	5 August 1944	10:20	Yak-7	PQ 25 Ost 24833; 15 km (9.3 mi) northwest of Bialystok
144♠	24 June 1944	16:10	Yak-9	PQ 25 Ost 94863; 10 km (6.2 mi) west of Rogatschew	162♠	8 August 1944	14:27	Il-2 m.H.	PQ 25 Ost 36545; 20 km (12 mi) east-southeast of Nemakščiai
145	25 June 1944	09:43	Il-2 m.H.	PQ 25 Ost 93333; 10 km (6.2 mi) south of Parichi	163♠	8 August 1944	14:29	Il-2 m.H.	PQ 25 Ost 36548; 20 km (12 mi) east-southeast of Nemakščiai
146	25 June 1944	12:34	Yak-9	PQ 25 Ost 93141; 20 km (12 mi) west-northwest of Parichi	164♠	8 August 1944	14:30	Il-2 m.H.	PQ 25 Ost 36567; 30 km (19 mi) west-northwest of Kedainial
147	25 June 1944	19:01	Yak-9	PQ 25 Ost 94763; 15 km (9.3 mi) east of Babruysk	165♠	8 August 1944	16:32	Il-2	PQ 25 Ost 36548; 20 km (12 mi) east-southeast of Nemakščiai
148	26 June 1944	13:20	Yak-9	PQ 25 Ost 83229; 25 km (16 mi) east-southeast of Babruysk	166♠	8 August 1944	16:33	Il-2	PQ 25 Ost 36571; 20 km (12 mi) southeast of Nemakščiai
149	26 June 1944	15:55	Yak-9	PQ 25 Ost 94872; 30 km (19 mi) southwest of Babruysk	167♠	8 August 1944	16:35	Il-2	PQ 25 Ost 36575; 20 km (12 mi) southeast of Nemakščiai
150	26 June 1944	16:01	Yak-9	PQ 25 Ost 94876; 25 km (16 mi) east-southeast of Babruysk	168♠	8 August 1944	18:12	Il-2	PQ 25 Ost 36576; 20 km (12 mi) southeast of Nemakščiai
151♠	16 July 1944	08:42	Pe-2	PQ 25 Ost 50355; 25 km (16 mi) northwest of Ternopol	169	13 August 1944	15:10	Il-2 m.H.	PQ 25 Ost 24613; 45 km (28 mi) northeast of Lomza
152♠	16 July 1944	08:48	Il-2 m.H.	PQ 25 Ost 50178; 15 km (9.3 mi) east of Zolochiv	170	13 August 1944	17:57	Yak-7	PQ 25 Ost 24442; 25 km (16 mi) southeast of Lyck
153♠	16 July 1944	12:21	Il-2 m.H.	PQ 25 Ost 40463; 20 km (12 mi) north Berezany					
– 10. Staffel of Jagdgeschwader 51 –
171	17 August 1944	07:00	Yak-7	PQ 25 Ost 36347; 20 km (12 mi) northeast of Nemakščiai	188	24 September 1944	08:30	Yak-7	PQ 25 Ost 37362
172	17 August 1944	13:12	Yak-7	PQ 25 Ost 26285; 30 km (19 mi) southeast of Telsche	189	28 September 1944	10:32	Pe-2	PQ 25 Ost 17331; 30 km (19 mi) northeast of Libau
173	17 August 1944	13:14	Yak-7	PQ 25 Ost 27879; 20 km (12 mi) east-northeast of Telsche	190	5 October 1944	11:22	Il-2 m.H.	PQ 25 Ost 27862; 45 km (28 mi) east-northeast of Telsche
174	21 August 1944	16:51	Yak-7	PQ 25 Ost 37541; 55 km (34 mi) south-southwest of Schaulen	191	5 October 1944	13:59	Il-2 m.H.	PQ 25 Ost 36145; 20 km (12 mi) southwest of Schaulen
175	21 August 1944	16:52	Il-2 m.H.	PQ 25 Ost 37582; 40 km (25 mi) south-southwest of Schaulen	192	5 October 1944	14:11	Il-2 m.H.	PQ 25 Ost 36132 vicinity of Schaulen
176	23 August 1944	12:11	Il-2 m.H.	PQ 25 Ost 37579; 45 km (28 mi) south-southwest of Schaulen	193	6 October 1944	13:25	P-39	PQ 25 Ost 27876; 20 km (12 mi) northeast of Schaulen
177	23 August 1944	12:34	Il-2 m.H.	PQ 25 Ost 37863; 45 km (28 mi) east-northeast of Telsche	194	6 October 1944	15:45	Il-2 m.H.	PQ 25 Ost 26277; 25 km (16 mi) southeast of Telsche
178	24 August 1944	09:12	Yak-7	PQ 25 Ost 37754; 20 km (12 mi) south-southwest of Schaulen	195	13 October 1944	08:53	Pe-2	PQ 25 Ost 25125 vicinity of Neusiedel
179	24 August 1944	13:05	Il-2 m.H.	PQ 25 Ost 27499; 50 km (31 mi) south-southwest of Tukkum	196	13 October 1944	13:29	Boston	PQ 25 Ost 25356 vicinity of Goldingen
180	24 August 1944	15:05	La-5	PQ 25 Ost 37374; 40 km (25 mi) west-southwest of Mitau	197	14 October 1944	11:11	Yak-9	PQ 25 Ost 27337; 40 km (25 mi) east of Goldingen
181	25 August 1944	16:32	La-5	PQ 25 Ost 37378; 40 km (25 mi) west-southwest of Mitau	198	14 October 1944	11:13	Yak-9	PQ 25 Ost 27455; 45 km (28 mi) south-southwest of Tukkum
182	16 September 1944	16:52	Yak-9	PQ 25 Ost 17367; 25 km (16 mi) northeast of Libau	199	16 October 1944	09:55	Boston	PQ 25 Ost 35316; 20 km (12 mi) northwest of Mariampol
183	16 September 1944	16:57	Yak-9	PQ 25 Ost 17636; 55 km (34 mi) east-southeast of Libau	200	16 October 1944	09:57	Il-2 m.H.	PQ 25 Ost 35314; 20 km (12 mi) northwest of Mariampol
184	16 September 1944	17:01	Yak-9	PQ 25 Ost 17496; 45 km (28 mi) east-southeast of Libau	201	16 October 1944	12:00	Il-2 m.H.	PQ 25 Ost 25583 vicinity of Gołdap
185	17 September 1944	15:35	Il-2	PQ 25 Ost 27497; 50 km (31 mi) south-southwest of Tukkum	202	16 October 1944	13:55	Il-2 m.H.	PQ 25 Ost 25496; 25 km (16 mi) east of Trakehnen
186	19 September 1944	15:36	Pe-2	PQ 25 Ost 27654; 45 km (28 mi) northeast of Telsche	203	17 October 1944	07:47? (Note: According to Mathews and Foreman claimed at 04:47.)	Pe-2	PQ 25 Ost 25455; 25 km (16 mi) southeast of Blumenfeld
187	22 September 1944	10:29	Boston	PQ 25 Ost 27422; 40 km (25 mi) southwest of Tukkum	204	17 October 1944	09:55	Yak-7	PQ 25 Ost 25455; 25 km (16 mi) southeast of Blumenfeld

=== Awards ===
- Iron Cross (1939)
  - 2nd Class (6 July 1941)
  - 1st Class (18 July 1941)
- Honor Goblet of the Luftwaffe (27 April 1942)
- German Cross in Gold on 22 May 1942 as Unteroffizier in the 6./Jagdgeschwader 51
- Knight's Cross of the Iron Cross with Oak Leaves
  - Knight's Cross on 23 August 1942 as Feldwebel and pilot in the 6./Jagdgeschwader 51 "Mölders"
  - 452nd Oak Leaves on 11 April 1944 as Leutnant (war officer) and pilot in the 6./Jagdgeschwader 51 "Mölders"
