= Auton (surname) =

Auton is a surname. Notable people with the surname include:

- James Auton (1879–1924), British rugby union and rugby league footballer
- Jesse D. Auton (1904–1952), United States Air Force brigadier general
- Margaret Auton (born 1951), British swimmer
- Rob Auton, English stand-up comedian, writer, actor, poet, and podcaster
