= Erbach, Baden-Württemberg =

Place in Baden-Württemberg, Germany

Erbach
- Town
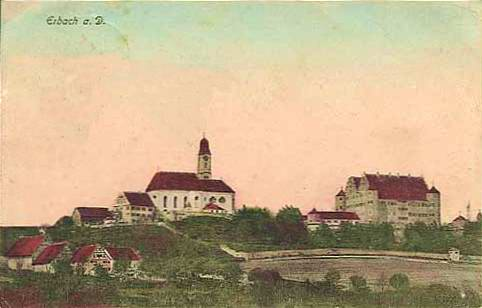
- Erbach about 1920

- Coat of arms

- Location of Erbach within Alb-Donau-Kreis district
- Interactive map of Erbach
- Location within Germany Location within Baden-Württemberg
- Coordinates: 48°19′39″N 9°53′33″E
- Country: Germany
- State: Baden-Württemberg
- Admin. region: Tübingen
- District: Alb-Donau-Kreis

Government
  - Mayor (2018–26): Achim Gaus

Area
  - Total: 63.29 km^{2} (24.44 sq mi)
- Elevation: 529 m (1,736 ft)

Population (2025-12-31)
  - Total: 14,126
  - Density: 223.2/km^{2} (578.1/sq mi)
- Time zone: UTC+01:00 (CET)
  - Summer (DST): UTC+02:00 (CEST)
- Postal codes: 89155
- Dialling codes: 07305
- Vehicle registration: UL
- Website: www.erbach-donau.de

Erbach (German pronunciation: [ˈɛʁbax]; Swabian: Ärrbach) is a town on the Danube River in Baden-Württemberg, Germany. Located in the Alb-Donau District, Erbach lies between Ulm and Ehingen an der Donau on the southern edge of the Swabian Jura.

== History ==
The oldest known mention of Erbach was in the Konstanz Tithe Book in 1275 as a parish called Irlebach, although findings dating from the Neolithic Age indicate the area around Erbach was settled earlier. Erbach received town privileges on August 1, 2002.

In 1972 the community Ringingen was incorporated into Erbach. In the course of community reforms in 1974 the communities Bach, Dellmensingen, Donaurieden and Ersingen were also incorporated into Erbach.

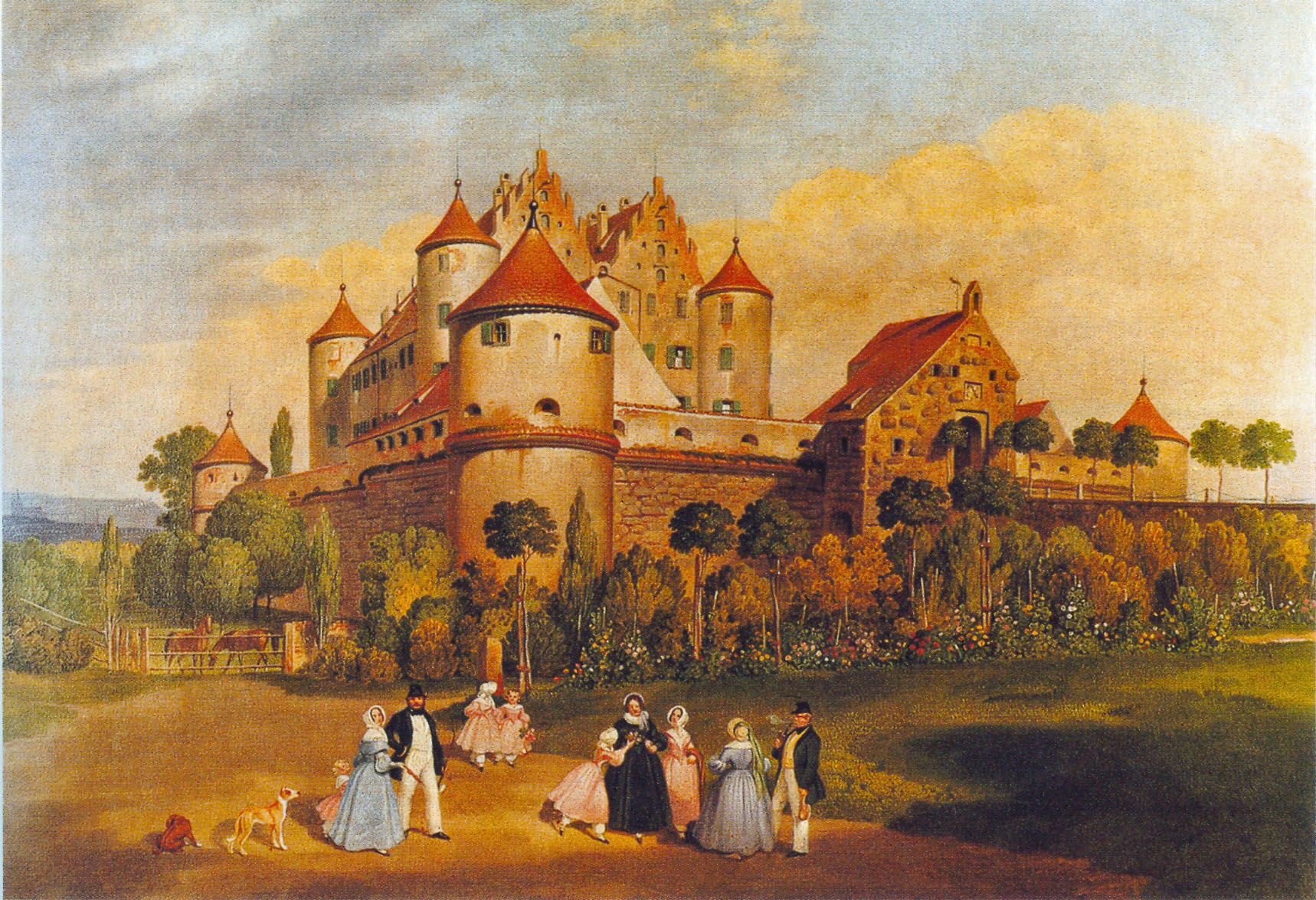
Erbach Castle 1844

== Politics ==
The mayor is elected for a term of eight years. The term of office of Paul Roth ended on November 26, 2010. His successor, Achim Gaus, was elected on October 24, 2010, in the second round and took up his duties on January 1, 2011.

=== Gemeinderat ===
The elections on May 25, 2014, led to the following results.

| Parteien und Wählergemeinschaften | | % 2014 | Sitze; 2014 |
| CDU | Christlich Demokratische Union Deutschlands | 42,0 | 9 |
| FW | Free Voters | 36,7 | 8 |
| SPD | Sozialdemokratische Partei Deutschlands | 12,5 | 3 |
| GRÜNE | Grüne | 8,8 | 2 |
| together | | 100,0 | 22 |
| participation | | 53,7 % | |

=== Town twinning ===
Erbach is twinned with Wolkersdorf im Weinviertel in Austria since 1981 and Thorigny sur Marne in France since 1982.

== Infrastructure ==
Erbach lies on the Bundesstraße 311 between Ulm and Ehingen. It is also located on the Southern Railway (Württemberg) between Ulm and Lindau. Erbach is part of the Danube-Iller Traffic Network, in whose tariff region the South Rail between Ulm and Bad Schussenried belongs to. Erbach has an airfield used by many private pilots from Ulm.

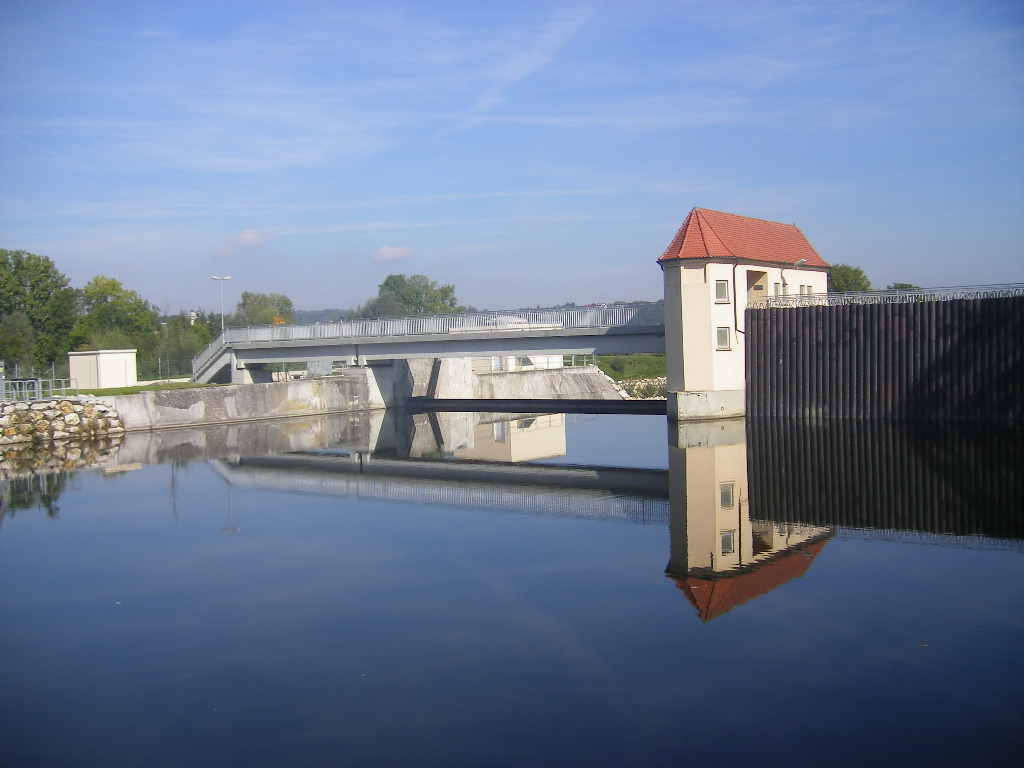
Power plant on the Danube between Erbach and Oberdischingen

== Sights ==
Erbach is located on the Upper Swabian Baroque Route as well as the Way of St. James. The most prominent sight is the Renaissance Erbach Castle, dating from the early 16th century. The castle was the residence of the Freiherren of Ulm in Erbach. Next to the castle is the Baroque Church of St. Martin from 1767.

Dellmensingen Castle is an early Baroque castle in Dellmensingen.

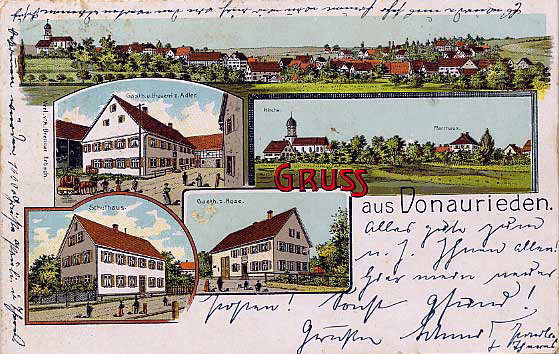
Donaurieden about 1900

== Personalities ==
- Joseph von Egle (1818–1899), architect, builder of the polytechnic school and the Church of St. Mary in Stuttgart

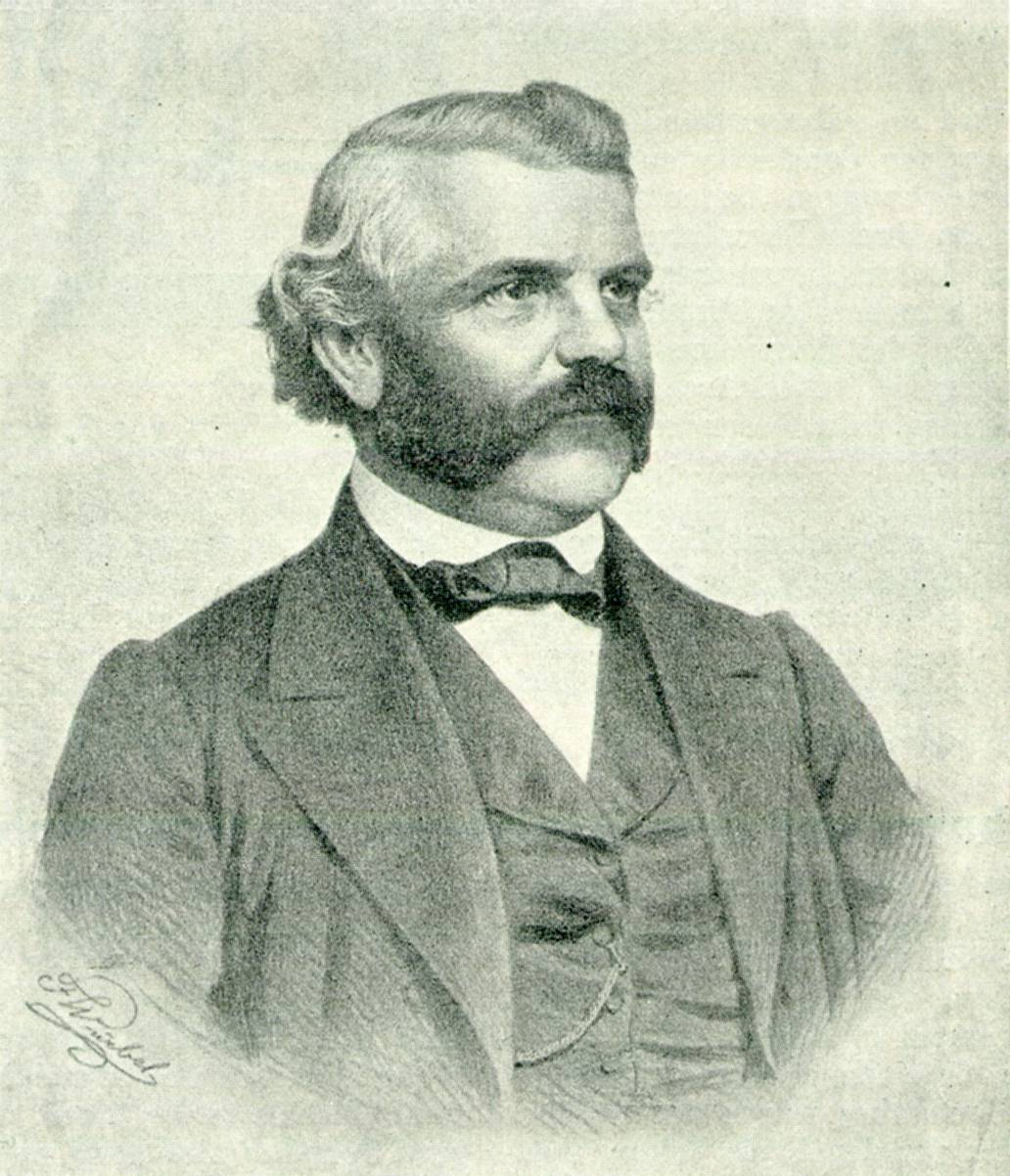
Joseph von Egle 1899

- Joseph Eberle, missionary in Africa
- Phillip Roth, honorable town speaker
- Franz Ignaz Albert of Werdenstein (1697–1766), Vicar and Auxiliary Bishop of Freising
- Maximilian Marquard of Ulm-Erbach-Mittelbiberach (1802–1864), landowner and a deputy in the Second Chamber of Württemberg Parliament
- Anton Hafner (1918–1944), officer of the Luftwaffe in World War II
- Wolf-Dietrich Hammann (born 1955), lawyer, assistant secretary in Stuttgart and former chief of police in Baden-Württemberg
- Manfred Albert von Richthofen (1953-2002), German-Brazilian engineer
