= Dellmensingen Castle =

- Schloss Dellmensingen
- Germany
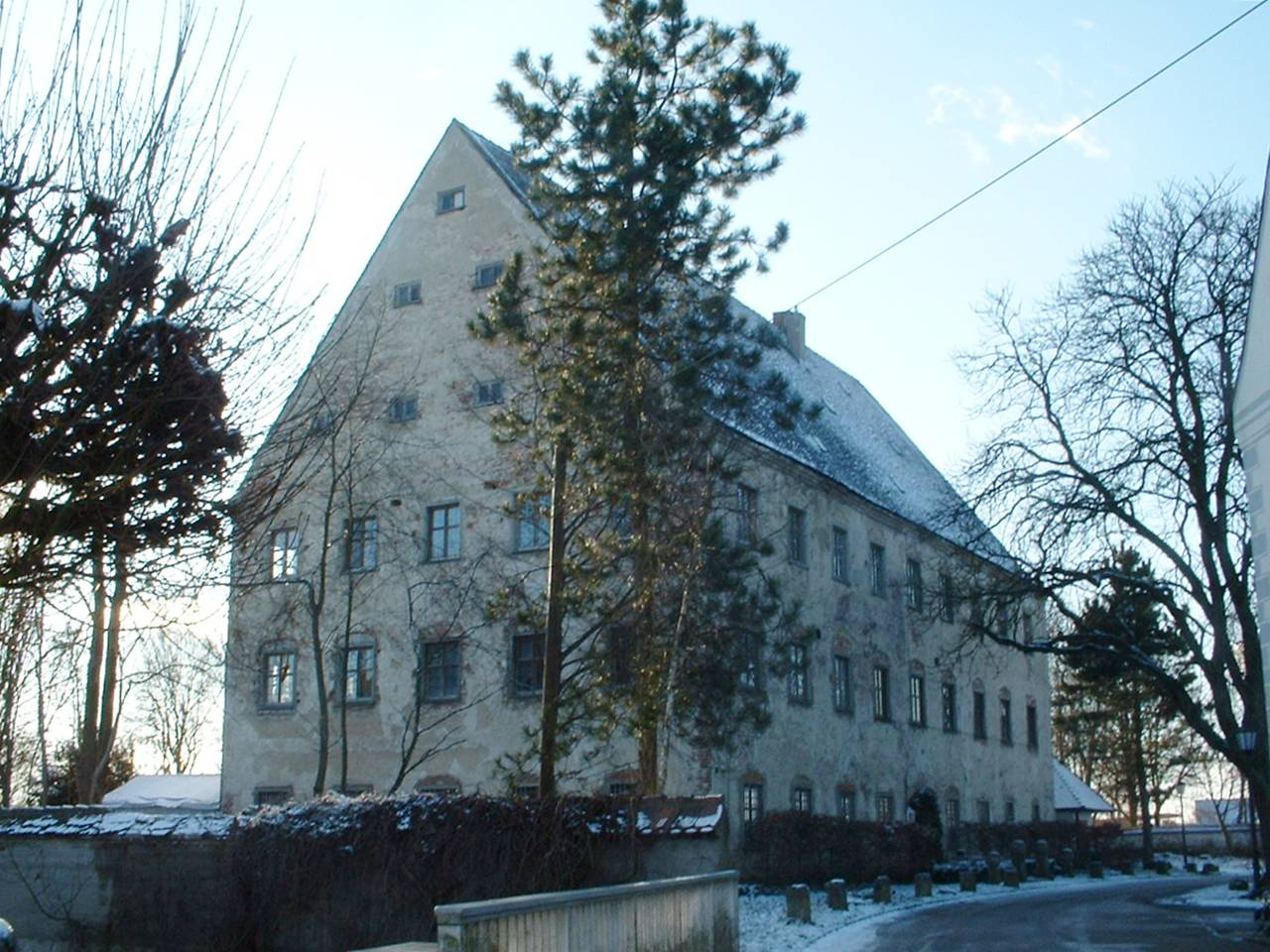

Location
- Coordinates: 48°18′02″N 9°53′50″E

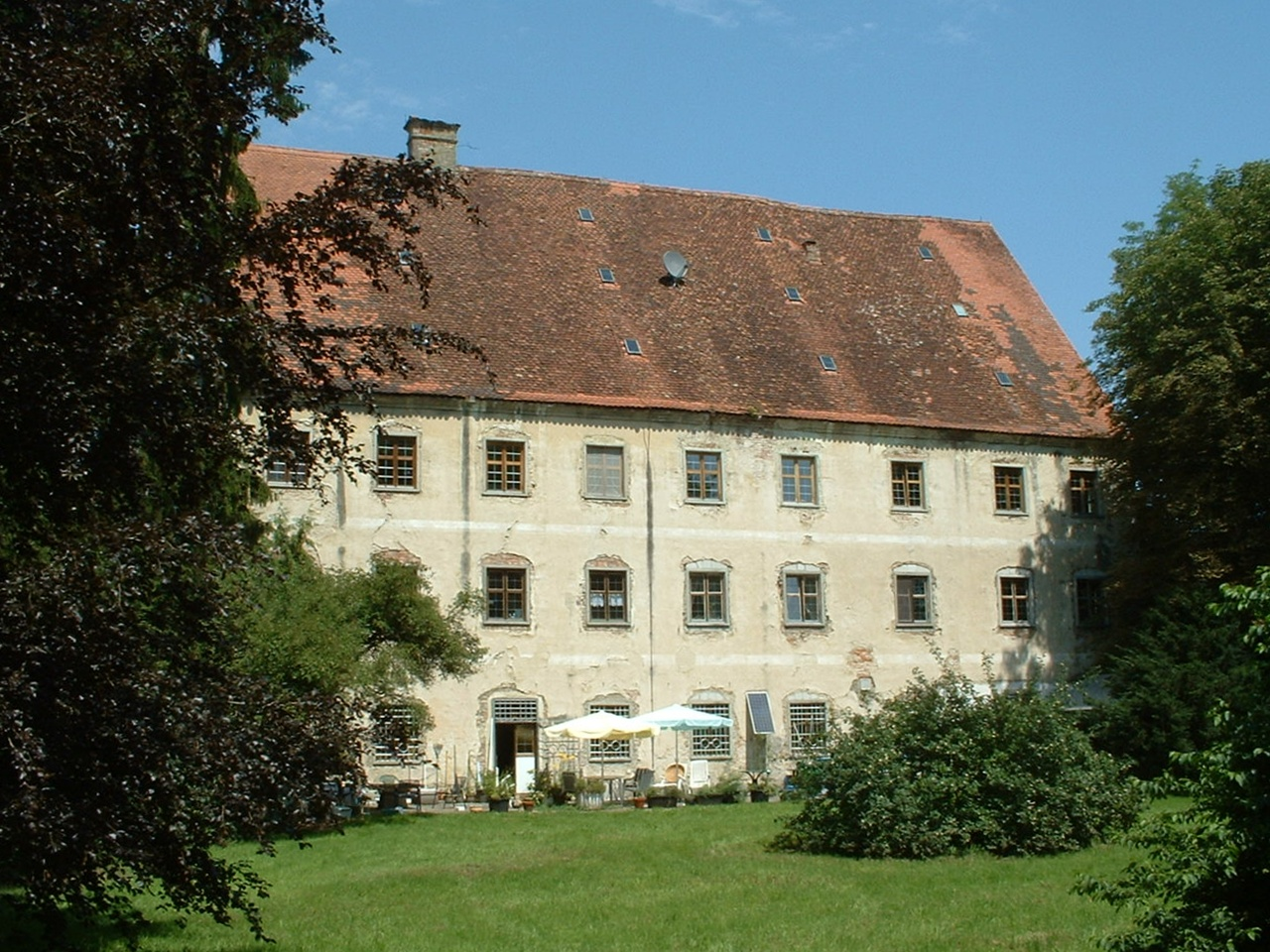
Dellmensingen Castle (back)

Dellmensingen Castle is an early Baroque castle in the Upper Swabian village of Dellmensingen, now part of the city of Erbach, in the state of Baden-Württemberg, Germany.

== Appearance ==
Dellmensingen Castle is a plain and unadorned three-storey stone building, covered by a gabled roof.

== History ==
For a long period of time there were two castles in Dellmensingen: the Untere Burg (Lower Castle), surrounded by a moat, mentioned in the 15th century, of which no remains are visible today as it was completely demolished in 1809, and the Obere Burg (Upper Castle). Both castles were destroyed during the Thirty Years War.

When the owner of the village of Dellmensingen, Johann Karl von Stotzingen, canon at Augsburg and Regensburg, died without there being a male successor in 1647, Ellwangen Abbey, which had seignory over the Lower Castle, attempted to expand its rights over the whole village, including the Upper Castle. This claim, however, was rejected by Emperor Ferdinand III whereupon the ownership of the Upper Castle together with its rights over the village went to Georg Heinrich von Werdenstein, an official in the service of Kempten Abbey, in 1657. Consequently, Dellmensingen became the main seat of residence for the Barons of Werdenstein. The dilapidated Lower Castle was rebuilt in Baroque style in 1685. It consisted not only of the actual castle building but also of stables, barns, bakery, a cowshed and other agricultural buildings, surrounded by castle walls. Castle Dellmensingen and its accompanying rights over the village remained in possession of the Barons of Werdenstein until 1796 when the last member of the family, Anton Christoph von Werdenstein, died without a male issue. The fiefdom of Dellmensingen returned to the Emperor.

During the German Mediatisation nuns of Söflingen Abbey, which was dissolved following its annexation by Bavaria, found temporary refuge in the castle in 1809.

After Dellmensingen had become part of the newly founded Kingdom of Württemberg, the castle was sold into private hands, first, in 1814, to two patricians from Biberach, then to a citizen from the village of Asch in 1840 and finally to Count Karl Viktor Reuttner von Weyl from Achstetten in 1851.

Between March and August 1942 Castle Dellmensingen was used as a so-called retirement home for Jews, where more than 100 elderly Jews were forced to live until their deportation to the death camps. 18 of the inhabitants died during their stay at the castle and were buried in the Jewish cemetery in Laupheim. In the autumn of 1942, the castle housed 23 families from Slovenia who were thought by the SS to be able to be Germanised. All of them returned to Slovenia in July 1945.

After the end of the Second World War the castle served as accommodation for ethnic Germans expelled from Eastern Europe and from 1947 until 1967 the charity organisation Caritas utilised the premises as an old people's home.

The then independent municipality of Dellmensingen bought the castle in 1955 from the Counts of Achstetten. In 1971, Castle Dellmensingen changed into private hands, followed by extensive interior renovation works.

== Current use ==
The interior of the castle has been separated into a number of flats and a business centre which offers office space for small companies.

== See also ==
- List of castles in Baden-Württemberg
