= Paltsevo =

Paltsevo may refer to:

- Paltsevo, Kursk Oblast, a village (selo) in Kursk Oblast, Russia
- Paltsevo, Leningrad Oblast, a rural locality in Leningrad Oblast, Russia
