= Nemakščiai =

Town in Samogitia Region, Lithuania

- Town
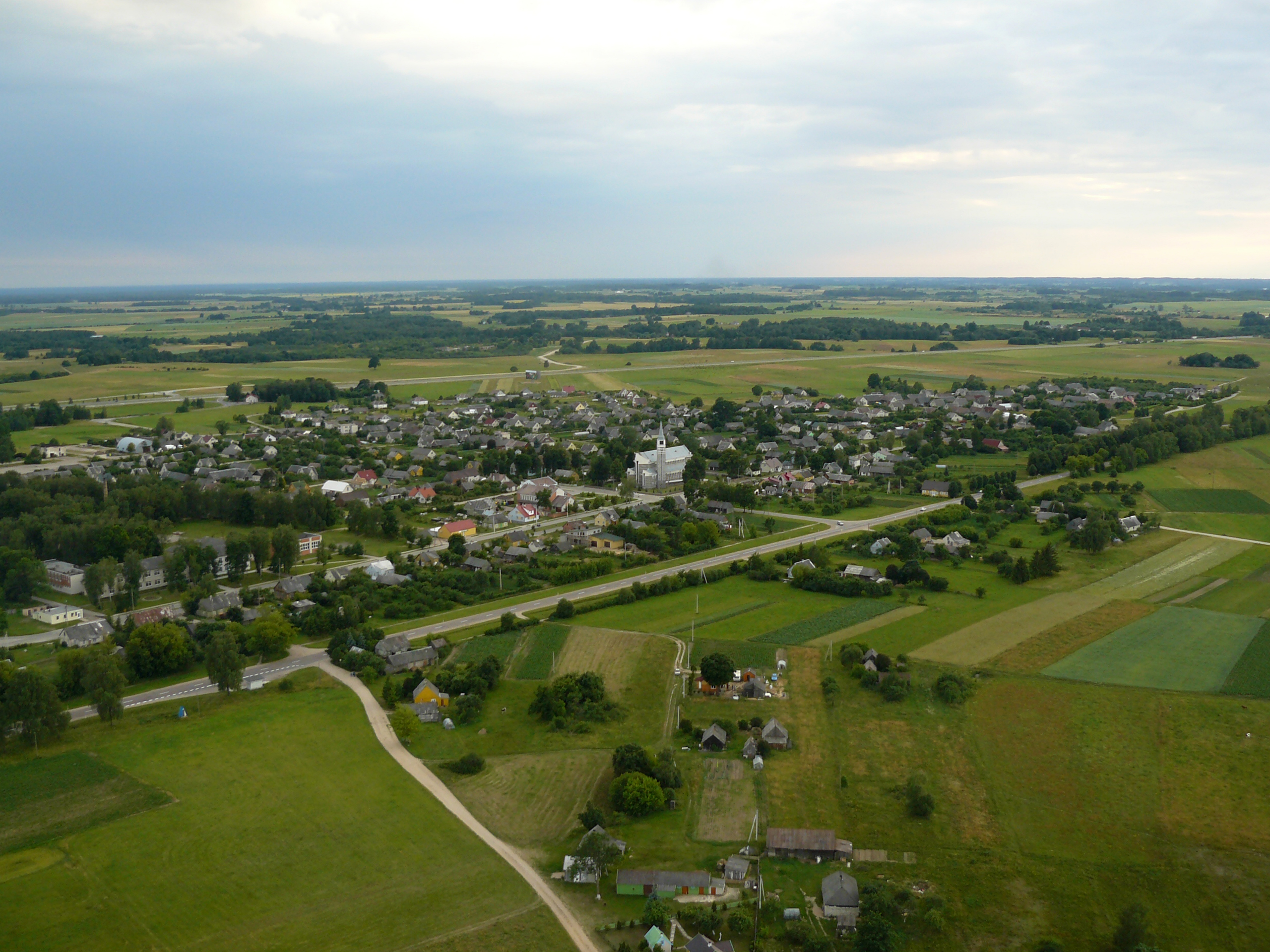

- Coat of arms

- Location in Lithuania
- Coordinates: 55°25′50″N 22°46′10″E
- Country: Lithuania
- Ethnographic region: Samogitia
- County: Kaunas County

Population (2011)
  - Total: 748
- Time zone: UTC+2 (EET)
  - Summer (DST): UTC+3 (EEST)

Nemakščiai is a small town in Kaunas County in central Lithuania. In 2011 it had a population of 748.

== History ==
The Jewish population was important in the town. In 1941, the Jews were massacred by an Einsatzgruppen. Different mass executions occurred. One of them was on August 22, 340 women and children were murdered while the Jewish men were taken to the railway station of Viduklė for slave work, where they were later killed.
