= Frankfurter Verein für Luftfahrt =

Non-profit organization

Frankfurter Verein für Luftfahrt e. V.
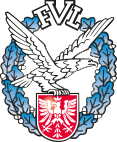
- Abbreviation: FVL
- Legal status: non-profit organization
- Headquarters: Egelsbach
- Members: 500
- 1. Vorsitzender: Alex Schneider
- Geschäftsführer: Matthias Schulte
- Website: www.fvl-online.de/de/
- Formerly called: Frankfurter Verein für Luftschiffahrt

The Frankfurter Verein für Luftfahrt e. V. (FVL) is a non-profit organization that is oriented towards aviation education and training. It has around 500 members and is one of the oldest air sports clubs in Germany.

== Field of activity ==
The association operates at two locations: The General Aviation group at Frankfurt Egelsbach Airport, the model airplane group in Diedenbergen.

A glider training school at the airport Gelnhausen was closed in the 1970s. The FVL fleet includes several aircraft, from simple training aircraft such as the Cessna 150 or Diamond DA20, to full instrument rated aircraft such as Piper PA-28. Furthermore, the club has a very extensive model aircraft fleet. The club offers courses to obtain a private pilot license, as well as certifications for radiotelephony, night flight and alpine instructions, as well as pinch hitter courses. In addition, it organizes fly-in's in many places in Germany.

FVL is recognized as a non-profit organization. It promotes aerospace in the region and supports its members in general aviation. Since 1958, he has initiated the "Rund um Egelsbach" flight of friends. Since then, many pilots from flying schools and clubs have been demonstrating their flying skills every year. FVL is a member of the Aircraft Owners and Pilots Association.

The association is financed by membership fees and private donations.

== History ==
=== Foundation ===
At the suggestion of Franz Linke, the future director of the Meteorological and Geophysical Institute of the Goethe University Frankfurt in Frankfurt am Main, the Frankfurter Verein für Luftschiffahrt was founded November 1908 in the association was registered at the Register of the Royal District Court

=== ILA 1909 ===
At the end of 1908, Lord Mayor Adickes took up the plan to organize the first International Airship Exhibition in Frankfurt, soon to be commonly known as the ILA. Effectively supported by the members of the newly founded association's board of directors, who are enthusiastic and influential about aviation.

The opening ceremony of the ILA took place on 10 July 1909 with the participation of the citizens of Frankfurt, important aviation and science men and many foreign guests.

With a happy idea, the board of the' Frankfurter Verein für Luftschiffahrt' enriched the festival programme of the ILA by organising an "aviation week" on the exhibition grounds. It became the first international aviation competition in Germany.

=== Frankfurt-Rebstock airfield ===
In 1911, the Frankfurt-Rebstock airfield was acquired by the Frankfurter Verein für Luftschiffahrt. The FVL thus became the operator of Frankfurt's first airport, even though in the beginning only balloons and airships landed here.

With the general annual meeting of the Frankfurter Verein für Luftschiffahrt on 10 December 1912, the merger with the Frankfurter Flugtechnische Verein was decided and the Frankfurter Verein für Luftschiffahrt was renamed Frankfurter Verein für Luftfahrt. This name has been preserved to this day.

Frankfurt am Main experienced a new sensation on September 30, 1929, when Fritz von Opel demonstrated the world's first independent rocket flight at the Rebstock airfield in Frankfurt. Initiated and organized by the Frankfurt Aviation Association, the legendary German giant flying boat DO-X with its twelve 500 hp engines and a wingspan of 48 metres landed on the Main west of Frankfurt in the same year.

=== Wartime ===
After the Nazi seizure of power, the Frankfurter Verein für Luftfahrt was "brought into line" with all other aviation associations. His considerable fortune was transferred to the Flight Sport Club Hessen-Nassau. All documents concerning the association's assets were destroyed.

=== After the war ===
The Cumulus Club for Technology, Sport and Meteorology was created on April 19, 1950, to maintain at least the tradition of aviation in Frankfurt and to keep the spirit of the sports community alive. His first chairman was Wachter. In this "aviatorless, terrible time" their comforts and encouragement came from Wolf Hirth, Jachtmann, Hanna Reitsch and Pruss. A spring festival served the purpose of social cohesion.

In addition, the re-establishment of the German Aero-Club in Frankfurt on 4 August 1950 was another important driving force behind the entire German aviation industry.

On August 1, 1951, when the balloon flight and gliding flight were approved by the Allied authorities, the Cumulus Club was renamed the "Frankfurter Verein für Luftfahrt" (Frankfurt Aviation Association) under its then chairman Richard Held.

On Sunday, 19 August 1951, Frankfurt had its first Rhine-Main gliding day, which was held under the auspices of Pan American World Airways in conjunction with the Frankfurt Association for Aviation and other associations.

On 22 June 1952, an International Mega-Flight Day was held at the Rhine-Main-Airport, organised by the association. He contributed to the fact that the Frankfurt Association for Aviation was able to attract many new members.

=== In Egelsbach ===
Motor flying was allowed again on May 6, 1955.

Already on 23 June 1955, the Frankfurter Verein für Luftfahrt bought a Piper Cub L 4 J from donations of members and contributions for DM 8,000.00 and resumed its motorised flight operations in Egelsbach, where the club had relocated its operations following the confiscation of Rebstock Airport as a result of the Second World War by the American occupation troops. Numerous volunteer flight instructors - mainly pilots from the Second World War - were available to teach theory and practice. They played a major role in causing the number of members to skyrocket.

From the end of the 1960s onwards, the Frankfurt Aviation Association had a fairly continuous membership of about 500 members. Of these, about 100 were members of the model aircraft. The training also went well. Due to the good training by volunteer flight instructors, up to 40 club members earned their pilot's license here each year. The association also held training courses for night flights, Alpine instruction in Innsbruck, the radiotelephone certificate, IFR licence and CPL II. Incidentally, the Bavarian politician and later finance minister of Germany, Franz Josef Strauß, also acquired his Instrument flight rules license here.

== Community service ==
The Frankfurter Verein für Luftfahrt together with other associations, airplanes and pilots based at Frankfurt-Egelsbach Airport provided airplanes and pilots at the AKHD Flugtag. This enabled around 30 families with their ill children of the Children's and Youth Hospital Service Frankfurt/Rhine-Main (AKHD) to make a sightseeing flight over the Rhine-Main region possible.

Every year on the weekend after St. Nicholas Day, the association organizes a children's night out at the airfield together with the police flying squadron in Hesse. Santa Claus flies with his angel to the airport by police helicopter and then distributes presents and biscuits to children from the area around the airport.

=== 110th anniversary ===
On 18 and 19 August 2018, 110 years after its foundation, the association organised an airfield festival in Egelsbach under the motto "reachable flying".

Together with Physikalischer Verein, this was also the occasion to hold a series of lectures on the subject in Frankfurt. Under the name "Der Traum vom Fliegen - Sterne, Wetter und BigData in der Luftfahrt" he continued the beginnings of the association when he regularly informed the citizens of Frankfurt about the weather and new experiences in flying.

== Famous members ==
- August Euler
- Alfred Wegener
- Albrecht von Bethmann
- Bruno Poelke
- Carl Oskar Ursinus
- Ernst Udet
- Franz Linke (founder, former chairman)
- Fritz von Opel
- Ferdinand von Zeppelin
- Franz Josef Strauß
- Gerhard Fieseler
- Hanna Reitsch
- Heinrich Kleyer
- Käthe Paulus
- Ludwig Landmann
- Leo Gans (former chairman)
- Max Pruss
- Michael Zacharias
- Richard Wachsmuth
- Werner Busch
- Willy Messerschmitt

== Model flight group ==
In 1949, the model flying group was founded in Frankfurt's aviation association. In 1960, the FVL purchased an area of 10,000 square metres for the model pilots in the Diedenbergen district. As early as 1961, a runway of 12 × 50 metres made of lime cement was built there. This material was not winterproof and therefore unsuitable for the purpose. In 1965, a new 25 × 75-metre asphalt runway was therefore built in Diedenbergen. A required building was leased for this purpose. In 1969 the access road from Weilbach to the model airfield was asphalted. In 1970, the Darmstadt Regional Council granted the club's Model Flight Group official permission for the use of the airspace on the Weilbach model airfield.

The importance of the model flying group in Frankfurt's aviation association grew steadily due to its sporting achievements. From 1970 onwards, the group made the national team participants available in uninterrupted succession. 7 club members became world champions. Model pilots were always among the best aerobatics and successfully represented the club at international competitions.
