= Oijen en Teeffelen =

Coordinates: 51.811586°N 5.495052°E

Coat of Arms

Oijen en Teeffelen was a municipality in the Dutch province of North Brabant. It included the villages of Oijen and Teeffelen.

The municipality existed until 1939, when it became part of Lith.
