= Jesse D. Auton =

United States Air Force General

Brigadier General Jesse D. Auton
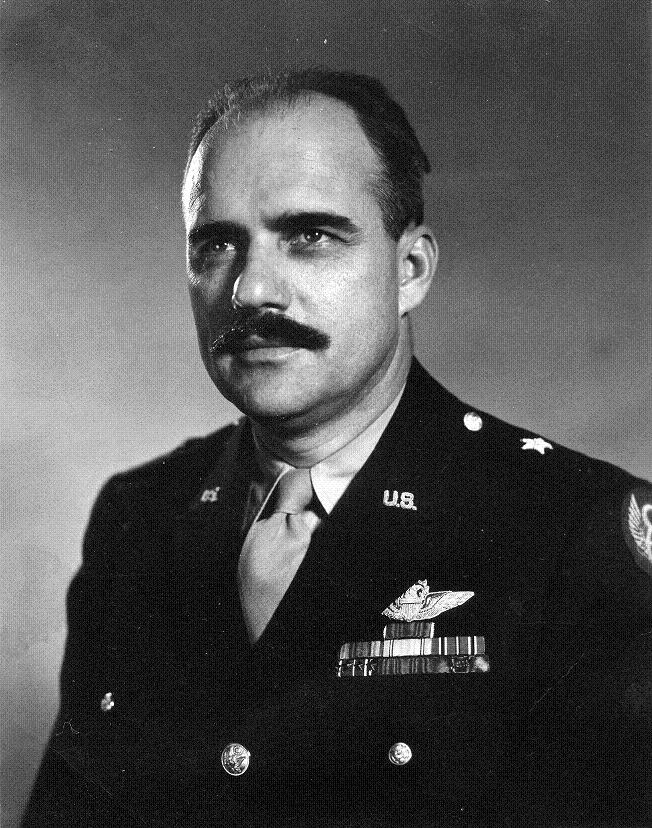
- Brigadier General Jesse D. Auton
- Born: December 1, 1904; Covington, Kentucky, U.S.
- Died: March 30, 1952 (aged 47); Offutt Air Force Base, U.S.
- Burial place: Arlington National Cemetery
- Military career
- Allegiance: United States
- Branch: United States Army Air Forces; United States Air Force
- Service years: 1928–1952
- Rank: Brigadier General
- Service number: O-17938
- Units: 65th Fighter Wing; 8th Air Force
- Commands: 20th Pursuit Group; San Francisco Air Defense Wing; 65th Fighter Wing; 313th Troop Carrier Wing
- Conflicts: Second World War; Korean War
- Awards: Legion of Merit with 1 oak leaf cluster; Distinguished Flying Cross; Bronze Star Medal; Purple Heart; Air Medal; American Campaign Medal; American Defense Medal; European-African-Middle Eastern Campaign Medal; Legion d'Honneur; Croix de Guerre (French); Croix de Guerre (Belgian)

Jesse D. Auton (December 1, 1904 – March 30, 1952) was a brigadier general in the United States Air Force.

== Early life and education ==
Jesse D. Auton was born on December 1, 1904, at Covington, Kentucky, to Robert Wesley and Julia E. [Bagby] Auton. However, he was raised a few minutes to the south in Piner. There, he was the valedictorian of the 1923 graduating class of Piner High School. He then attended Georgetown College, completing a Bachelor of Arts degree in 1927.

== Early career ==
Auton enlisted in the U.S. Army as an aviation cadet at Kentucky in 1928. After completing flight training, he was commissioned as second lieutenant in the Air Reserve in October 1929. Auton was subsequently commissioned as a second lieutenant in the Regular Army Air Corps in January 1930.

Auton was promoted to captain in January 1940 and graduated from the Army Industrial College in June 1940. At the White House, he served as an aide to President Franklin D. Roosevelt. Auton was promoted to major in March 1941 and became commander of the 20th Pursuit Group at Hamilton Field, California in August 1941.

== World War II ==
After the American entry into the Second World War, Auton's group was initially assigned to mainland defense and he was promoted to lieutenant colonel in January 1942. In August 1942, he was promoted to colonel and his group was redesignated the 20th Fighter Group. In January 1943, Auton became commander of the San Francisco Air Defense Wing. In April 1943, he became executive officer and acting commander of the Fourth Air Defense Wing.

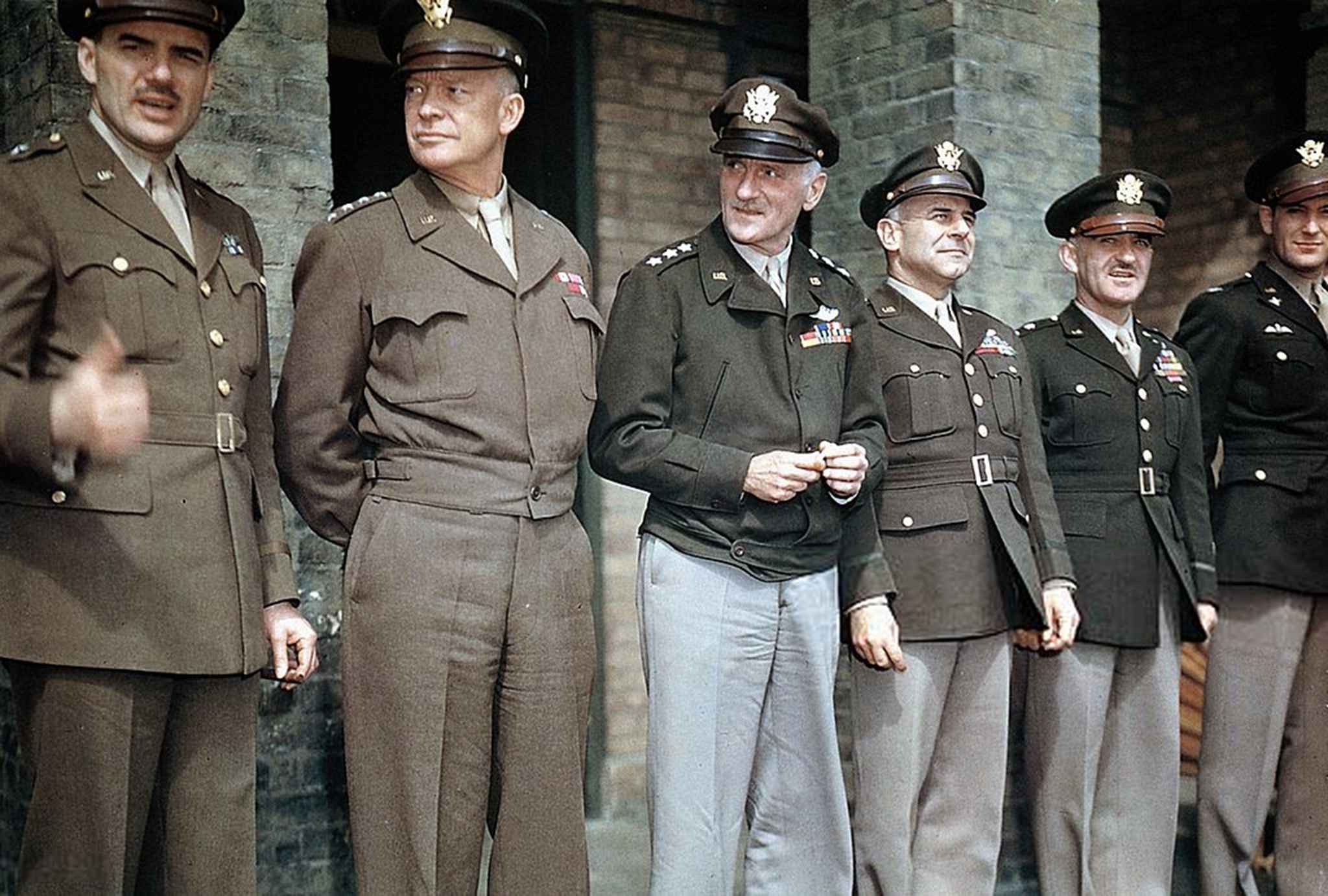
Brigadier General Jesse Auton, General Eisenhower, General Spaatz, General Doolittle, Major General William Kepner and Colonel Blakeslee.

The Fourth Air Defense Wing was transferred to the European Theatre of Operations in May 1943 and subsequently redesignated the 65th Fighter Wing. Auton became the wing commander in August 1943. During the conflict he flew 12 combat missions.

Auton served as a temporary brigadier general from March 1944 to January 1946 before reverting to the rank of colonel.

== Later career ==
In June 1947, Auton graduated from the Armed Forces Staff College. In October 1948, he became commander of the 313th Troop Carrier Wing in West Germany, participating in the Berlin Airlift.

In May 1950, Auton was appointed chief of the Fighter Division at the Strategic Air Command. In January 1951, he received a second award of the Legion of Merit for his contribution to the Far East Air Forces during the Korean War. In October 1951, Auton was again promoted to brigadier general.

== Death ==
Auton was killed on March 30, 1952, in a plane crash at Offutt Air Force Base, Omaha. He was the pilot of a twin-engine bomber returning to the base from California. An aide was also killed, but his co-pilot and two other crew members survived the crash. The plane was attempting to land after one of its two engines had failed. Auton was buried on April 7, 1952, at Arlington National Cemetery.

== See also ==
- Eighth Air Force
