= List of castles in Baden-Württemberg =

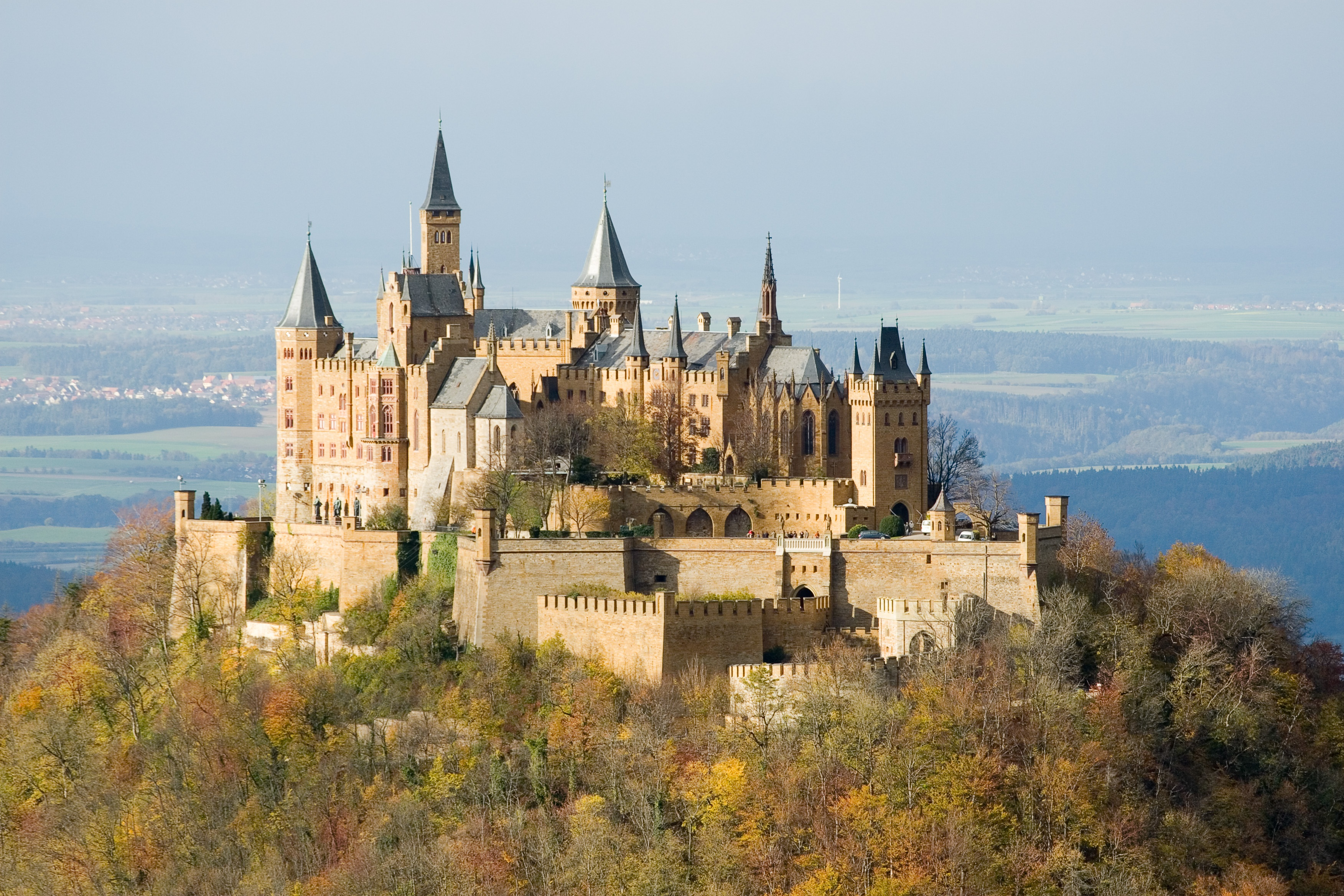
Hohenzollern Castle

Numerous castles can be found in the German state of Baden-Württemberg. These buildings, some of which have a history of over 1000 years, were the setting of historical events, domains of famous personalities and are still imposing buildings to this day.

This list encompasses castles described in German as Burg (castle), Festung (fort/fortress), Schloss (manor house) and Palais/Palast (palace). Many German castles after the Middle Ages were mainly built as royal or ducal palaces rather than as fortified buildings.

== Stuttgart ==
=== Stuttgart ===
Name	Image	Location	Type	Date	Notes
Altdischingen Castle		Weilimdorf 48°47′39.14″N 1°2′3″E	Burgstall	11th-12th Centuries	A ruined castle lying in the Stadtbezirk of Weilimdorf.
Altenburg Castle		Bad Cannstatt			A ruined castle located near Bad Cannstatt.
Bärenschlössle		Stuttgart-West 48°45′39″N 9°5′29.2″E	Hunting lodge	1768	A villa originally designed by Reinhard Heinrich Ferdinand Fischer for Duke Charles Eugene of Württemberg in 1768. The Bärenschlössle was demolished in 1793, but was rebuilt and the grounds were restored by King William I. Again the villa faced destruction during World War II in 1943 when a fire bomb struck the building and yet again in 1994, when the property burned to the ground. Today, the Bärenschlössle is a visitor center and a restaurant.
Berg Castle		Stuttgart-East 48°47′46″N 9°12′22″E	Burgstall	12th Century	A ruined 12th Century castle, demolished in 1287, located in Stuttgart-East.
Brie Castle		Bad-Cannstatt	Burg		
Crown Prince's Palace (Stuttgart)		Stuttgart 48°46′41.6″N 9°10′39.9″E	Demolished	1846–50	Built from 1846 to 1850 for the residence of the Crown Prince of Württemberg designed and built by Ludwig Friedrich Gaab under King Wilhelm I of Württemberg in high Renaissance style. After the abdication of the last King of Württemberg, the building was used as an exhibition hall in the 1920s and an art museum in the 1930s. The building was largely destroyed during the Bombing of Stuttgart in World War II, causing the building's complete demolition in 1963. Since 2005, the Kunstmuseum Stuttgart has stood in its place.
Dischingen Castle		Weilimdorf	Ruin		
Engelburg Castle		Mühlhausen 48°50′35.44″N 9°13′41.35″E	Ruin		
Frauenberg Castle		Feuerbach 48°48′5″N 9°9′33″E	Ruin		
Freienstein Castle		Münster 48°50′1.83″N 9°12′23.9″E	Ruin		
Gaisburg Castle		Gaisburg	Ruin		
Hedelfingen Castle		Hedelfingen 48°45′45.25″N 9°14′36.34″E	Ruin		
Heidenburg		Mühlhausen 48°50′38.93″N 9°13′51.75″E	Tower	c. 1200	
Heslach Castle		Heslach 48°45′15.86″N 9°8′53.75″E	Burgstall		
Hofen Castle		Hofen 48°50′18″N 9°13′44″E	Ruin		
Hohenheim Castle		Hohenheim 48°42′43″N 9°12′50.6″E	Schloss	1772–93	A castle built on commission by Charles Eugene for his wife Franziska von Hohenheim. Construction dragged on for 21 years, finally ending with the Duke's death in 1793. After a further 20 years of continued maintenance of the gardens surrounding the abandoned and decaying palace, King William I and his wife Catherine founded an agricultural school on the grounds of the palace in 1818. Today, after renovations lasting from 1967–1993, the castle holds the University of Hohenheim.
Kaltental Castle		Kaltental 48°44′26.37″N 9°7′54.11″E	Burgstall	1281	
Möhringen Castle (Stuttgart)		Möhringen 48°44′31.1″N 9°8′1″E	Burgstall	12th–15th centuries	
Mühlhausen Castle (Stuttgart)		Mühlhausen			
New Palace (Mühlhausen)		Mühlhausen			
New Palace (Stuttgart)		Stuttgart-Center 48°46′41″N 9°10′55″E	Schloss	1746–1807; 1958–64	The great palace of Duke Charles Eugene built for his rule and governance following his return from the court of the King of Prussia Frederick the Great in 1744. Construction began in 1744 and lasted until 1807, thanks to political and economic troubles, and was infrequently used by the Württembergs.
Old Castle (Stuttgart)		Stuttgart-Center 48°46′38″N 9°10′45″E	Castle	950	When Stuttgart was founded as a stud farm for Duke Liudolf of Swabia, a fortress was also built to protect the farm. From the 14th century onward, it became the residence of the Counts and later Dukes of Württemberg and their court. The castle was renovated in the late 16th century by two dukes, only to be extensively damaged by fire during the Second World War. Today, the castle houses the Landesmuseum Württemberg and a plaque dedicated to notable Swabian Claus von Stauffenberg.
Palm's Castle		Mühlhausen 48°50′38.4″N 9°13′45.4″E	Schloss	1813	
Plieningen Castle		Plieningen 48°42′7.8″N 9°12′50.3″E	Burgstall	c. 1200	
Rohr Castle		Vaihingen 48°43′2.2″N 9°16′13.6″E	Burgstall	c. 13th Century	
Rohreck Castle		Rohracker 48°45′31.32″N 9°12′40.68″E	Burgstall	1220–76	
Rosenstein Castle		Bad Cannstatt 48°48′3.6″N 9°12′21.6″E	Schloss	1822–30	A palace built for King William I by court architect Giovanni Salucci from 1822 to 1830. Today, it houses the State Museum of Natural History Stuttgart.
Castle Solitude		Stuttgart-West 48°47′13″N 9°5′3″E	Schloss	1763–67	A Rococo hunting retreat built for Duke Charles Eugene from 1763 to 1767 on a ridge near Stuttgart that overlooks the nearby towns of Weilimdorf, Gerlingen, and Leonberg. After a construction phase haunted by political drama, the Karlsschule opened here in 1770 and Friederich Schiller received some of his early education here. In the early 20th Century, the palace was abandoned and fell into disrepair. The castle was restored by the Federal Government from 1972–83 and today houses two schools and the Graevenitz Museum.
Stammheim Castle		Stammheim 48°50′56.1″N 9°9′30.9″E	1579–81	A medieval design by Heinrich Schickhardt built in the late 16th century. Today, it houses a nursery home.	
Stöckach Castle		Stuttgart			
Stuttgart Castle		Stuttgart			
Wilhelma		Bad Cannstatt 48°48′19″N 9°12′11″E	Palais		
Wilhelm Palais		Stuttgart-Center 48°46′34″N 9°11′3″E	Schloss	1834–40	
Wirtemberg Castle		Rotenberg 48°46′55.47″N 9°16′7.23″E	Ruins		

=== Landkreis Böblingen ===
1. Schloss Leonberg, Leonberg
2. Schloss Waldenbuch, Waldenbuch

=== Landkreis Esslingen ===
1. Burgruine Diepoldsburg (Obere Diepoldsburg & Burgruine Rauber), Gde. Lenningen
2. Burgruine Grötzingen, commune of Aichtal-Grötzingen
3. Burgruine Hahnenkamm, commune of Bissingen an der Teck
4. Burgruine Heimenstein, commune of Neidlingen
5. Burgruine Hohengutenberg, commune of Lenningen-Gutenberg
6. Hohenneuffen Castle, commune of Neuffen
7. Schloss Kirchheim (Teck), commune of Kirchheim unter Teck
8. Burgruine Lichteneck (Esslingen), commune of Weilheim/Teck
9. Ruine Lichtenstein, commune of Neidlingen
10. Burgruine Limburg, commune of Weilheim/Teck
11. Burg Neuenriet, commune of Altenriet
12. Burgruine Randeck, commune of Weilheim/Teck
13. Burgruine Reußenstein, commune of Neidlingen
14. Burgruine Schanbach, commune of Aichwald-Schanbach
15. Burgruine Sperberseck, commune of Lenningen
16. Burgruine Sulzburg, commune of Lenningen
17. Teck Castle, commune of Owen
18. Burgruine Turmberg (Aichelberg), commune of Aichelberg
19. Burgruine Wielandstein, commune of Lenningen
20. Burgruine Wuelstein, commune of Lenningen-Gutenberg

=== Landkreis Göppingen ===
1. Schloss Filseck, Uhingen
2. Helfenstein Castle, Geislingen an der Steige
3. Hiltenburg Castle, Bad Ditzenbach
4. Hohenstaufen Castle, Göppingen
5. Landsöhr Castle, Bad Boll (burgstall)
6. Leimburg Castle, Gruibingen/Auendorf
7. Ramsberg Castle, Donzdorf
8. Staufeneck Castle, Salach
9. Wäscherschloss, Wäschenbeuren
10. Schloss Weißenstein, Lauterstein

=== Landkreis Ludwigsburg ===
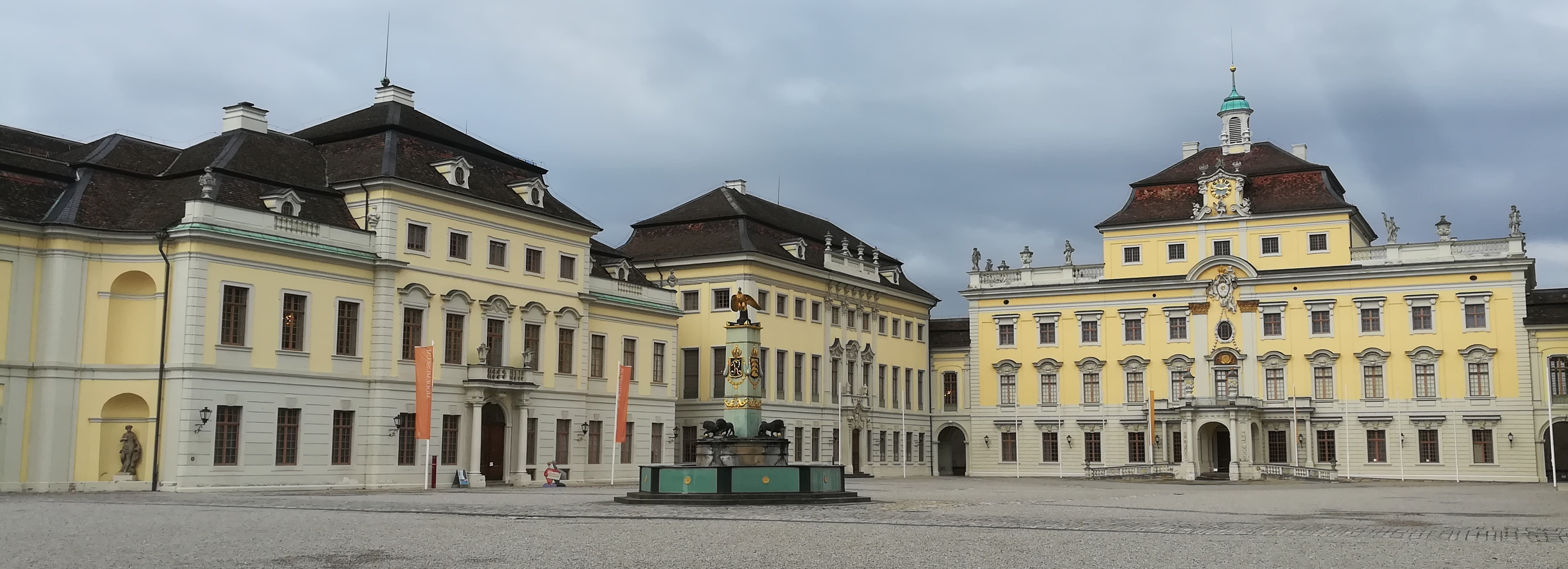
Ludwigsburg Palace, inner courtyard

1. Favorite Castle, Ludwigsburg
2. Ludwigsburg Palace, Ludwigsburg
3. Monrepos Palace, Ludwigsburg
4. Festung Hohenasperg, Asperg
5. Nippenburg, Schwieberdingen
6. Burg Lichtenberg, Oberstenfeld
7. Burg Alt-Sachsenheim, Sachsenheim
8. Schaubeck Castle, Steinheim an der Murr, Kleinbottwar

=== Rems-Murr-Kreis ===
1. Alfdorf Manor

=== Heilbronn ===
1. Trappenseeschlösschen
2. Deutschordensschloss Kirchhausen, Kirchhausen

=== Landkreis Heilbronn ===
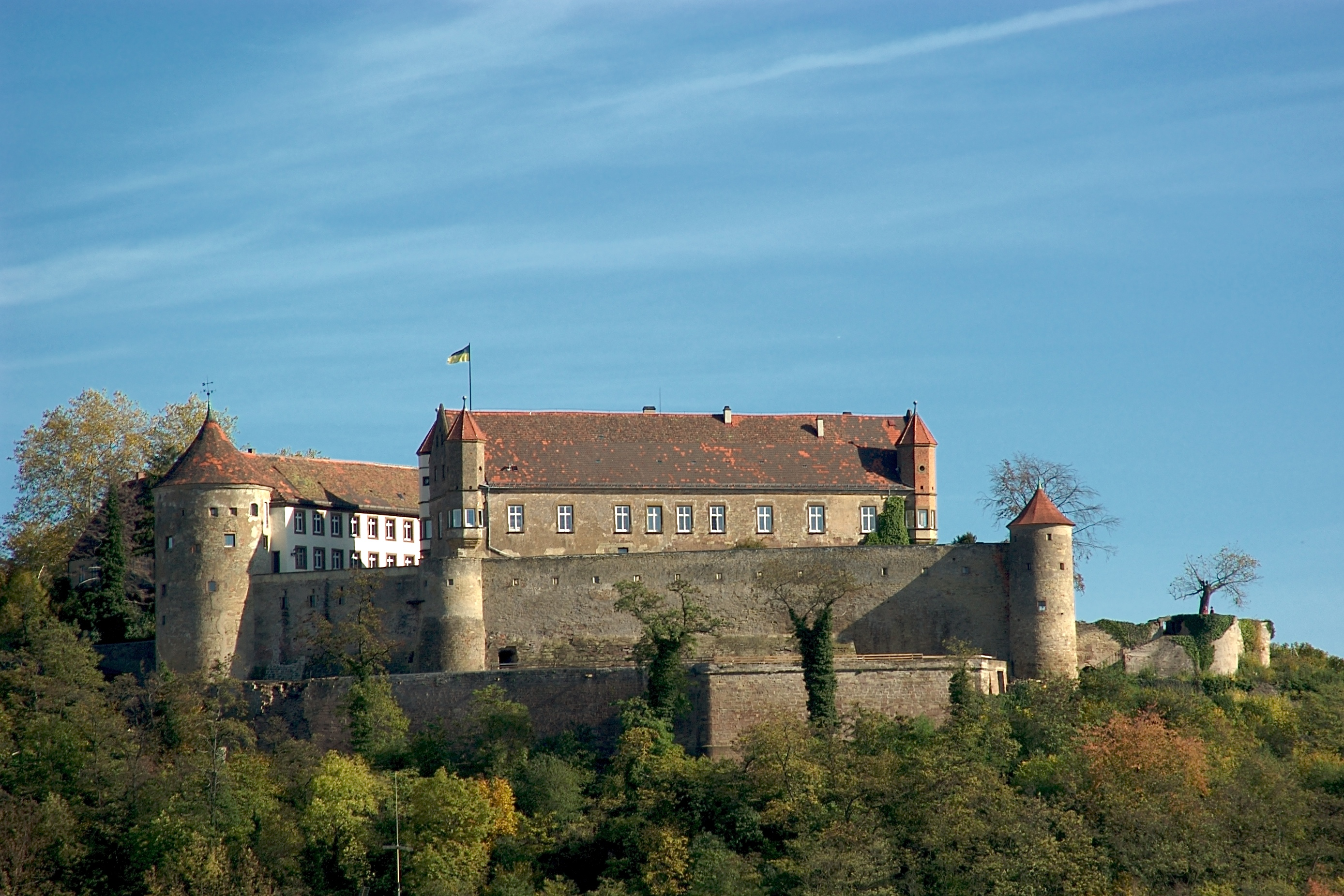
Stettenfels Castle

1. Schloss Affaltrach, Obersulm-Affaltrach
2. Schloss Assumstadt, Möckmühl-Züttlingen
3. Schlössle Auenstein, Ilsfeld-Auenstein
4. Schloss Babstadt, Bad Rappenau-Babstadt
5. Wasserschloss Bad Rappenau, Bad Rappenau
6. Burg Blankenhorn, Güglingen-Eibensbach
7. Oberes Schloss Bonfeld, Bad Rappenau-Bonfeld
8. Schloss Brackenheim, Brackenheim
9. Schloss Bürg, Neuenstadt am Kocher-Bürg
10. Schlösschen Brettach, Langenbrettach-Brettach
11. Schloss Domeneck, Möckmühl-Züttlingen
12. Burg Duttenberg, Bad Friedrichshall-Duttenberg
13. Burg Ehrenberg, Bad Rappenau-Heinsheim
14. Ottilienberg, Eppingen
15. Schloss Eschenau, Eschenau
16. Schloss Fürfeld, Bad Rappenau-Fürfeld
17. Unteres Schloss Gemmingen, Gemmingen
18. Greckenschloss Kochendorf, Bad Friedrichshall-Kochendorf
19. Schloss Grombach, Bad Rappenau-Grombach
20. Schloss Heinsheim, Bad Rappenau-Heinsheim
21. Burgruine Helfenberg, Ilsfeld-Auenstein
22. Burgruine Heriboldisburg, Neudenau-Herbolzheim
23. Schloss Heuchlingen, Bad Friedrichshall-Heuchlingen
24. Hohenbeilstein, Beilstein
25. Schloss Horneck, Gundelsheim
26. Schloss Ittlingen, Ittlingen
27. Götzenburg Jagsthausen, Jagsthausen
28. Rotes Schloss Jagsthausen, Jagsthausen
29. Weißes Schloss Jagsthausen, Jagsthausen
30. Wasserburg Lauffen, Lauffen am Neckar
31. Wasserschloss Lautereck, Löwenstein-Teusserbad
32. Schloss Lehen, Bad Friedrichshall-Kochendorf
33. Schloss Lehrensteinsfeld, Lehrensteinsfeld
34. Schloss Liebenstein, Neckarwestheim
35. Burgruine Löwenstein, Löwenstein
36. Schloss Magenheim, Cleebronn
37. Burg Maienfels, Wüstenrot-Maienfels
38. Schloss Massenbach, Schwaigern-Massenbach
39. Schloss Michelbach, Zaberfeld-Michelbach
40. Burg Möckmühl, Möckmühl
41. Deutschordensschloss Neckarsulm, Neckarsulm
42. Burg Neipperg, Brackenheim-Neipperg
43. Schloss Neudenau, Neudenau
44. Schloss Neuenstadt, Neuenstadt am Kocher
45. Schloss Obergimpern, Bad Rappenau-Obergimpern
46. Burg Ochsenburg, Zaberfeld-Ochsenburg
47. Bautzenschloss Oedheim, Oedheim
48. Schloss Presteneck, Neuenstadt am Kocher-Stein am Kocher
49. Schloss Rohrbach, Eppingen-Rohrbach am Gießhübel
50. Schloss Schomberg, Gemmingen-Stebbach
51. Schloss Schwaigern, Schwaigern
52. Schloss Siegelsbach, Siegelsbach
53. St. Andrésches Schlösschen, Bad Friedrichshall-Kochendorf
54. Stettenfels Castle, Untergruppenbach
55. Schloss Stocksberg, Brackenheim-Stockheim
56. Burg Streichenberg, Gemmingen-Stebbach
57. Oberes Schloss Talheim, Talheim
58. Unteres Schloss Talheim, Talheim
59. Schloss Weiler, Obersulm-Weiler
60. Burgruine Weibertreu, Weinsberg
61. Schloss Widdern, Widdern
62. Burg Wildeck, Abstatt
63. Schloss Zaberfeld, Zaberfeld

=== Hohenlohekreis ===
1. Burgruine Lichteneck (Hohenlohekresis), Ingelfingen
2. Schloss Neuenstein, Neuenstein
3. Schloss Waldenburg, Waldenburg, Baden-Württemberg

=== Main-Tauber-Kreis ===
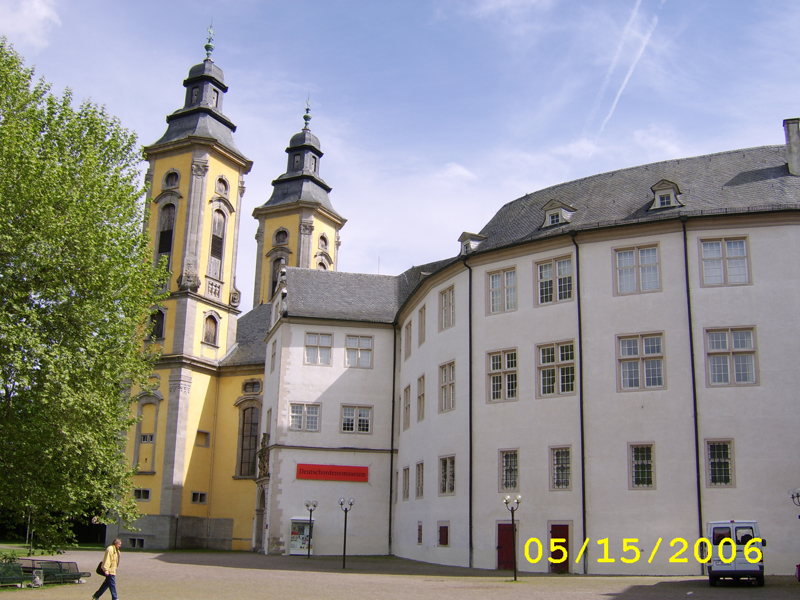
Deutschordensschloss in Bad Mergentheim

1. Deutschordensschloss Mergentheim, Bad Mergentheim
2. Freudenberg Castle, Freudenberg
3. Gamburg Castle, Gamburg
4. Neuhaus Castle, Igersheim
5. Weikersheim Castle, Weikersheim
6. Wertheim Castle, Wertheim

=== Landkreis Schwäbisch Hall ===
1. Alt-Bartenstein Castle, Schrozberg-Riedbach
2. Wasserburg Altenhausen, Schwäbisch Hall-Altenhausen
3. Altes Schloss (Gaildorf), Gaildorf
4. Amlishagen Castle, Gerabronn
5. Bachenstein Castle, Schrozberg-Bartenstein
6. Schloss Bartenstein, Schrozberg-Bartenstein
7. Burgruine Bebenburg, Rot am See-Kleinbrettheim
8. Schlossruine Bielriet, Schwäbisch Hall-Wolpertsdorf
9. Schloss Braunsbach, Braunsbach
10. Burg Buch, Schwäbisch Hall-Buch
11. Burgruine Buchhorn, Michelbach an der Bilz
12. Schloss Burleswagen, Satteldorf-Burleswagen
13. Schloss Döttingen, Braunsbach-Döttingen
14. Burg Eichholz, Schrozberg-Eichholz
15. Wasserschloss Eltershofen, Schwäbisch Hall-Eltershofen
16. Burg Enningen, Braunsbach
17. Eulenburg Castle, Crailsheim-Auhof
18. Wasserburg Flügelau Crailsheim-Roßfeld
19. Burg Flyhöhe, Blaufelden
20. Schloss Gammesfeld, Blaufelden-Gammesfeld
21. Burgruine Geyersburg, Schwäbisch Hall-Gelbingen
22. Schloss Gröningen, Satteldorf-Gröningen
23. Burg Haßfelden, Wolpertshausen-Haßfelden
24. Wasserschloss Herboldshausen, Kirchberg-Herboldshausen
25. Burg Herrentierbach, Blaufelden-Herrentierbach
26. Hertenstein Castle, Blaufelden-Billingsbach
27. Wasserschloss Honhardt, Frankenhardt
28. Burg Hohenkressberg, Kressberg-Hohenkressberg
29. Burgruine Hohenstatt (Hohenstadt), Schwäbisch Hall-Neunbronn
30. Burgruine Hohenstadt, Schwäbisch Hall-Neunbronn
31. Burgruine Hohenstein, Schwäbisch Hall-Hohenstadt
32. Burgruine Hopfach
33. Hornberg Castle (Hornberg an der Jagst), Kirchberg an der Jagst
34. Burg Katzenstein, Langenburg-Hürden
35. Schloss Kirchberg, Kirchberg an der Jagst
36. Burgruine Klingenfels, Ilshofen-Steinbächle
37. Wasserburg Kottspiel, Bühlertann-Kottspiel
38. Burgruine Kranzberg, Sulzbach-Laufen
39. Schloss Langenburg, Langenburg
40. Burgruine Leofels, Ilshofen
41. Burgruine Limpurg, Schwäbisch Hall
42. Burg Lobenhausen, Kirchberg-Lobenhausen
43. Burg Lohr, Jagstheim-Lohr
44. Burgruine Löwenburg, Braunsbach-Bühlerzimmern
45. Schloss Michelbach, Michelbach an der Bilz
46. Schloss Morstein, Gerabronn
47. Burgruine Neuberg, Vellberg-Talheim
48. Neuburg, Schwäbisch Hall-Gelbingen
49. Schloss Obersontheim, Obersontheim
50. Pfannenburg, Jagstheim
51. Wasserburg Ramsbach, Schwäbisch Hall-Ramsbach
52. Rappenburg, Stimpfach
53. Schloss Rechenberg, Stimpfach
54. Burg Riedbach, Schrozberg-Riedbach
55. Burg Rötenberg, Fichtenberg-Mittelrot
56. Schloss Schmiedelfeld, Sulzbach-Laufen
57. Burg Schönebürg, Crailsheim-Goldbach
58. Schloss Schrozberg, Schrozberg
59. Schrozburg, Schrozberg
60. Suhlburg, Untermünkheim-Suhlburg
61. Tannenburg, Bühlertann-Tannenburg
62. Schloss Tierberg, Braunsbach-Tierberg
63. Wasserburg Untermünkheim, Untermünkheim
64. Burg Unterscheffach, Wolpertshausen-Unterscheffach
65. Burgstall Unterscheffach, Wolpertshausen-Unterscheffach
66. Wasserburg Unterscheffach, Wolpertshausen-Unterscheffach
67. Schloss Vellberg, Vellberg
68. Burgruine Werdeck, Rot am See-Werdeck
69. Schloss Wildenstein, Fichtenau
70. Burg Wolkenstein, Sulzbach-Laufen-Altschmiedelfeld

=== Landkreis Heidenheim ===
1. Ballmertshofen Castle, Dischingen
2. Brenz Castle, Brenz an der Brenz
3. Schlössle, Brenz an der Brenz
4. Burgstall Burstel (Sontheim an der Brenz), Sontheim an der Brenz
5. Jagdschloss Duttenstein, Dischingen
6. Eselsburg Castle, Herbrechtingen
7. Falkenstein Castle, Gerstetten
8. Güssenburg Castle, Hermaringen
9. Hellenstein Castle, Heidenheim an der Brenz
10. Hurwang Castle, Heidenheim an der Brenz
11. Kaltenburg Castle, Niederstotzingen
12. Katzenstein Castle, Dischingen
13. Schloss Niederstotzingen, Niederstotzingen
14. Schloss Oberstotzingen, Niederstotzingen
15. Schloss Schnaitheim, Heidenheim an der Brenz
16. Schloss Stetten ob Lontal, Niederstotzingen
17. Schloss Taxis, Dischingen

=== Ostalbkreis ===
1. Aalenkastell, Aalen
2. Schloss Adelmannsfelden, Adelmannsfelden
3. Alte Bürg, Riesbürg-Utzmemmingen, Reste der Burganlage
4. Schloss Baldern (Hohenbaldern), Bopfingen-Baldern
5. Schloss Böbingen, Böbingen an der Rems
6. Schloss Dambach, Stödtlen-Dambach
7. Schloss Dorotheenhof (Oberburg, Oberes Schloss, Degenfeld'sches Schlösschen), Essingen (Württemberg)
8. Schloss Ellwangen, Ellwangen (Jagst)
9. Schloss Essingen (Degenfeldsches Schloss), Essingen (Württemberg)
10. Schloss Essingen, Essingen (Württemberg)
11. Schloss Essingen (Unteres Schloss, Woellwarther Schloss), Essingen (Württemberg)
12. Schloss Fachsenfeld, Aalen-Fachsenfeld
13. Flochberg Castle, Bopfingen-Flochberg
14. Gromberg Castle, Lauchheim, ruins (surviving: bergfried, shield wall)
15. Schloss Heubach, Heubach
16. Hohenalfingen Castle, Aalen-Hohenalfingen, Ruine (surviving: remains of the bergfried, remains of the mantlet wall)
17. Burg Hohenrechberg (Rechberg), Schwäbisch Gmünd-Rechberg, Ruine (erhalten: Umfassungsmauern, Torbau)
18. Schloss Hohenroden (Roden, Alt Roden), Essingen (Württemberg)-Hohenroden
19. Schloss Hohenstadt, Abtsgmünd-Hohenstadt
20. Schloss Kapfenburg, Lauchheim
21. Schloss Laubach, Abtsgmünd-Laubach
22. Lauterburg Castle, Essingen-Lauterburg
23. Turmhügelburg Leinroden (Roden), Abtsgmünd-Leinroden, Turmhügelburg der Stauferzeit
24. Schloss Leinzell (Langsches Schloss), Leinzell
25. Schloss Lindach (Neulaymingen), Schwäbisch Gmünd-Lindach
26. Schloss Neubronn, Abtsgmünd-Neubronn
27. Niederalfingen Castle (Marienburg, Fuggerschloss), Hüttlingen (Württemberg)-Niederalfingen
28. Rosenstein Castle, Heubach
29. Schloss Schechingen, Schechingen
30. Schenkenstein Castle, Bopfingen-Aufhausen, Ruine (erhalten: Bergfried, Mauerreste)
31. Schloss Tannhausen, Tannhausen
32. Schloss Untergröningen, Untergröningen
33. Schloss Unterschneidheim, Unterschneidheim, remains of an old Teutonic Order castle
34. Schloss Utzmemmingen (Vohenstein'sches Schloss), Riesbürg-Utzmemmingen
35. Schloss Wagenhofen, Westhausen (Württemberg)
36. Waldau Castle, Schwäbisch Gmünd-Waldau
37. Schloss Wasseralfingen, Aalen-Wasseralfingen
38. Wöllstein Castle (Wöllstein), Abtsgmünd, ruins (surviving chapel)
39. Schloss Wört (Werde, Wörth), Wört
40. Stolch'sches Schloss, (Trochtelfingen, Teilort von) Bopfingen

== Karlsruhe ==
=== Baden-Baden ===
1. New Castle
2. Schloss Hohenbaden (Altes Schloss)
3. Yburg, Neuweier
4. Alt-Eberstein Castle, Ebersteinburg
5. Schloss Seelach
6. Cäcilienberg Castle
7. Schloss Neuweier, Neuweier
8. Baden-Baden Hunting Lodge

=== Karlsruhe ===
1. Schloss Augustenburg
2. Schloss Gottesaue
3. Schloss Karlsburg
4. Karlsruhe Palace
5. Gut Scheibenhardt

=== Landkreis Karlsruhe ===
1. Schloss Bruchsal, Bruchsal
2. Schloss Ettlingen, Ettlingen
3. Schloss Gochsheim, Kraichtal
4. Schloss Kislau, Bad Schönborn
5. Burg Ravensburg, Sulzfeld (Baden)
6. Schloss Stutensee, Stutensee
7. Waldenfels Castle, Malsch

=== Landkreis Rastatt ===
1. Old Windeck Castle, Bühl
2. Schloss Bach, Bühl
3. Schloss Favorite (Rastatt), Rastatt
4. Schloss Neusatz, Bühl
5. Pagodenburg, Rastatt
6. Schloss Rastatt, Rastatt
7. Schloss Rittersbach, Bühl

=== Heidelberg ===
1. Heidelberg Castle
2. Handschuhsheim Castle (Tiefburg)
3. Schloss Rohrbach

=== Mannheim ===
1. Eichelsheim Castle
2. Mannheim Palace
3. Bretzenheim Palace
4. Schloss Seckenheim

=== Neckar-Odenwald-Kreis ===
1. Dauchstein Castle, Binau
2. Guttenberg Castle, Haßmersheim
3. Schloss Hardheim, Hardheim
4. Hornberg Castle, Neckarzimmern
5. Lohrbach Castle, Mosbach
6. Mosbach Castle, Mosbach Baden
7. Minneburg, Neckargerach
8. Schweinberg Castle, Hardheim
9. Zwingenberg Castle, Zwingenberg

=== Rhein-Neckar-Kreis ===
1. Dilsberg Fortress, Neckargemünd
2. Eberbach Castle, Eberbach
3. Hirschburg Castle, Hirschberg an der Bergstraße
4. Reichenstein Castle, Neckargemünd
5. Schauenburg Castle, Dossenheim
6. Schwetzingen Castle, Schwetzingen
7. Steinsberg Castle, Sinsheim
8. Stolzeneck Castle, Eberbach
9. Strahlenburg, Schriesheim
10. Wachenburg, Weinheim
11. Weinheimer Schloss, Weinheim
12. Windeck Castle, Weinheim
13. Neidenstein Fortress, Neidenstein

=== Landkreis Calw ===
1. Hunting lodge of Hirsau Abbey, Calw
2. Hohennagold Castle, Nagold
3. Liebenzell Castle, Bad Liebenzell
4. Zavelstein Castle, Bad Teinach-Zavelstein
5. Waldeck Castle, Calw

=== Pforzheim ===
1. Kräheneck Castle
2. Rabeneck Castle
3. Liebeneck Castle

=== Enzkreis ===
1. Schloss Neuenbürg, Neuenbürg
2. Straubenhardt Castle, Neuenbürg
3. Waldenburg Castle, Neuenbürg

=== Landkreis Freudenstadt ===
1. Schloss Mühringen, Horb
2. Rinkenwall, Baiersbronn
3. Tannenfels Castle, Mitteltal

== Freiburg ==
=== Freiburg im Breisgau ===
1. Colombischlössle Freiburg
2. Schloss Ebnet
3. Schneeburg
4. Zähringen Castle

=== Landkreis Breisgau-Hochschwarzwald ===
1. Alt-Urach Castle, Lenzkirch
2. Baden Castle/Badenweiler Castle, Badenweiler
3. Falkenstein Castle, Buchenbach
4. Hauenfels Castle, Ehrenstetten
5. Höhingen Castle, Achkarren
6. Jesuitenschloss, Merzhausen
7. Malteserschloss, Heitersheim
8. Neuenfels Castle, Müllheim (Baden)
9. Staufen Castle, Staufen im Breisgau
10. Wiesneck Castle, Buchenbach-Wiesneck

=== Landkreis Emmendingen ===
1. Unteres Schloss Hecklingen, Kenzingen
2. Altes Schloss Heimbach, Teningen
3. Neues Schloss Heimbach, Teningen
4. Burgruine Hochburg, Emmendingen
5. Kastelburg, Waldkirch
6. Landeck Castle, Emmendingen
7. Lichteneck Castle, Kenzingen
8. Markgrafenschloss, Emmendingen
9. Schwarzenburg, Waldkirch
10. Sponeck Castle, Jechtingen

=== Ortenaukreis ===
1. Ruine Alt-Geroldseck (Rauhkasten), Schönberg (Gemeinde Seelbach)
2. Schloss Dautenstein, Seelbach
3. Hohengeroldseck Castle, Seelbach
4. Schloss Hornberg, Hornberg
5. Husen Castle, Hausach
6. Lützelhardt Castle, Seelbach
7. Mahlberg Castle, Mahlberg
8. Schloss Ortenberg, Ortenberg
9. Schauenburg, Oberkirch
10. Schloss Wolfach, Wolfach
11. Wolfach Castle, Oberwolfach
12. Neu-Windeck Castle, Lauf

=== Landkreis Rottweil ===
1. Albeck Castle, Sulz am Neckar
2. Falkenstein Castle, Schramberg
3. Wasserschloss Glatt in Glatt (Stadt Sulz am Neckar)
4. Herrenzimmern Castle, Bösingen
5. Hohenschramberg Castle, Schramberg
6. Lichtenfels Castle, Dornhan
7. Schloss Leinstetten, Leinstetten
8. Schloss Lichtenegg in Harthausen (Gemeinde Epfendorf)
9. Schenkenburg, Schenkenzell
10. Schiltach Castle, Schiltach
11. Schilteck Castle, Schramberg
12. Wehrstein Castle in Fischingen (Stadt Sulz am Neckar)
13. Willenburg, Schiltach

=== Schwarzwald-Baar-Kreis ===
1. Bärenberg Castle (Weiberzahn), Königsfeld im Schwarzwald
2. Burgberg Castle, Königsfeld im Schwarzwald
3. Entenburg Castle, Donaueschingen-Pfohren
4. Granegg Castle, Niedereschach
5. Waldau Castle, Königsfeld im Schwarzwald

=== Landkreis Tuttlingen ===
1. Altfridingen Castle, Fridingen an der Donau
2. Altrietheim Castle, Rietheim-Weilheim
3. Bachtal Castle, Buchheim
4. Baldenberg Castle, Spaichingen
5. Bärenthal Castle, Bärenthal
6. Burgstall Castle, Fridingen an der Donau
7. Burgstallhöhle Castle, Fridingen an der Donau
8. Bräunisburg Castle, Mühlheim
9. Schloss Bronnen, Fridingen an der Donau
10. Deilingen Castle, Deilingen
11. Emmingen Castle, Emmingen-Liptingen
12. Espach Castle, Mühlheim
13. Fürstenstein Castle, Rietheim-Weihlheim
14. Granegg Castle, Egesheim
15. Höhle im Kaiserstandsfelsen, Buchheim
16. Honberg Castle, Tuttlingen
17. Hohenkarpfen, Hausen ob Verena
18. Kallenberg Castle, Buchheim
19. Schloss Immendingen, Immendingen
20. Hewenegg Castle, Immendingen
21. Konzenberg Castle, Wurmlingen
22. Kraftstein Castle, Mühlheim
23. Krinnerfels Castle, Fridingen an der Donau
24. Lengenfels Castle, Bärenthal
25. Luginsfeld Castle, Tuttlingen
26. Lupfen Castle, Talheim
27. Möhringen Castle, Tuttlingen
28. Schloss Möhringen, Tuttlingen
29. Schloss Mühlheim, Mühlheim
30. Reiffenberg Castle, Trossingen
31. Schloss Rietheim, Rietheim Weilheim
32. Rockenbusch Castle, Buchheim
33. Schallon Castle, Rietheim-Weilheim
34. Schwandorf Castle, Neuhausen ob Eck
35. Stiegelesfels Castle, Fridingen an der Donau
36. Sunthausen Castle, Immendingen
37. Wallenburg Castle, Dürbheim
38. Wasserburg Castle, Tuttlingen
39. Walterstein Castle, Kolbingen
40. Wartenberg Castle, Geisingen
41. Schloss Wartenberg, Geisingen
42. Wehingen Castle, Wehingen
43. Ziegelhöhlenburg Castle, Fridingen an der Donau

=== Landkreis Konstanz ===
1. Alter Turm Aach, Aach
2. Bodman Castle, Bodman-Ludwigshafen
3. Schloss Bodman, Bodman-Ludwigshafen
4. Friedinger Schlössle, Singen
5. Hohenfels Castle (Hohenfels), Hohenfels
6. Hohenhewen Castle, Engen
7. Hohenkrähen Castle, Mühlhausen-Ehingen
8. Honstetten Castle, Eigeltingen
9. Hohenstoffeln, Hilzingen
10. Hohentwiel Castle, Singen
11. Homburg Castle, Radolfzell am Bodensee
12. Kargegg Castle, Allensbach
13. Mägdeberg Castle, Mühlhausen-Ehingen
14. Nellenburg, Stockach
15. Neuhewen Castle, Engen
16. Tudoburg, Eigeltingen
17. Schloss Espasingen (Bodmannsches Schloss), Espasingen
18. Möggingen Castle Radolfzell-Möggingen

=== Landkreis Lörrach ===
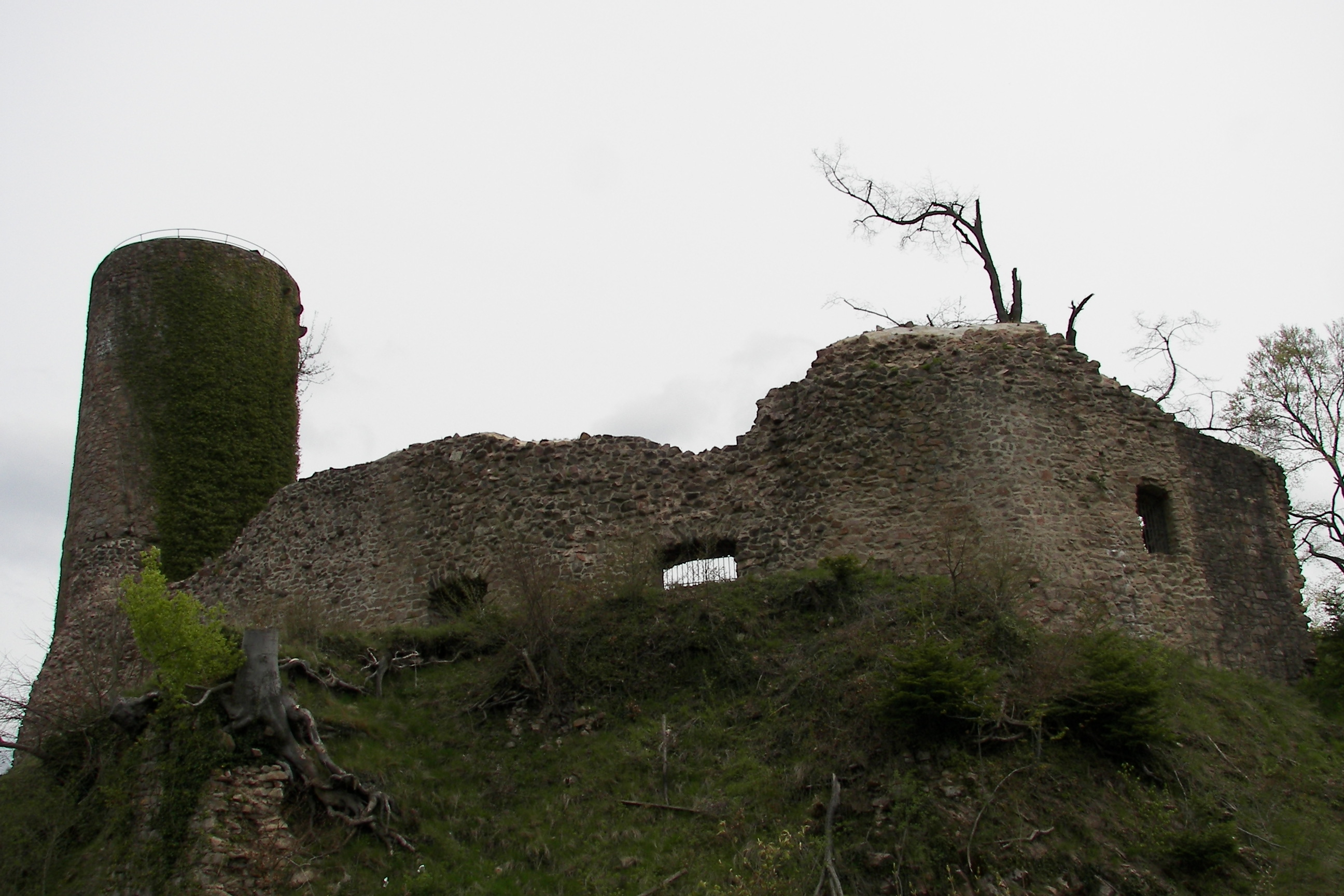
The ruins of Sausenburg Castle in the spring

1. Schloss Beuggen, Rheinfelden (Baden)
2. Istein Castle (Isteiner Klotz), Efringen-Kirchen
3. Inzlinger Wasserschloss, Inzlingen
4. Rötteln Castle, Lörrach
5. Rotenburg Castle, Wieslet
6. Sausenburg Castle, Kandern
7. Schloss Bürgeln, Schliengen
8. Entenstein Castle, Schliengen
9. Stockburg Castle, Malsburg-Marzell

=== Landkreis Waldshut ===
1. Gutenburg (Hochrhein), Waldshut-Tiengen
2. Hauenstein Castle (Hauenstein), Laufenburg-Hauenstein
3. Küssaburg, Küssaberg
4. Neu-Tannegg Castle (Boll), Bonndorf
5. Rotwasserstelz Castle (also: Schloss Rötteln), Hohentengen am Hochrhein
6. Weisswasserstelz Castle, Hohentengen am Hochrhein
7. Roggenbach Castle, Bonndorf
8. Steinegg Castle, Bonndorf
9. Schloss Hohenlupfen, Stühlingen
10. Trompeterschlösschen, Bad Säckingen
11. Wieladingen Castle, Rickenbach

== Regierungsbezirk Tübingen ==
=== Landkreis Reutlingen ===
1. Achalm Castle, Reutlingen
2. Alte Burg, Trochtelfingen
3. Ruine Alt-Ehrenfels (Ehrenfels), Hayingen
4. Altenburg, Reutlingen-Altenburg
5. Burg Alt-Lichtenstein (Alter Lichtenstein), Lichtenstein-Honau
6. Burg Alt-Hayingen, Hayingen-Indelhausen
7. Burg Baach (Bach), Zwiefalten-Baach
8. Burg Baldeck, Bad Urach-Wittlingen
9. Burg Baldelau, Gomadingen-Wasserstetten
10. Burg Bichishausen, Münsingen-Bichishausen
11. Burg Blankenhorn, Bad Urach
12. Ruine Blankenstein, Gomadingen-Wasserstetten
13. Burg Bronnweiler, Reutlingen-Bronnweiler
14. Burg Burgstein, Lichtenstein-Unterhausen
15. Burg Buttenhausen, Münsingen-Buttenhausen
16. Schloss Buttenhausen, Münsingen-Buttenhausen
17. Ruine Dapfen, Gomadingen-Marbach
18. Burg Derneck (Degeneck), Hayingen
19. Schloss Ehestetten, Hayingen-Ehestetten
20. Burg Erpfingen, Sonnenbühl-Erpfingen
21. Burgrest Fischburg, Bad Urach
22. Genkingen Castle (Steinhaus), Sonnenbühl-Genkingen
23. Burgstall Genkingen, Sonnenbühl-Genkingen
24. Gomadingen Castle, Gomadingen
25. Schloss Grafeneck, Gomadingen-Dapfen
26. Ruine Greifenstein, Lichtenstein
27. Schloss Großengstingen (Prälatenschloss), Engstingen-Großengstingen
28. Burg Haideck, Trochtelfingen
29. Burg Heidengraben, Grabenstetten
30. Heunenburg, Zwiefalten
31. Burg Hielock, Trochtelfingen-Mägerkingen
32. Burg Hochbiedeck, Lichtenstein
33. Ruine Hofen, Grabenstetten
34. Burg Hohenenkingen, Sonnenbühl
35. Ruine Hohenerpfingen (Erpfingen), Sonnenbühl-Erpfingen
36. Burg Hohengenkingen, Sonnenbühl-Genkingen
37. Burg Hohengundelfingen, Münsingen
38. Burg Hohenhundersingen, Münsingen-Hundersingen
39. Burg Hohenstein, Hohenstein
40. Hohenurach Castle, Bad Urach
41. Burg Hohenwittlingen (Wittlingen), Bad Urach-Wittlingen
42. Burg Hohloch, Münsingen
43. Burg Hugenberg, Reutlingen-Bronnweiler
44. Imenburg, Lichtenstein-Unterhausen
45. Lichtenstein Castle, Lichtenstein
46. Burg Littstein (Hohenlittstein), Bad Urach
47. Ruine Maisenburg, Hayingen-Indelhausen
48. Burg Meidelstetten, Hohenstein
49. Schloss Münsingen (Altes Schloss), Münsingen
50. Schloss Neuehrenfels (Ehrenfels), Hayingen
51. Ruine Niedergundelfingen, Münsingen-Gundelfingen
52. Ödenburg (Oberstetten), Hohenstein-Oberstetten
53. Burg Pfälen, Bad Urach
54. Burg Pfullingen (Obere Burg), Pfullingen
55. Schloss Pfullingen (Schlössle), Pfullingen
56. Jagdschloss Pfullingen (Rempenburg, Untere Burg), Pfullingen
57. Burg Reichenau, Münsingen
58. Burg Rieder, Zwiefalten-Baach
59. Schloss Rübgarten, Pliezhausen-Rübgarten
60. Burg Runder Berg, Bad Urach
61. Schalggenburg, Wannweil
62. Burg Schorren (Venedigerloch), Bad Urach
63. Ruine Schülzburg (Schiltenburg), Hayingen-Anhausen
64. Burg Seeburg, Bad Urach-Seeburg
65. Burg Sonderbuch (Schlossberg), Zwiefalten-Sonderbuch
66. Burg Stahleck, Sankt Johann-Ohnastetten
67. Burg Steingebronn, Gomadingen-Steingebronn
68. Burg Steinhilben, Trochtelfingen-Steinhilben
69. Ruine Stöffeln (Stöffelberg, Alte Burg, Alt Stöffeln), Reutlingen-Gönningen
70. Burg Trochtelfingen, Trochtelfingen
71. Schloss Trochtelfingen (Gröll'sches Schloss), Trochtelfingen
72. Wasserschloss Trochtelfingen (Stolch'sches Schloss)), Trochtelfingen
73. Unteres Schloss Trochtelfingen, Trochtelfingen
74. Schloss Uhenfels, Bad Urach-Seeburg
75. Burg Unterhausen (Burgstein), Lichtenstein-Unterhausen
76. Burg Unterhausen (Greifenstein), Lichtenstein-Unterhausen
77. Schloss Urach, Bad Urach
78. Wehrkirche Walddorf, Walddorfhäslach-Walddorf
79. Burg Weiler, Hayingen-Münzdorf
80. Burg Wildenau, Pliezhausen

=== Landkreis Tübingen ===
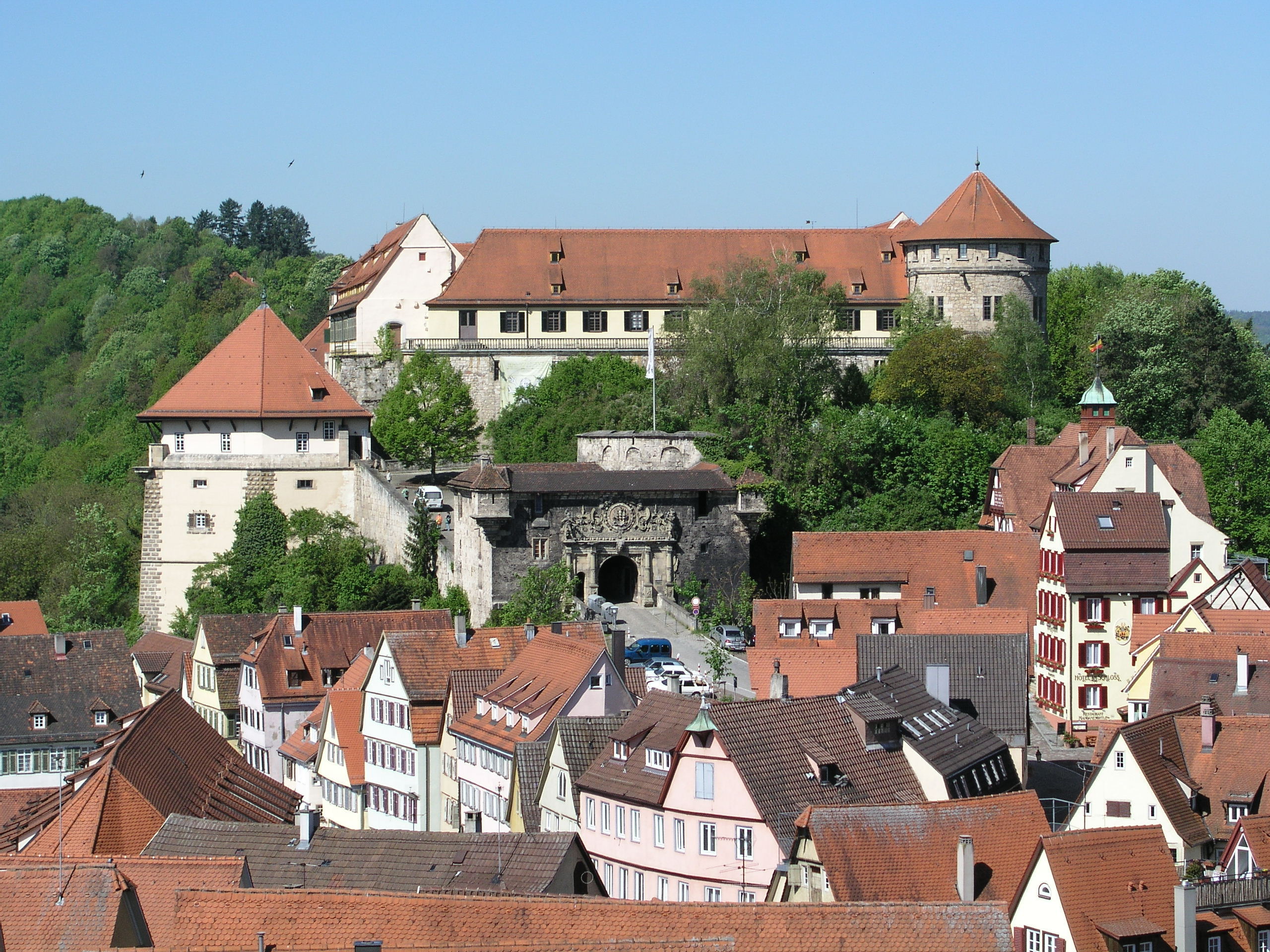
Schloss Hohentuebingen

1. Bebenhausen Abbey and Castle, Tübingen
2. Schloss Bühl, Tübingen, Bühl
3. Schloss Hirrlingen, Hirrlingen
4. Schloss Hohenentringen, Tübingen, Hagelloch (position near Ammerbuch, Entringen)
5. Schloss Hohentübingen, Tübingen
6. Schloss Kilchberg, Tübingen, Kilchberg
7. Burg Müneck, Ammerbuch
8. Schloss Poltringen, Ammerbuch, Poltringen
9. Schloss Roseck, Unterjesingen
10. Schloss Wachendorf, Starzach
11. Weilerburg, Weiler
12. Schloss Weitenburg, Starzach

=== Zollernalbkreis ===
1. Ruine Altentierberg, Lautlingen
2. Burg Aufhofen, Burladingen-Stetten-Aufhofen
3. Burg Azilun, Burladingen
4. Zollernschloss Balingen, Balingen
5. Schloss Binsdorf, Geislingen-Binsdorf
6. Schloss Bisingen, Bisingen
7. Jagdschloss Burladingen, Burladingen
8. Ruine Burladingen (Hochwacht), Burladingen
9. Burg Dotternhausen, Dotternhausen
10. Schloss Dotternhausen, Dotternhausen
11. Burg Ebingen (Nellenburg), Albstadt-Ebingen
12. Ruine Ehestetten (Taubenfels), Albstadt-Ebingen
13. Burg Endingen, Balingen-Endingen
14. Villa Eugenia, Hechingen
15. Ruine Falken (Gottfriedfelsen), Burladingen
16. Frundsburg (Frundsbürgle, Eineck), Burladingen-Ringingen
17. Geislingen Castle, Geislingen
18. Wasserburg Geislingen, Geislingen
19. Wasserschloss Geislingen (Unteres Schloss), Geislingen
20. Burg Gräbelesberg, Albstadt-Laufen an der Eyach
21. Schloss Grosselfingen, Grosselfingen
22. Schloss Gruol (Wasserschlössle), Haigerloch
23. Burg Haigerloch (Römerturm), Haigerloch
24. Schloss Haigerloch, Haigerloch
25. Haagschlößchen, Haigerloch
26. Schlößle Haigerloch (Untere Burg), Haigerloch
27. Ruine Haimburg (Homburg, Homberg, Hainburg), Grosselfingen
28. Burg Haiterbach (Schlossberg), Meßstetten
29. Burg Häringstein (Ebinger Schlossfels), Albstadt-Ebingen
30. Ruine Hasenfratz (Fratzenhas), Burladingen-Gauselfingen
31. Burg Hausen (Burg am Heubelstein), Albstadt-Margrethausen
32. Burg Hausen (Burzel), Hausen am Tann
33. Altes Schloss Hechingen, Hechingen
34. Neues Schloss Hechingen (Friedrichsburg), Hechingen
35. Burg Heersberg, Albstadt
36. Burg Heidenschlößle (Hausen, Weilen unter den Rinnen), Weilen unter den Rinnen
37. Burg Hinterwiesen, Balingen-Streichen
38. Burg Hirschberg, Balingen
39. Hochburg, Rangendingen
40. Ruine Hohenjungingen (Jungingen, Affenschmalz), Jungingen
41. Ruine Hohenmelchingen (Melchingen), Burladingen-Melchingen
42. Burg Hohenrangendingen, Rangendingen
43. Ruine Hohenringingen, Burladingen-Ringingen
44. Hohenzollern Castle, Bisingen
45. Ruine Holstein (Höllstein, Hölnstein), Burladingen-Stetten
46. Burg Hossingen (Hossenburg), Meßstetten-Hossingen
47. Burg Isnegg, Hechingen-Weilheim
48. Ruine Kapf, Burladingen
49. Ruine Leckstein (Lagstein), Burladingen-Gauselfingen
50. Schloss Lindich, Hechingen
51. Burg Melchingen, Burladingen-Melchingen
52. Burg Meßstetten, Meßstetten
53. Ruine Nähberg, Burladingen
54. Burg Oberdigisheim, Meßstetten-Oberdigisheim
55. Schloss Oberhausen (Winzeln), Hausen am Tann
56. Burg Oberhohenberg (Hohenberg), Schömberg-Schörzingen
57. Burg Obernheim (Burgbühl), Obernheim
58. Burg Plettenberg (Plaikten), Dotternhausen
59. Ruine Ringelstein (Ringingen, Aloisschlößle), Burladingen-Ringingen
60. Burg Rohr, Bisingen
61. Ruine Ror, Bisingen
62. Burg Rosenfeld, Rosenfeld
63. Burg Rosswangen, Balingen-Rosswangen
64. Ruine Salmendingen, Burladingen-Salmendingen
65. Schalksburg, Straßberg
66. Schalksburg, Albstadt-Laufen an der Eyach
67. Burg Semdach, Hechingen-Boll
68. Burg Stauffenberg, Hechingen
69. Schloss Stauffenberg (Stauffenberg, Staufenberg), Albstadt-Lautlingen
70. Ruine Stetten (Holstein, Hölnstein), Burladingen-Stetten unter Holstein
71. Burg Straßberg, Straßberg
72. Schloss Straßberg (Neues Schloss), Straßberg
73. Burg Streichen, Balingen-Streichen
74. Burg Tailfingen (Tailfinger Schloss), Albstadt-Tailfingen
75. Burg Tieringen, Meßstetten-Tieringen
76. Burg Vogelfels, Albstadt
77. Volksburg (Stein), Hechingen-Stein
78. Weilerburg (Weilersburg, Niederhohenberg, Rotenburg), Albstadt-Tailfingen
79. Wehrkirche Weilheim (Mariä Heimsuchung), Hechingen-Weilheim
80. Ruine Wenzelstein (Winzeln), Hausen am Tann
81. Burg Wildentierberg, Albstadt-Margrethausen
82. Burg Zell, Hechingen-Boll
83. Bürgle, Zimmern unter der Burg

=== Ulm ===
1. Schloss Böfingen
2. Schloss Obertalfingen

=== Alb-Donau-Kreis ===
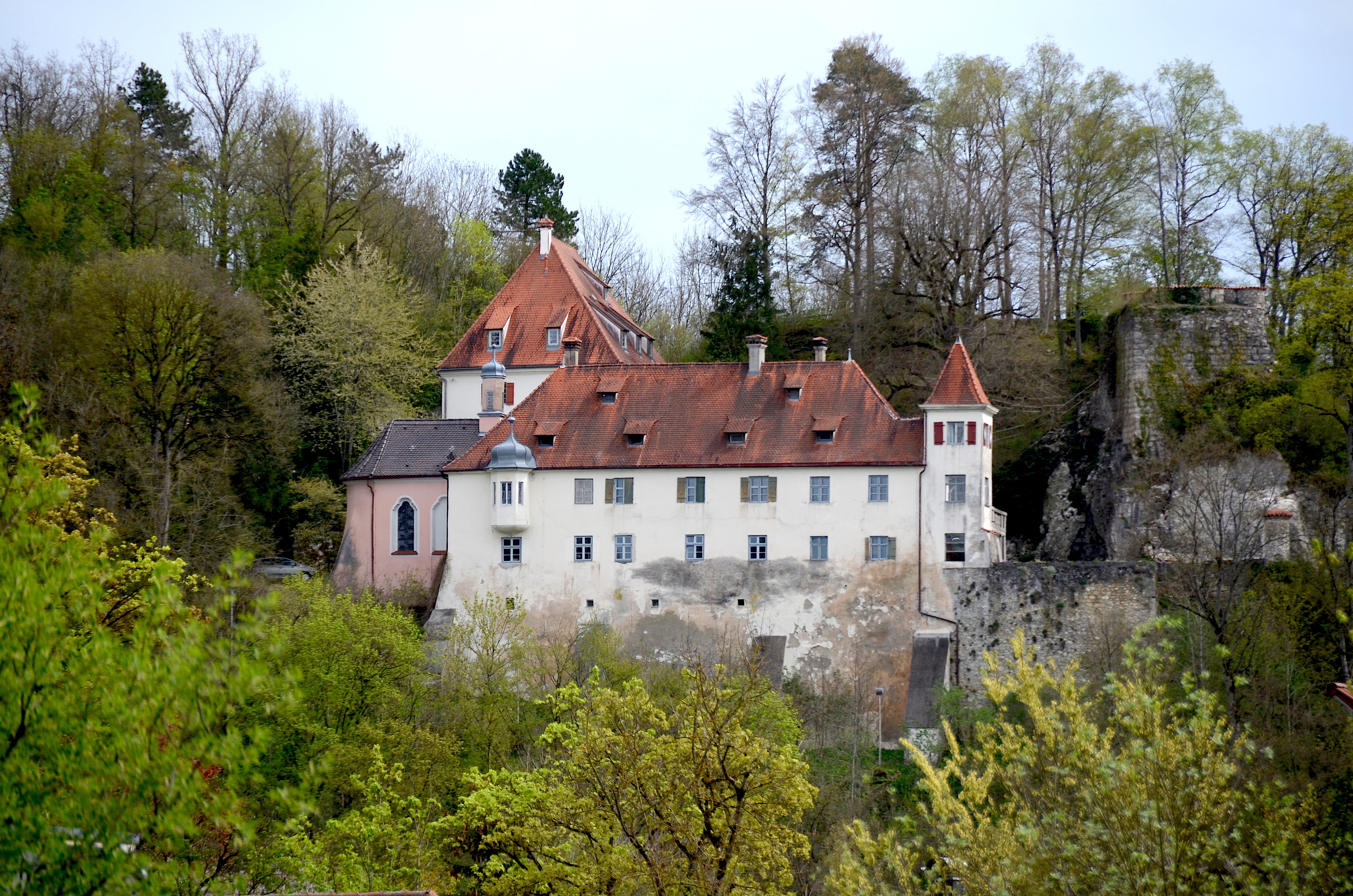
Klingenstein Castle, Blaustein

1. Albeck Castle, Langenau-Albeck
2. Allmendingen Castle, Allmendingen
3. Altenberg Castle, Dietenheim
4. Altheim Castle, Altheim near Ehingen
5. Altsteußlingen Castle, Ehingen
6. Arnegg Castle, Blaustein
7. Asselfingen Castle, Rammingen-Asselfingen
8. Bach Castle, Erbach-Bach
9. Berg Castle, Ehingen
10. Berkach Castle, Ehingen
11. Bernstadt Castle, Bernstadt
12. Blauenstein Castle, Blaubeuren
13. Blaustein Castle, Blaubeuren
14. Bollingen Castle, Dornstadt-Bollingen
15. Brandenburg Castle, Dietenheim
16. Breitenbühl, Bernstadt
17. Schlössle Breitingen, Breitingen
18. Briel Castle, Ehingen (Donau)
19. Dellmensingen Castle, Erbach an der Donau
20. Schloss Emerkingen, Emerkingen
21. Erbach Castle, Erbach
22. Schloss Gamerschwang, Ehingen (Donau)
23. Gleißenburg Castle, Blaubeuren
24. Schloss Granheim, Ehingen (Donau)
25. Günzelburg Castle, Blaubeuren
26. Hohenschelklingen Castle, Schelklingen
27. Jörgenberg Castle, Rechtenstein
28. Justingen Castle, Ehingen (Donau)
29. Klingenstein Castle, Blaustein
30. Schloss Mochental, Ehingen (Donau)
31. Monsberg Castle, Ehingen (Donau)
32. Muschenwang Castle, Schelklingen
33. Neidegg Castle, Blaustein
34. Schloss Neusteußlingen, Ehingen (Donau)
35. Oberes Schloss Oberbalzheim, Balzheim
36. Unteres Schloss Oberbalzheim, Balzheim
37. Schloss Oberdischingen, Oberdischingen
38. Schloss Oberherrlingen, Blaustein
39. Schloss Oberkirchberg, Illerkirchberg
40. Rechtenstein Castle, Rechtenstein
41. Reichenstein Castle, Lauterach
42. Schloss Rißtissen, Ehingen (Donau)
43. St. Ruprecht Castle, Ehingen (Donau)
44. Rusenschloss Castle, Blaubeuren
45. Sirgenstein Castle, Blaubeuren
46. Wartstein, Ehingen (Donau)

=== Landkreis Biberach ===
1. Achstetten Castle, Achstetten
2. Alberweiler Castle, Schemmerhofen
3. Bachritterburg Kanzach, Kanzach
4. Bussen, Uttenweiler
5. Großlaupheim Castle, Laupheim
6. Hassenberg Castle, Riedlingen
7. Kleinlaupheim Castle, Laupheim
8. Obersulmetingen Castle, Laupheim - Obersulmetingen
9. Orsenhausen Castle, Schwendi-Orsenhausen
10. Ummendorf Castle, Ummendorf
11. Untersulmetingen Castle, Laupheim - Untersulmetingen
12. Wain Castle, Wain
13. Warthausen Castle, Warthausen
14. Winterstetten Castle, Winterstettenstadt
15. Zwiefaltendorf Castle, Riedlingen

=== Bodenseekreis ===
1. Schloss Friedrichshafen, Friedrichshafen
2. Schloss Heiligenberg, Heiligenberg
3. Schloss Maurach, Uhldingen-Mühlhofen
4. Burg Meersburg, Meersburg
5. Neues Schloss Meersburg, Meersburg
6. Schloss Salem, Salem
7. Tettnang New Castle, Tettnang

=== Landkreis Ravensburg ===
1. Schloss Achberg, Achberg
2. Schloss Altshausen, Altshausen
3. Schloss Aulendorf, Aulendorf
4. Schloss Benzenhofen, Berg
5. Burg Hatzenturm, Wolpertswende
6. Altes Schloss Kißlegg, Kißlegg
7. Neues Schloss Kißlegg, Kißlegg
8. Burg Königsegg, Guggenhausen
9. Schloss Königseggwald, Königseggwald
10. Burg Neuravensburg, Wangen im Allgäu
11. Burgruine Marstetten, Aitrach
12. Veitsburg, Ravensburg
13. Waldburg, Waldburg
14. Schloss Waldsee, Bad Waldsee
15. Schloss Wolfegg, Wolfegg
16. Schloss Wurzach, Bad Wurzach

=== Landkreis Sigmaringen ===
1. Affelstetten Castle, Veringenstadt-Veringendorf
2. Altes Schloss (Gammertingen), Gammertingen
3. Altgutenstein (Burgfelden), Sigmaringen-Gutenstein
4. Altwildenstein (Vorderwildenstein), Leibertingen
5. Auchtbühl Castle, Beuron-Neidlingen
6. Ruine Baldenstein, Gammertingen
7. Schloss Bartelstein, Scheer
8. Baumburg (Hundersingen) (Buwenburg), Herbertingen-Hundersingen
9. Ruine Benzenberg (Benzenburg), Meßkirch-Rohrdorf
10. Burgstall Bittelschieß, Krauchenwies-Bittelschieß
11. Ruine Bittelschieß, Bingen-Hornstein
12. Boll Castle, Sauldorf-Boll
13. Schloss Bronnen, Gammertingen-Bronnen
14. Bürgle (Heudorf), Scheer-Heudorf
15. Ruine Burgweiler, Ostrach-Burgweiler
16. Burrach Castle, Wald (Hohenzollern)
17. Ruine Dietfurt, Inzigkofen-Dietfurt
18. Ruine Eppenburg, Stetten am kalten Markt-Frohnstetten
19. Burg Falkenstein (Donautal), Beuron
20. Fallfelsenhöhle, Beuron
21. Friedberg Castle (Bad Saulgau), Bad Saulgau-Friedberg
22. Gebrochen Gutenstein (Neugutenstein, Niedergutenstein), Sigmaringen-Gutenstein
23. Schloss Gutenstein, Sigmaringen-Gutenstein
24. Hahnenkamm, Leibertingen
25. Schloss Hausen, Beuron-Hausen im Tal
26. Heggelbach Castle, Herdwangen-Schönach-Oberndorf
27. Ruine Hertenstein, Sigmaringen
28. Schloss Hettingen, Hettingen
29. Hexenturm, Leibertingen
30. Hinterlichtenstein Castle, Neufra
31. Hornstein Castle, Bingen
32. Hustneck Castle, Gammertingen
33. Schloss Inzigkofen, Inzigkofen
34. Burg Isikofen, Sigmaringen-Jungnau
35. Josefslust Hunting Lodge, Sigmaringen-Josefslust
36. Jungnau Castle, Sigmaringen-Jungnau
37. Schloss Krauchenwies (Landhaus), Krauchenwies
38. Krauchenwies (Altes Schloss, Wasserhaus), Krauchenwies
39. Kreidenstein Castle, Beuron
40. Lägelen (Wagenburg), Beuron-Hausen im Tal
41. Langenfels Castle, Beuron
42. Leibertingen (Bei der Burg), Leibertingen
43. Lengenfeld Castle, Beuron-Hausen im Tal
44. Lenzenberg (Lenzenburg, Langenfels), Beuron-Hausen im Tal
45. Wasserschloss Menningen, Meßkirch-Menningen
46. Meßkirch Castle, Meßkirch
47. Neidinger Heidenschloss (Jagberg, Heidenschloss), Beuron-Neidingen
48. Neues Schloss (Gammertingen), Gammertingen
49. Burgruine Neugutenstein, Sigmaringen
50. Oberfalkenstein Castle, Beuron
51. Petershöhle, Beuron
52. Pfannenstiel Castle, Beuron
53. Ramsberg Castle, Großschönach
54. Schauenburg, Stetten am kalten Markt
55. Schloss Scheer, Scheer
56. Schiltau Castle, Sigmaringen-Jungnau
57. Schmeien Castle, Sigmaringen-Oberschmeien
58. Sigmaringen Castle, Sigmaringen
59. Sigmaringendorf Castle, Sigmaringendorf
60. Schloss Sigmaringendorf (Ratzenhofer Schlösschen), Sigmaringendorf
61. Spaltfels, Beuron
62. Schloss Stetten, Stetten am kalten Markt
63. Storzinger Schlössle, Stetten am kalten Markt-Storzingen
64. Unterfalkenstein, Beuron-Thiergarten
65. Unterwildenstein, Leibertingen
66. Utkoven (Nickhof), Inzigkofen
67. Veringen Castle, Veringenstadt-Veringendorf
68. Vorderlichtenstein Castle (Bubenhofen), Neufra
69. Waldsberg (Krumbach), Sauldorf-Krumbach
70. Weckenstein (Heidenschloss), Stetten am kalten Markt-Storzingen
71. Weiler (Heidenloch), Beuron-Thiergarten
72. Schloss Werenwag, Beuron
73. Wildenstein Castle, Leibertingen

== See also ==
- List of castles
- List of castles in Germany
