= Erbach Castle =

Castle in Germany

Coordinates: 48.3232°N 9.88562°E

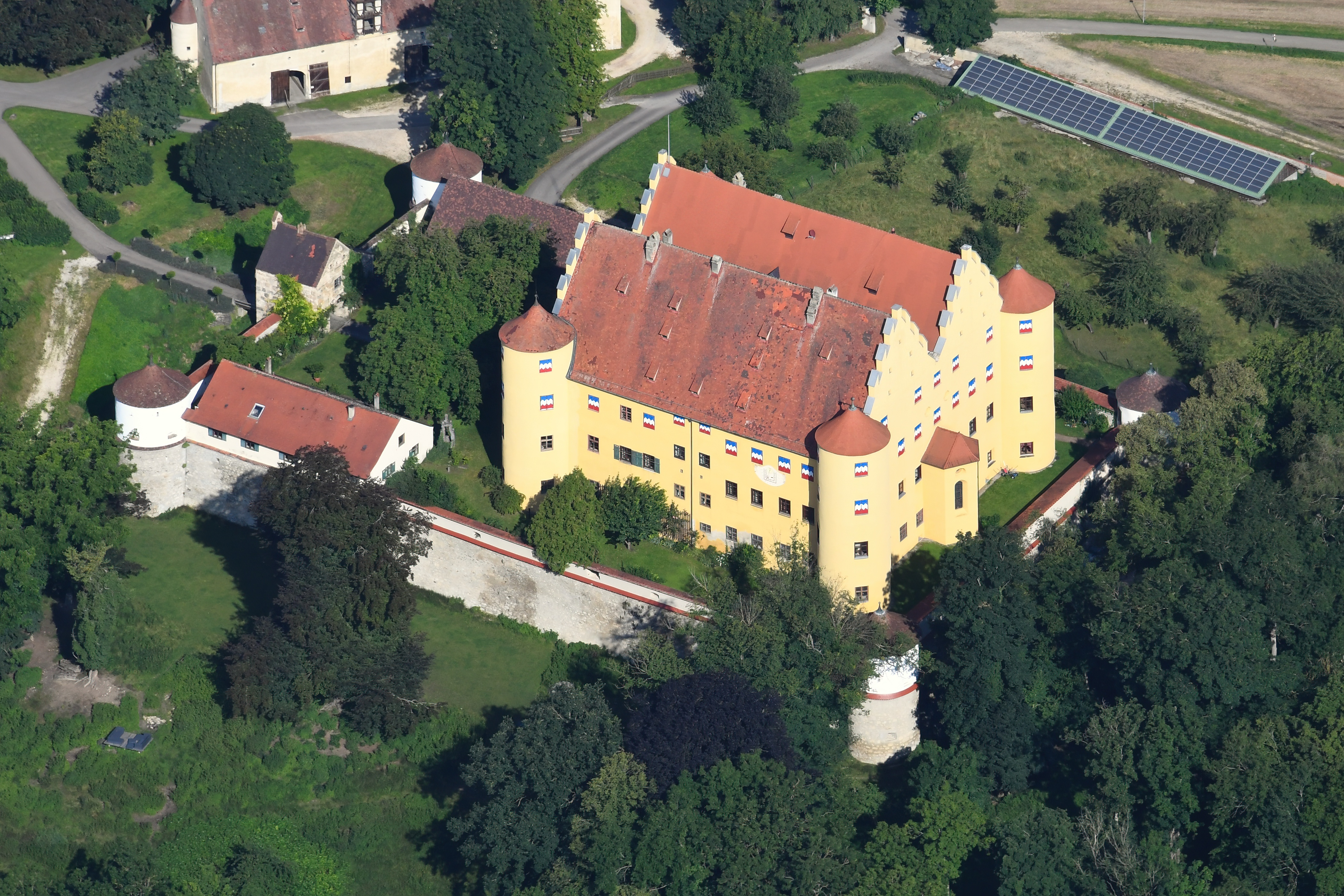
Aerial view of the Erbach Castle

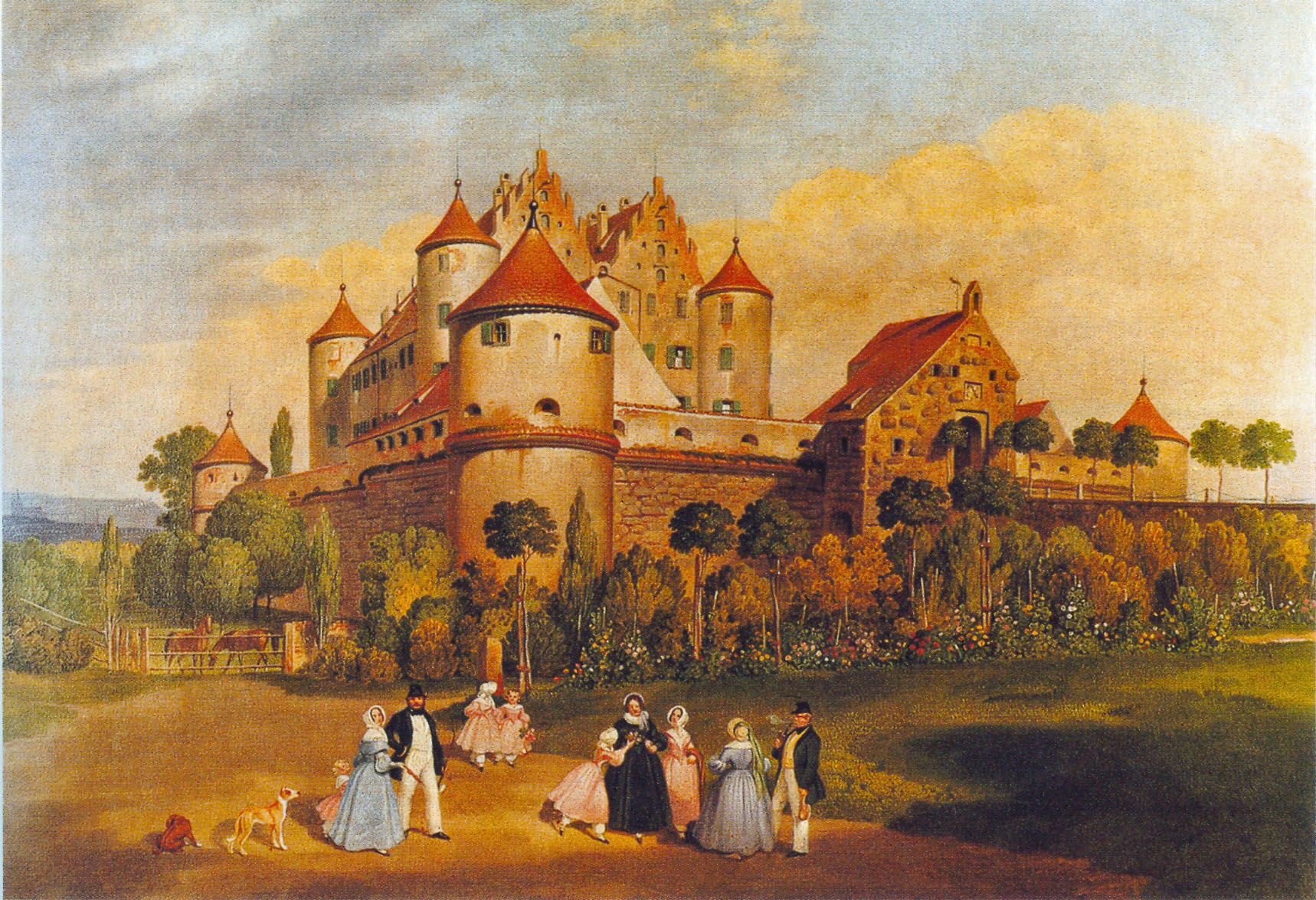
Erbach Castle, painting from 1844

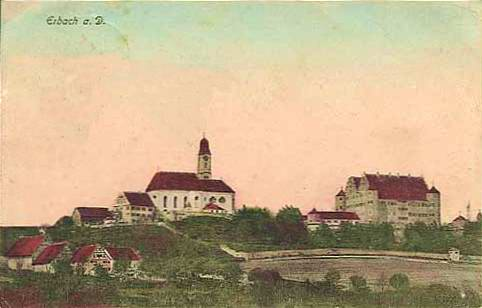
Erbach Castle ca. 1920

Erbach Castle is a patrician Renaissance castle situated on a hillside close to the city of Erbach an der Donau in the state of Baden Württemberg, Germany. It remains under private ownership.

== History ==
The origins of the castle date back to the 12th century. The task of the castle was to secure and safeguard the important crossing over the river Danube. The keep was built during the reign of the House of Hohenstaufen and explicitly mentioned in a document from 1384. The Gothic spire was added at the end of the 15th century. The original modest Romanesque castle was extended in the 16th century into a renaissance palace. In 1525 during the German Peasants' War the castle was damaged by revolting farmers of the Baltringer Haufen.

Hans von Paumgarten, a patrician from Augsburg, was enfeoffed with Erbach Castle in 1534. His heir, Hans Georg von Paumgarten, started works to rebuild the castle on a large scale in 1550: two wings alongside each other on top of large vaulted basement rooms, three storeys high with four more levels under the roofs. The works were completed in 1555, ruining Hans Georg von Paumgarten.

In 1612 Hans Ludwig of Ulm became lord of Erbach. During the Thirty Years' War Bernard of Saxe-Weimar, one of the foremost Protestant generals, resided at Erbach Castle in 1633. Following a prolonged period of occupation by Swedish troops, the castle was left in an uninhabitable state. After the Thirty Years' War a pleasure garden, non-existent today, was added to the castle. The last substantial alterations to the castle were carried out in the first half of the 18th century. In 1902 the castle was decorated in neo-baroque style.

== Buildings ==
Erbach Castle was inspired by the architectural style employed by patricians of the larger cities, evidence for which are crow-stepped gables and the gabled roofs. Entrance to the castle is via a drawbridge, followed by a gate. The castle courtyard is surrounded by mews and outbuildings. In the courtyard there is a hand-drawn water well. The Baroque castle chapel is situated at the end of the main hall.

The so-called Renaissance Room was altered in 1884 for the last time; other rooms worth mentioning are the Small Smoking room, the Maria-Theresia-Drawing room, the Brown Drawing room, the Red Drawing room and the Clerical Drawing room.

== Current use ==
Erbach Castle is still in private hands, owned by the descendants of the barons of Ulm-Erbach who also run the castle museum. Parts of the castle are used as a restaurant while the basement houses a theatre.

== See also ==
- List of castles in Baden-Württemberg
