= Amlishagen Castle =

Coordinates: 49°15′45″N 9°57′43″E

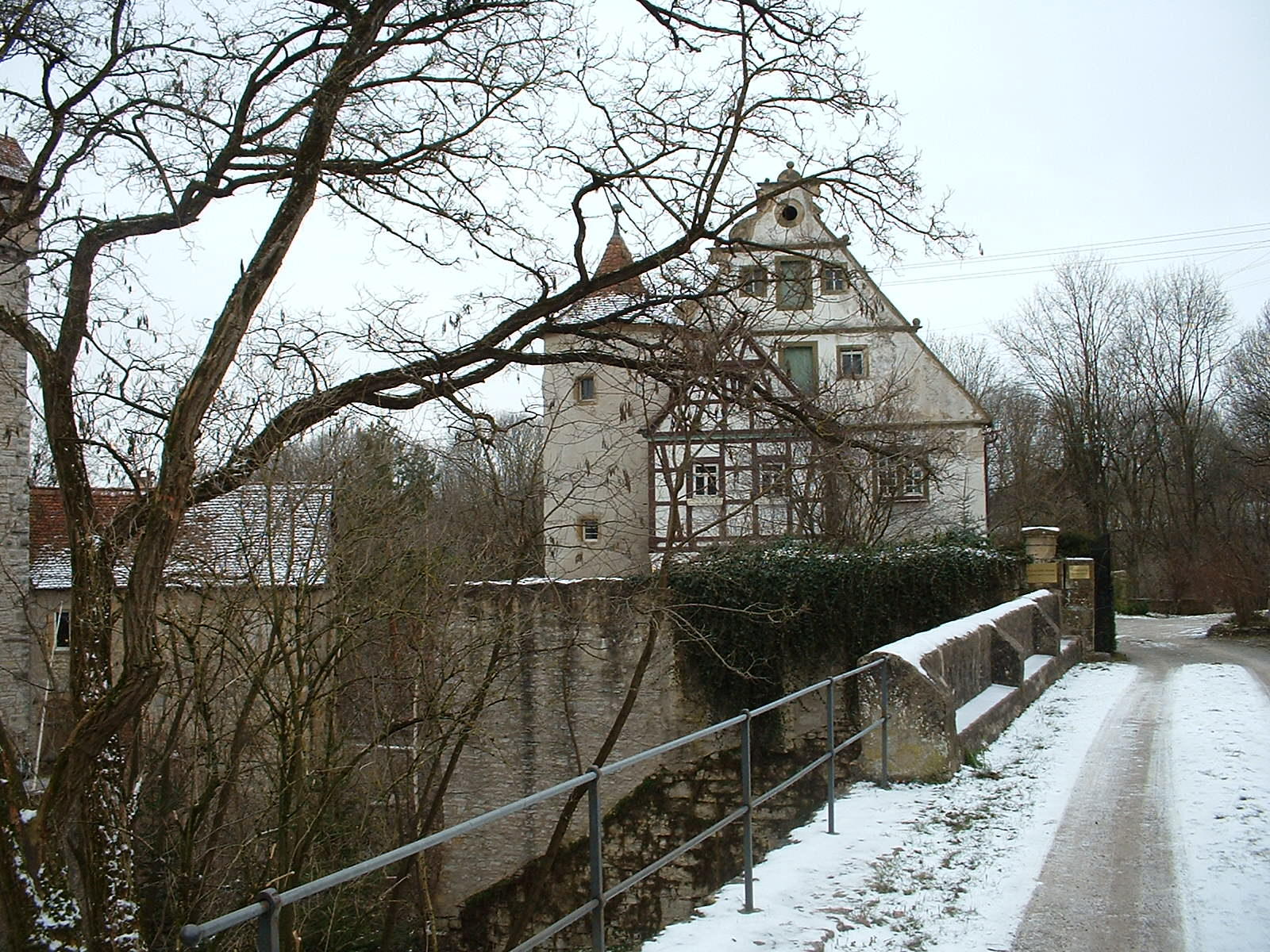
Central keep at Amlishagen Castle

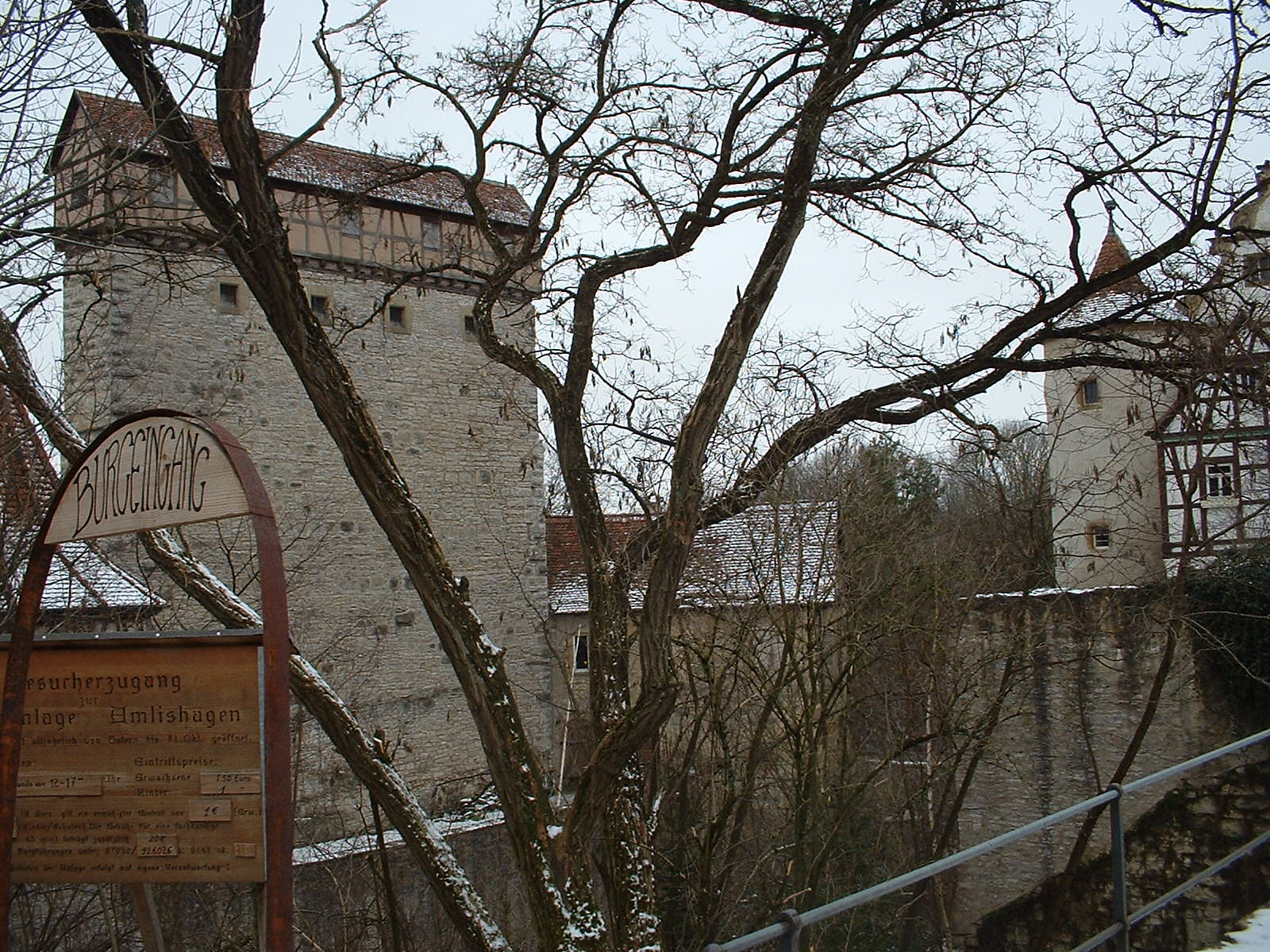
Wall of Amlishagen Castle

Amlishagen Castle is a castle near the village of Amlishagen, which is a section of the town of Gerabronn, in the Schwäbisch Hall District of Baden-Württemberg, Germany.

== History ==
The castle was built in the 13th century and first mentioned in 1253. In the second half of the 14th century, 1601 and in the 19th century the castle was expanded and renovated. The castle was owned by the Lords of Amlingshagen and later by the Lords of Wollmershausen. The castle is currently privately owned and occupied. It can be visited from Easter until 31 October on weekends only.

After the family von Wollmershausen died out in the 18th century, the castle was owned by a number of individuals. The castle was finally bought by Gebhard Leberecht von Blücher the Prussian Generalfeldmarschall who led his army against Napoleon I at the Battle of the Nations at Leipzig in 1813 and at the Battle of Waterloo in 1815 with the Duke of Wellington. A distant descendant owns the castle today.

== See also ==
- List of castles in Baden-Württemberg
- Gerabronn
