= Steinsberg Castle =

Coordinates: 49.214°N 8.877°E

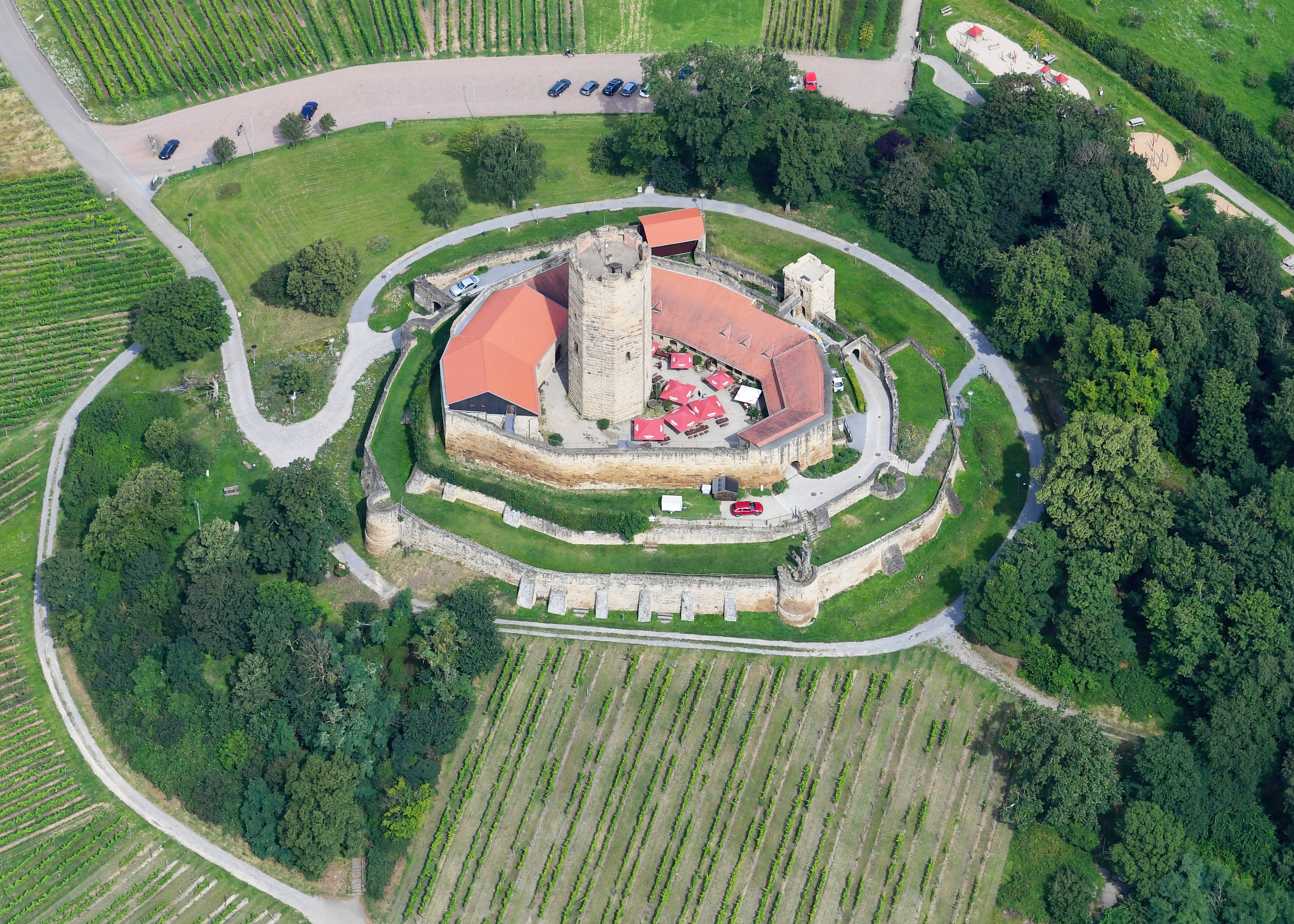
Aerial view of Steinsberg Castle

Steinsberg Castle is a castle in the village of Weiler, a suburb of Sinsheim in the German state of Baden-Württemberg.

== History ==
The castle was first mentioned in the year 1109. In the thirteenth century the owners of the castle were the Counts of Oettingen. Later the castle became home to the Counts palatine of the Rhein. In 1517 the castle was purchased by the Lords of Venningen. Shortly after this purchase the castle was burnt down during the Peasants' revolt. The rebellious peasants had to pay 5000 Gulden for the rebuilding of the castle. After heavy damage in 1777 by a strike of lightning the castle was left in disrepair. Since 1973 the castle has been owned by the Sinsheim council, who had large parts of the castle restored. The keep, the moat and the towers may still be viewed today.

== See also ==
- List of castles in Baden-Württemberg
