= Tettnang Castle =

Coordinates: 47°40′15″N 9°35′15″E

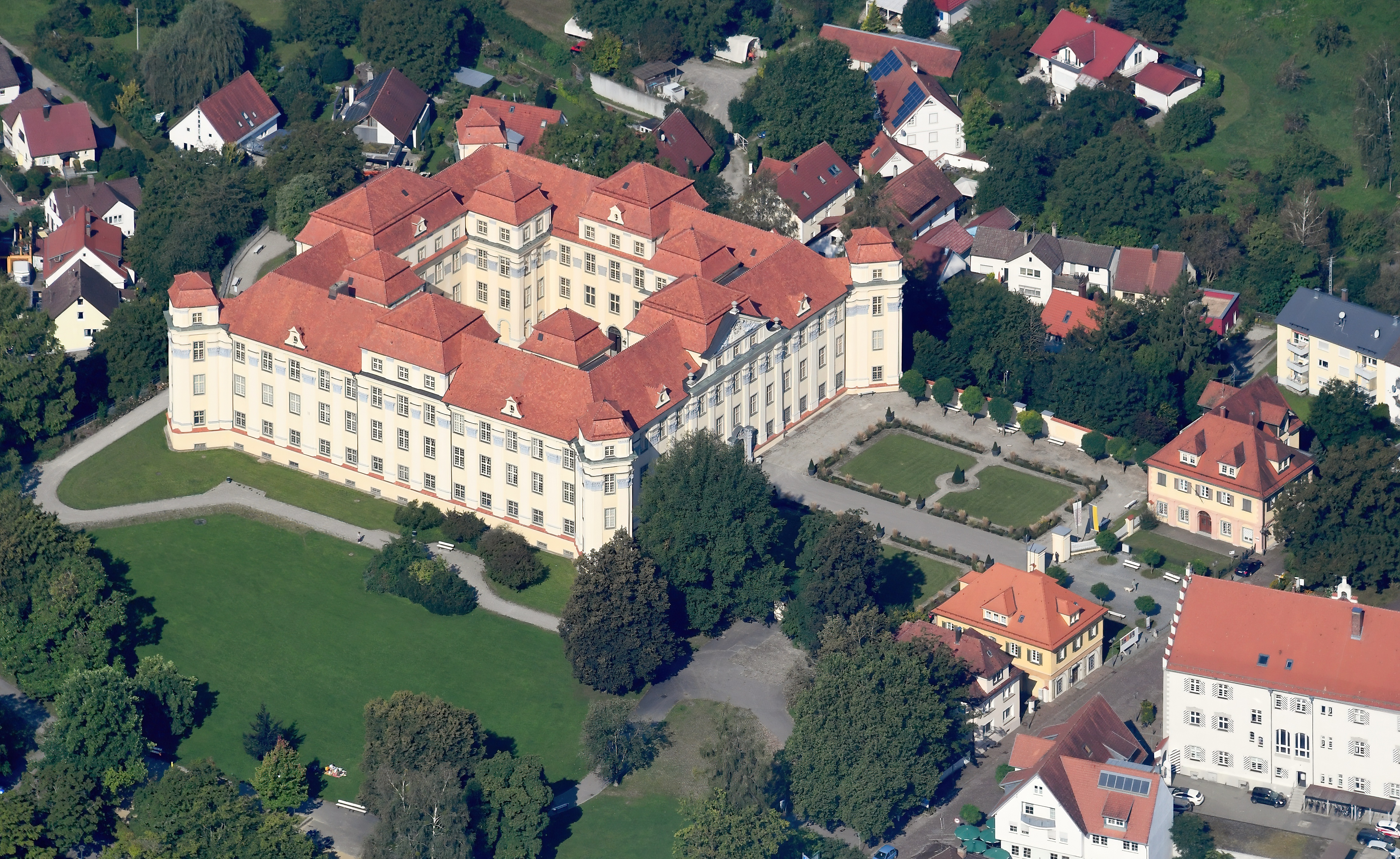
Aerial view of the castle

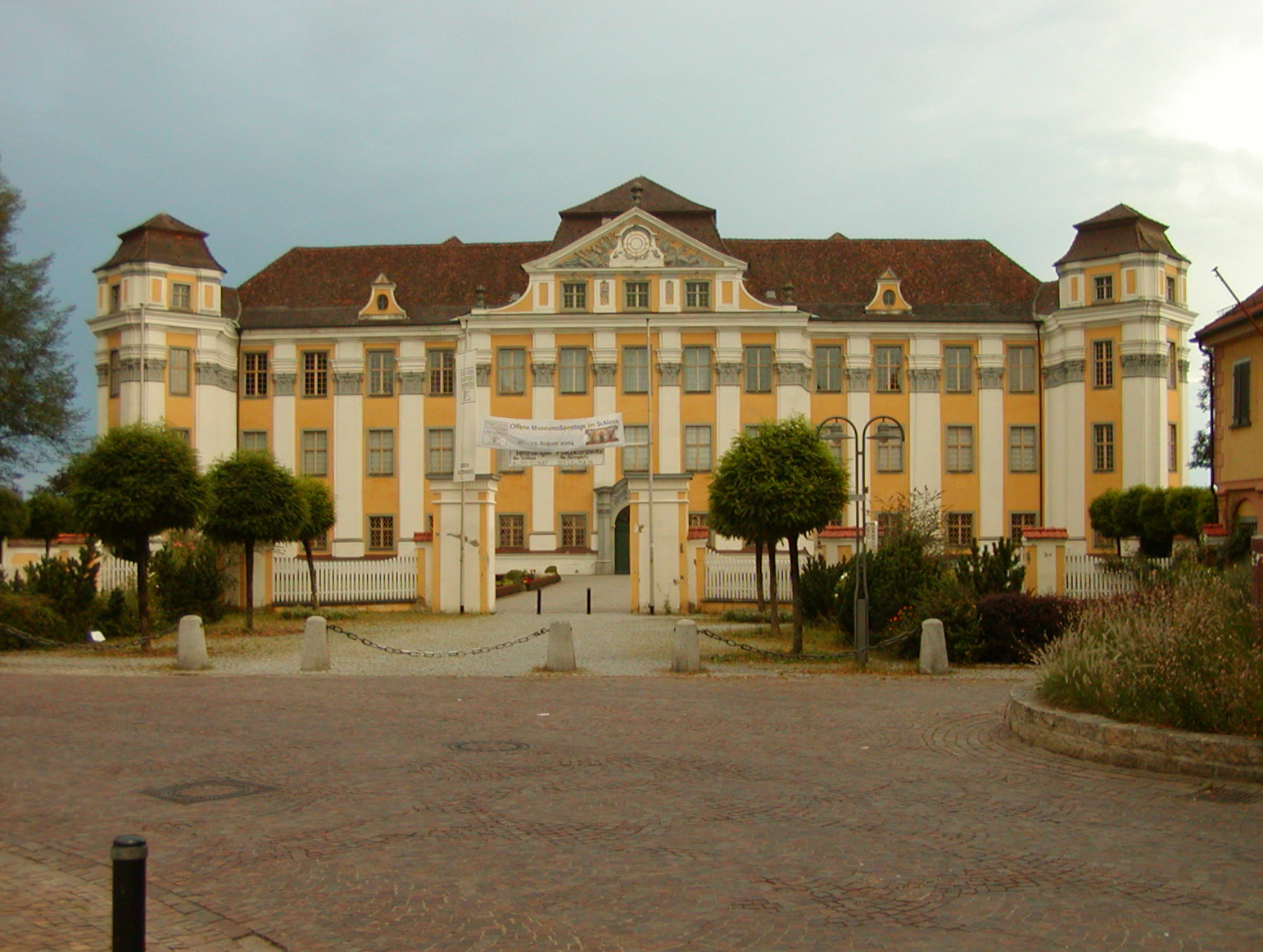
View of the front side in 2004

Tettnang Castle, also known as the Tettnang New Palace (German: Neues Schloss Tettnang), is one of three castles in the German town of Tettnang. The other ones are Tettnang Old Palace (opposite to the New Palace) and Torschloss close to Bärenplatz.

Tettnang Castle is owned by Staatliche Schlösser und Gärten Baden-Württemberg.

== History ==
Originally, a fort stood on the site of the current castle. From 1260 until 1780, the site was the residence of the Counts of Montfort. The old fort was destroyed in 1633, during the Thirty Years' War. Count Anton III of Montfort subsequently started rebuilding the castle in 1712, hiring the architect Christoph Gessinger, a Benedictine friar from Isny, to draft designs for a new castle. His aim was to tear down the remains of the mediaeval fort to make way for a completely new palace. In 1728, construction work came to a grinding halt when the funds of the Count ran dry. Count Anton III died in 1733, and the castle remained unfinished.

A major section of the façade, along with parts of the interior decoration, were damaged by fire in 1753. Under the patronage of Count Franz Xaver, restoration work was subsequently completed in 1770. The fine sculptures and paintwork inside the castle were carried out by Joseph Anton Feuchtmayer, Käte Schaller-Härlin and Andreas Brugger. Jakob Emele was responsible for the rococo work.

When the county of Tettnang was sold to Austria around 1780 (to pay off debts), most of the interior fittings were sold and the castle passed into public ownership. When Tettnang was handed over to Bavaria as part of the Peace of Pressburg, the castle returned to German ownership.

Additional restoration of the castle was carried out between 1960 and 1982. In 1997, the castle was opened to the public for tours. Since 2015 the Museum is open 6 days a week, except Wednesday, each from Easter until October 31. The Museum can be visited during guided tours only, which are starting hourly. Taking photos during the tours is prohibited.

In 2014 the first Schlossgarten Open-Air was held in the garden next to the Castle, the next concerts are in June 2017.

== See also ==
- List of castles
- List of castles in Baden-Württemberg
