= Hohennagold Castle =

Ruined castle in Germany

Coordinates: 48.5533°N 8.71667°E

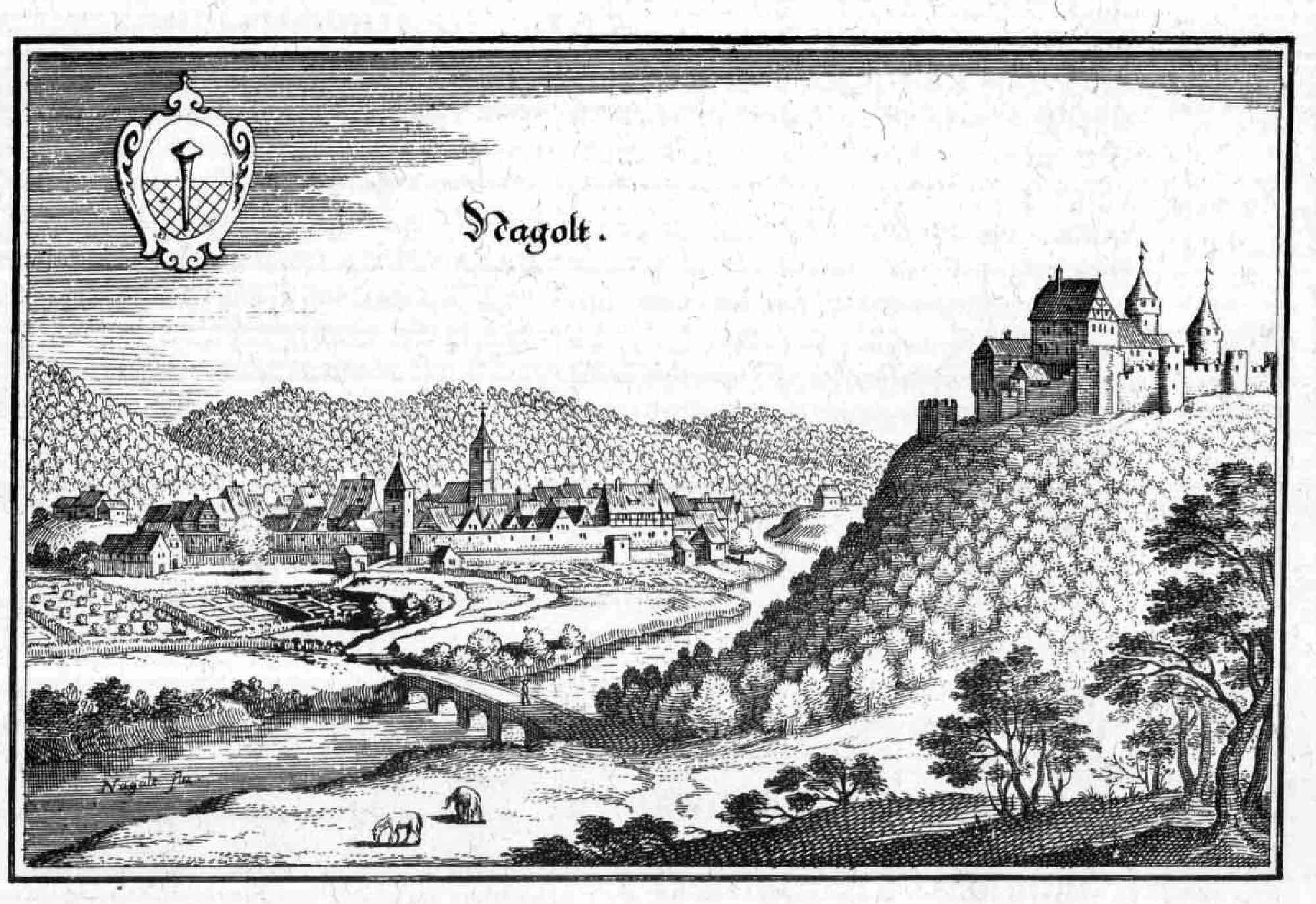
Hohennagold Castle in the first half of the 17th century

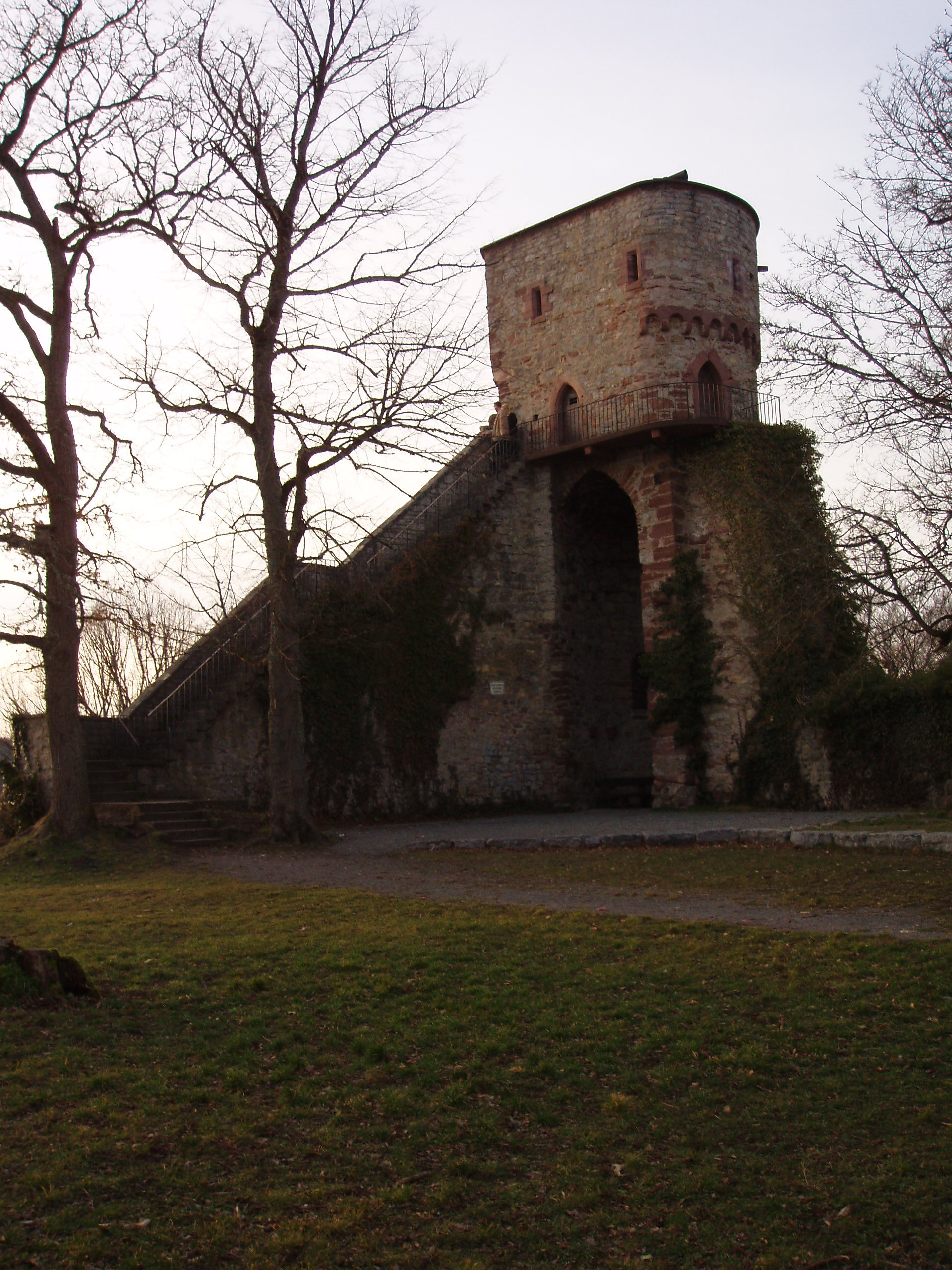
Hohennagold Castle

Hohennagold Castle is a ruined castle situated on a hill, the so-called Schlossberg (castle mountain), overlooking the Black Forest town of Nagold. The hill consists predominantly of porphyritic rock. The ruins represent a relatively well-preserved 12th-century castle. The keep behind the curtain walls, a tower in the north-western corner of the complex as well as the outer ward with half-round and angular towers, are still visible. Around the castle there appears to have been a moat.

== History ==
An early medieval fortification was possibly erected at the location of the future castle around 750 by Count Ruodbrecht, one of Charlemagne's uncles.

The original castle was built around 1100 by the Counts of Nagold, who became the Counts palatine of Tübingen in 1145. The castle complex was extensively expanded between 1153 and 1162.

In the middle of the 13th century the castle passed into the possession of the Counts of Hohenberg. Thereafter, one branch of this family called itself Counts of Nagold and had the castle transformed into their residence in the 13th and 14th century. In 1364 the sold the castle to the Counts of Württemberg. The new owners added bastions and towers to the outer ward and had the castle occupied by their ministeriales. Towards the end of the Thirty Years' War, the castle was conquered by Bavarian troops in 1645 and severely damaged. In 1646 the remnants of the castle were pulled down.

In 1945 the northwest tower was destroyed by a low-level attack carried out by Allied planes. The castle remains were tentatively restored after World War II, trying to preserve the castle as a ruin.

== See also ==
- List of castles in Baden-Württemberg
