= Ballmertshofen Castle =

16th-century castle in Baden-Württemberg, Germany

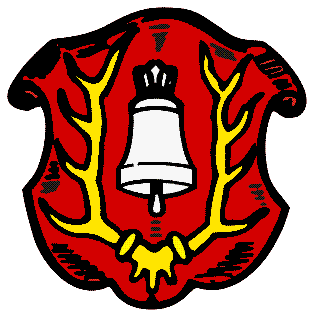
Ballmertshofen Castle
- Germany
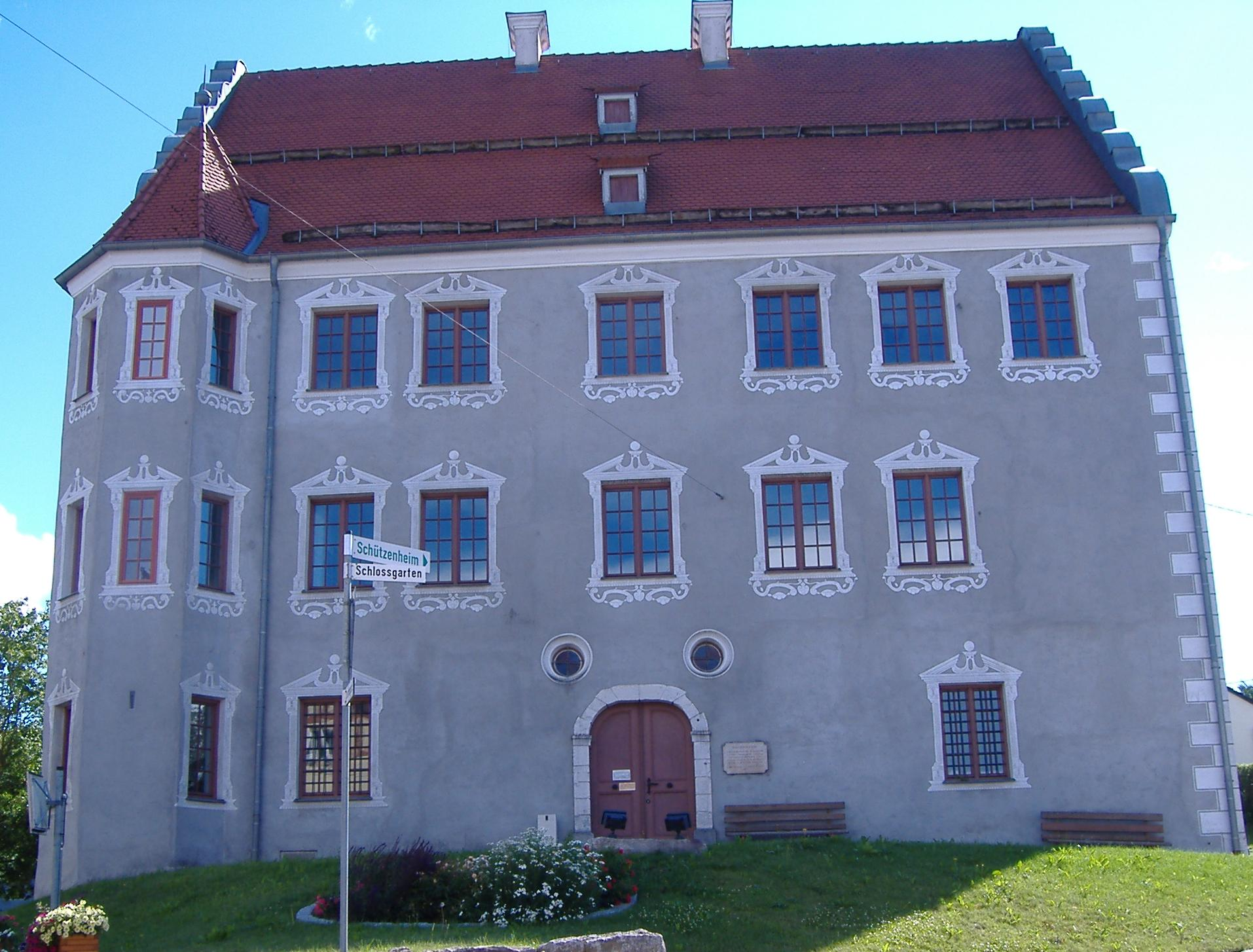

Location
- Location within Baden-Württemberg Location within Germany
- Coordinates: 48°40′14″N 10°22′23″E

Ballmertshofen Castle is a 16th-century castle located in the Ballmertshofen section of Dischingen in the Heidenheim district of Baden-Württemberg in Germany. It is located in the south east corner of Ballmertshofen on the road to Giengen and Dattenhausen. The castle is owned by the community and includes a local art gallery.

== See also ==
- List of castles in Baden-Württemberg
