= Eselsburg Castle =

Derelict historical building in Baden-Württemberg (Germany)

Coordinates: 48°36′2″N 10°10′58″E

- Burgstall Eselsburg
- Near Herbrechtingen in Germany
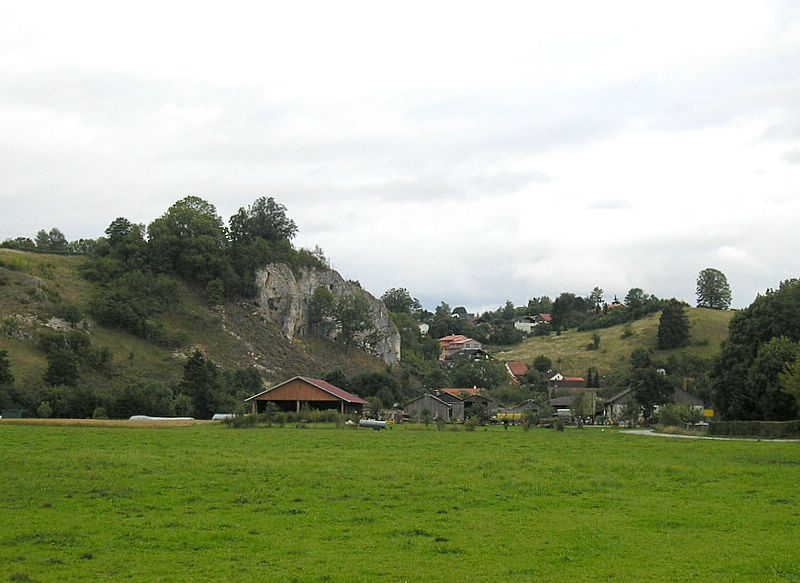
- Eselsburg Castle rock above the Eselsburger Valley

Site information
- Type: Levelled castle

Site history
- Built: 1200

Eselsburg Castle (German: Burgstall Eselsburg) is a levelled castle located above the town of Herbrechtingen in the Heidenheim district of Baden-Württemberg in Germany.

== Location ==
The castle is located about 50 m above the valley floor, above the Eselsburg section of Herbrechtingen. The central keep is located on the edge of a steep rock cliff (521 m above sea level) that projects up from the valley floor. A semi-circular trench protects the castle on the other side.

== History ==
The Eselsburg was built around 1200 as the home of the ministeriales or unfree knights of the Graf or Baron von Dillingen. It is likely that an earlier castle foundation was reused to build the castle. In 1244 a knight named Gerwig (Gerwicus) von Eselsburg is mentioned in a document. In 1270, Rudolf von Eselsburg served the Graf Ulrich II. von Helfenstein. In 1284 another Gerwig von Eselsburg entered the service of the Bishop of Augsburg. Then, in 1343 the Eselsburger sold their castle and property in Herbrechtingen.

The castle then passed through several owners in the next century. In 1385 Wilhelm von Riedheim acquired the land. In 1414 Heinrich von Bopfingen acquired the property, which became an Imperial fief in 1441. Then, in 1444 Rudolf von Bopfingen sold his half of the rights to the castle to Heinrich Krafft from Ulm. Heinrich then acquired the other half of the rights one year later from Sigmund von Eselsburg. In 1453 the Emperor released the castle from his ownership, and it ceased to be an imperial fief.

In 1462 the castle was burned by Bavarian troops, during a Reichskrieg against the Duchy of Bavaria. In 1479 the castle became the property of Eitelhans von Knöringen. Then, in 1503 the Lords von Eben took over castle Eselsburg. Christoph Friedrich von Eben sold the castle in 1562 to his brother in law Ulrich von Rechberg zu Falkenstein. Following a divestment of the property to the House of Württemberg in 1593 the castle was emptied and began to decay. By 1690 the castle is reported to be "abandoned and totally overgrown".

== Castle Grounds ==
Of the High Middle Ages castle, only the ditch and a few fragments of the wall are visible today.

The ditch was cut from rock and about 5 m deep and 4 to 5 m wide. Additionally, behind the ditch, a three sided wall protected the keep. The angular trench is generally easy to follow, though the southern section is mostly filled in.

The remains of the rectangular keep (ca. 23 x 30 m) are built from a variety of rough finished stones and buckel stones (square stones with a rounded outer edge). On this site, according to the 1581 Renlinschen Forstkarte (Renlinschen Forest Map located in the Germanisches Nationalmuseum Nürnberg), there were two fortified houses with saddle roofs and a tower which was topped with a helmet. Between the two wings in east and west was the small courtyard. A fragment of the wall in front of the east building could belong to an inner wall.

== See also ==
- List of castles in Baden-Württemberg
