= Burgruine Diepoldsburg =

Ruined castle in Germany

Coordinates: 48°34′21″N 9°29′19″E

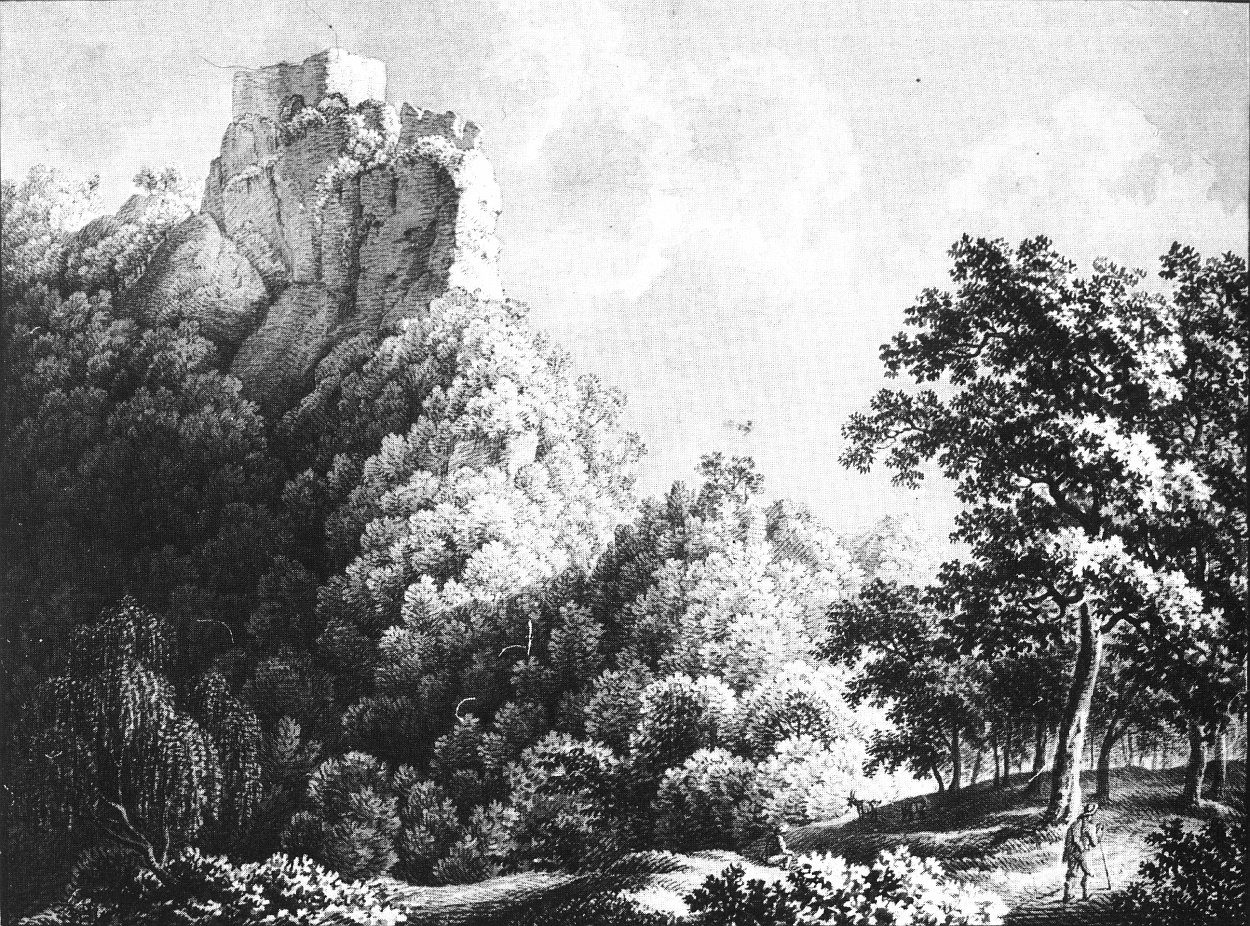
Brush drawing of the castle ruins by August Seyffer from the year 1813/14

Ruine Diepoldsburg is a ruined castle near the community of Lenningen, Baden-Württemberg, Germany.
