= Buchheim =

- Municipality
- Flag Coat of arms

- Location of Buchheim within Tuttlingen district
- Interactive map of Buchheim
- Location within Germany Location within Baden-Württemberg
- Coordinates: 48°00′37″N 08°59′12″E
- Country: Germany
- State: Baden-Württemberg
- Admin. region: Freiburg
- District: Tuttlingen

Government
  - Mayor (2017–25): Claudette Kölzow

Area
  - Total: 18.31 km^{2} (7.07 sq mi)
- Elevation: 793 m (2,602 ft)

Population (2025-12-31)
  - Total: 754
  - Density: 41.2/km^{2} (107/sq mi)
- Time zone: UTC+01:00 (CET)
  - Summer (DST): UTC+02:00 (CEST)
- Postal codes: 88637
- Dialling codes: 07777
- Vehicle registration: TUT
- Website: www.donau-heuberg.de

Buchheim (German pronunciation: [ˈbuːxˌhaɪ̯m]) is a municipality in the district of Tuttlingen in Baden-Württemberg in Germany.
