= Castle Berg (Stuttgart) =

Ruined water castle in Germany

- Wasserburg Berg
- Berg, Stuttgart-East; Near Stuttgart, in Germany
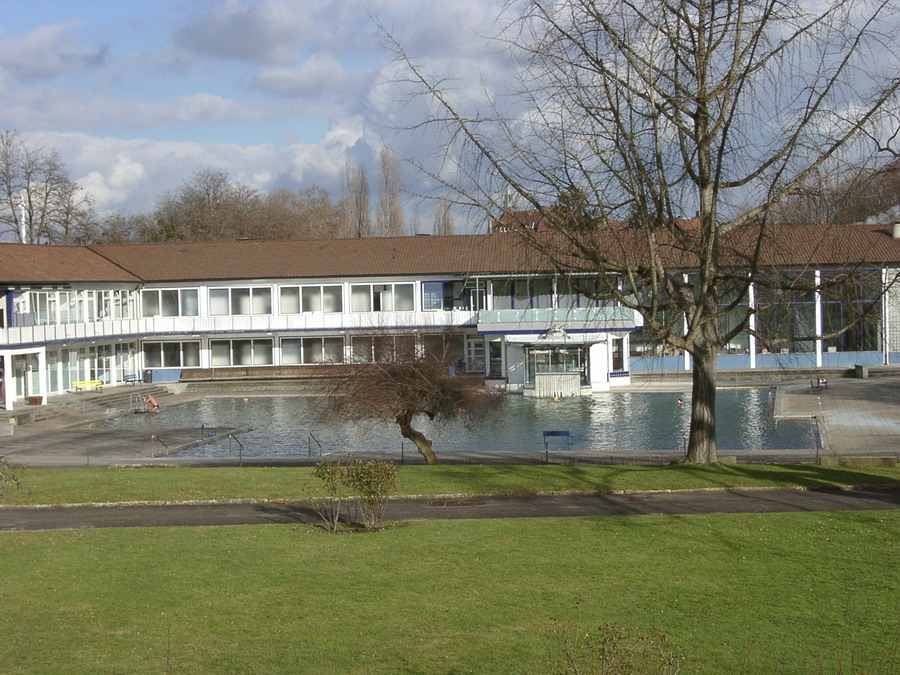
- The mineral spa that now stands on the grounds of the castle

Site information
- Type: Burgstall

Location
- Location in Baden-Württemberg Castle Berg (Germany)
- Coordinates: 3166-2:DE-BW 48°47′46″N 9°12′22″E

Castle Berg is a ruined water castle situated around 210 m (690 ft) above Sea level in the Nesenbach valley on the grounds of the Berg mineral spa in the Berg district of Baden-Württemberg's state capitol of Stuttgart, Germany.

The castle was built by the Lords von Berg during the 12th century and had already been destroyed in 1287. The foundations were unearthed in 1856 during construction of the spa's spring water bathhouses. The excavated foundations belonged to a residence tower with a square base with a side length of 10.5 m (34.45 ft) and a wall thickness of 3 m (9.84 ft).
