= Dietenheim =

- Town
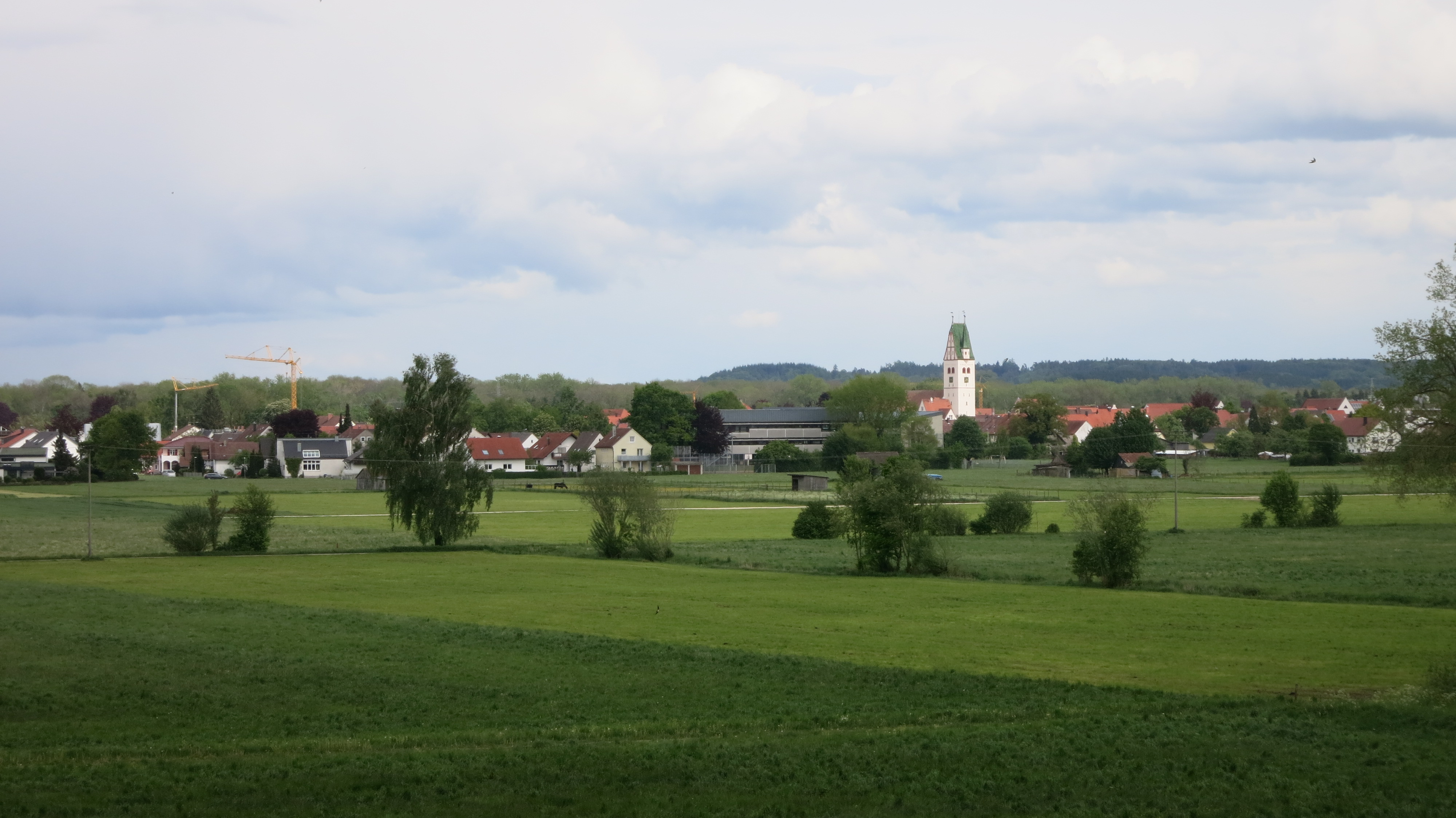

- Coat of arms

- Location of Dietenheim within Alb-Donau-Kreis district
- Interactive map of Dietenheim
- Location within Germany Location within Baden-Württemberg
- Coordinates: 48°12′43″N 10°4′24″E
- Country: Germany
- State: Baden-Württemberg
- Admin. region: Tübingen
- District: Alb-Donau-Kreis

Government
  - Mayor (2020–28): Christopher Eh (Ind.)

Area
  - Total: 18.75 km^{2} (7.24 sq mi)
- Elevation: 513 m (1,683 ft)

Population (2025-12-31)
  - Total: 6,921
  - Density: 369.1/km^{2} (956.0/sq mi)
- Time zone: UTC+01:00 (CET)
  - Summer (DST): UTC+02:00 (CEST)
- Postal codes: 89165
- Dialling codes: 07347
- Vehicle registration: UL
- Website: www.dietenheim.de

Dietenheim (German pronunciation: [ˈdiːtn̩haɪm]) is a town in the district of Alb-Donau in Baden-Württemberg in Germany. It is situated on the left bank of the Iller, 22 km (14 mi) south of Ulm.
