= Fridingen =

- Town
- Coat of arms

- Location of Fridingen within Tuttlingen district
- Interactive map of Fridingen
- Location within Germany Location within Baden-Württemberg
- Coordinates: 48°01′14″N 08°55′58″E
- Country: Germany
- State: Baden-Württemberg
- Admin. region: Freiburg
- District: Tuttlingen

Government
  - Mayor (2020–28): Stefan Waizeneggger

Area
  - Total: 22.47 km^{2} (8.68 sq mi)
- Elevation: 626 m (2,054 ft)

Population (2025-12-31)
  - Total: 3,133
  - Density: 139.4/km^{2} (361.1/sq mi)
- Time zone: UTC+01:00 (CET)
  - Summer (DST): UTC+02:00 (CEST)
- Postal codes: 78567
- Dialling codes: 07463
- Vehicle registration: TUT
- Website: www.fridingen.de

Fridingen an der Donau (German: [ˈfʁiːdɪŋən an deːɐ̯ ˈdoːnaʊ], lit. 'Fridingen on the Donau'), commonly known as Fridingen, is a town in the district of Tuttlingen, in Baden-Württemberg, Germany. It is situated on the Danube, 10 km east of Tuttlingen, and 23 km west of Sigmaringen. A large hoard of Bronze Age jewellery (mostly armlets and bracelets) was discovered in the vicinity of the town in the nineteenth century. It is now part of the British Museum's prehistoric European collection.

== Sons and daughters of the city ==
- Josef Feger (1920–2010), mayor of Leutkirch im Allgäu
- Josef Hipp (1927–1959), athlete
- Paul Ackermann (born 1939), political scientist
