= Altdischingen Castle =

- Burg Altdischingen
- Stuttgart, Baden-Württemberg; Near Weilimdorf in Germany
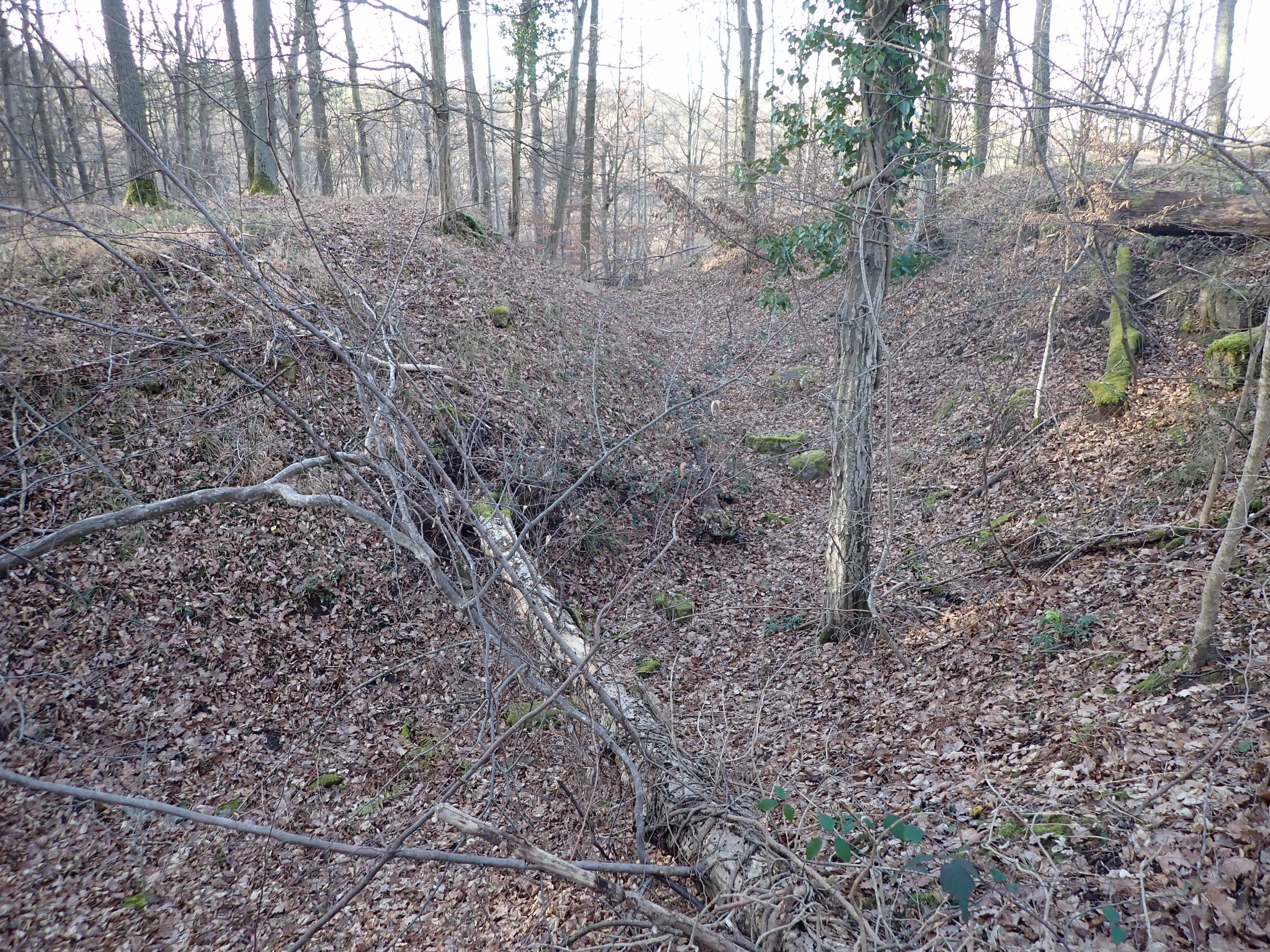
- Eastern Moat

Site information
- Type: Castle (Burgstall)

Location
- Location in Baden-Württemberg and Germany Altdischingen Castle (Germany)
- Coordinates: 48°47′39.14″N 9°6′52.29″E

Altdischingen Castle, also called the "Old Castle", is a former (Burgstall) hilltop castle around 400 m (437.45 yd) above sea level in the Solitude state forest range of Weilimdorf, a district incorporated into Baden-Württemberg's capital Stuttgart in 1933.

The castle situated 400 m (437.45 yd) south of Dischingen Castle had only been built at the end of the 11th Century and was destroyed in the mid 12th Century.

The former castle had an area of approximately 25 by 40 m (27.34 by 43.74 yd). The site is bounded by a ravine on the south, by a 2.5 to 3 m (2.73 to 3.28 yd) deep trench to the north and the east side. In front of this main ditch is an additional wall in the north and east with its own 1 m (1.09 yd) deep trench. No visible parts of the walls and buildings have been preserved above ground.
