= Hechingen-Münsingen (electoral district) =

State electoral district of Germany

61: Hechingen-Münsinger
- Electoral district for the Landtag of Baden-Württemberg
- Hechingen-Münsinger in 2026
- District: Reutlingen) and Zollernalbkreis
- Electorate: 120,709 (2026)
- Major settlements: Bad Urach, Dettingen an der Erms, Engstingen, Eningen unter Achalm, Gomadingen, Grabenstetten, Grafenberg, Hayingen, Hohenstein, Hülben, Lichtenstein, Mehrstetten, Metzingen, Münsingen, Gutsbezirk Münsingen, Pfronstetten, Riederich, Römerstein, St. Johann, Sonnenbühl, Trochtelfingen, Zwiefalten, Burladingen, Hechingen, and Jungingen

Current electoral district
- Party: CDU
- Member: Manuel Hailfinger

Hechingen-Münsinger is an electoral constituency (German: Wahlkreis) represented in the Landtag of Baden-Württemberg. Since 2026, it has elected one member via first-past-the-post voting. Voters cast a second vote under which additional seats are allocated proportionally state-wide. Under the constituency numbering system, it is designated as constituency 61. It is split between the districts of Reutlingen) and Zollernalbkreis.

== Geography ==
The constituency includes the –

- The municipalities of Bad Urach, Dettingen an der Erms, Engstingen, Eningen unter Achalm, Gomadingen, Grabenstetten, Grafenberg, Hayingen, Hohenstein, Hülben, Lichtenstein, Mehrstetten, Metzingen, Münsingen, Gutsbezirk Münsingen, Pfronstetten, Riederich, Römerstein, St. Johann, Sonnenbühl, Trochtelfingen, and Zwiefalten within the district of Reutlingen).
- The municipalities of Burladingen, Hechingen, and Jungingen, within the district of Zollernalbkreis.

There were 120,709 eligible voters in 2026.

== Members ==
=== First mandate ===
Both prior to and since the electoral reforms for the 2026 election, the winner of the plurality of the vote (first-past-the-post) in every constituency won the first mandate.

Election	Member	Party	%
1976	Theo Götz	CDU	
1980	Theo Götz	CDU	
1984	Theo Götz	CDU	
1988	Paul-Stefan Mauz	CDU	
1992	Paul-Stefan Mauz	CDU	
1996	Paul-Stefan Mauz	CDU	
2001	Karl-Wilhelm Röhm	CDU	45.9
2006	Karl-Wilhelm Röhm	CDU	48.1
2011	Karl-Wilhelm Röhm	CDU	44.5
2016	Karl-Wilhelm Röhm	CDU	28.5
2021	Cindy Holmberg	Grüne	31.6
2026	Manuel Hailfinger	CDU	38.5

=== Second mandate ===
Prior to the electoral reforms for the 2026 election, the seats in the state parliament were allocated proportionately amongst parties which received more than 5% of valid votes across the state. The seats that were won proportionally for parties that did not win as many first mandates as seats they were entitled to, were allocated to their candidates which received the highest proportion of the vote in their respective constituencies. This meant that following some elections, a constituency would have one or more members elected under a second mandate.

Prior to 2011, these second mandates were allocated to the party candidates who got the greatest number of votes, whilst from 2011-2021, these were allocated according to percentage share of the vote.

Prior to 1984, this constituency did not elect any members on a second mandate.

Election	Member	Party	Member	Party	Member	Party
1984	Walter Mogg	SPD				
1988	Walter Mogg	SPD				
1992	Walter Mogg	SPD	Rolf Wilhelm	REP		
1996			Rolf Wilhelm	REP	Horst Glück	FDP
2001	Klaus Käppeler	SPD			Horst Glück	FDP
Sep 2004	Klaus Käppeler	SPD			Renate Götting	FDP
2006						
2011	Klaus Käppeler	SPD			Andreas Glück	FDP
2016	Manuel Hailfinger	CDU	Hans Peter Stauch	AfD	Andreas Glück	FDP
Jul 2019	Manuel Hailfinger	CDU	Hans Peter Stauch	AfD	Rudi Fischer	FDP
2021			Joachim Steyer	AfD	Rudi Fischer	FDP

== Election results ==
=== 2026 election ===
State election (2026): Hechingen-Münsingen
Notes:	Blue background denotes the winner of the electorate vote. Pink background denotes a candidate elected from their party list. Yellow background denotes an electorate win by a list member, or other incumbent. A ✓ or ✗ denotes status of any incumbent, win or lose respectively.						
Party	Candidate	Votes	%	±%	Party votes	%	±%
CDU	Manuel Hailfinger	32,986	38.5	▲13.6	27,974	32.6	▲7.6
AfD	Alexander Gräff	19,450	22.7	▲10.5	20,072	23.4	▲11.2
Greens	✗ Cindy Holmberg	18,786	21.9	▼9.7	22,071	25.7	▼5.9
SPD	Yannik Hummel	5,782	6.8	▼2.2	3,640	4.2	▼4.7
FDP	Timm Kern	4,438	5.2	▼7.4	4,316	5.0	▼7.6
Left	Sonja Schneiderat	2,881	3.4	▲0.8	2,363	2.7	▲0.2
FW					1,490	1.7	▼1.2
BSW	Julius Schädler	1,301	1.5		1,372	1.6	
APT					753	0.9	
Volt					370	0.4	Steady
PARTEI					355	0.4	
Bündnis C					279	0.3	▼0.4
Values					198	0.2	
dieBasis					187	0.2	▼1.0
Pensioners					156	0.2	
ÖDP					98	0.1	▼0.4
Team Todenhöfer					88	0.1	
PdF					50	0.1	
Verjüngungsforschung					49	0.1	
Humanists					36	0.0	
KlimalisteBW					24	0.0	▼0.7
Informal votes		966			649		
Total valid votes		85,624			85,941		
Turnout		86,590	72.2	▲7.7			
CDU gain from Greens	Majority	13,536	15.8				

== See also ==
- Politics of Baden-Württemberg
- Landtag of Baden-Württemberg
