= Bad Urach =

- Town
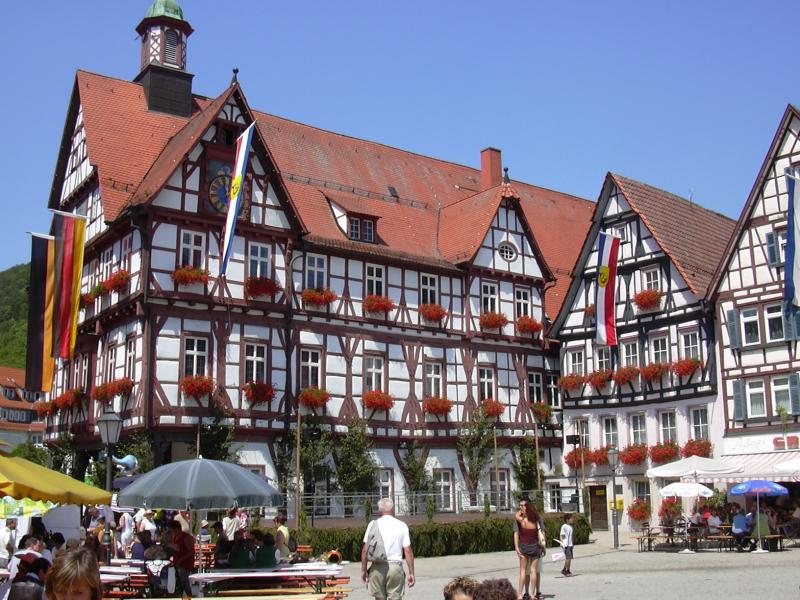
- Market square and town hall

- Flag Coat of arms

- Location of Bad Urach within Reutlingen district
- Interactive map of Bad Urach
- Location within Germany Location within Baden-Württemberg
- Coordinates: 48°29′35″N 9°23′55″E
- Country: Germany
- State: Baden-Württemberg
- District: Reutlingen
- Subdivisions: 5 districts

Government
  - Mayor (2016–24): Elmar Rebmann (SPD)

Area
  - Total: 55.42 km^{2} (21.40 sq mi)
- Elevation: 463 m (1,519 ft)

Population (2025-12-31)
  - Total: 12,705
  - Density: 229.2/km^{2} (593.8/sq mi)
- Time zone: UTC+01:00 (CET)
  - Summer (DST): UTC+02:00 (CEST)
- Postal codes: 72562–72574
- Dialling codes: 07125, 07381
- Vehicle registration: RT
- Website: www.bad-urach.de

Bad Urach (German pronunciation: [baːt ˈʔuːʁax]) is a town in the district of Reutlingen, Baden-Württemberg, Germany. It is situated 14 km east of Reutlingen, at the foot of the Swabian Jura (or Swabian Alps), and is known for its spa and therapeutic bath.

== Neighbouring communities ==
The following towns border Urach and are also part of the district of Reutlingen. Clockwise from the north are: Hülben, Grabenstetten, Römerstein, Gutsbezirk Münsingen, Münsingen, St. Johann and Dettingen an der Erms.

Bad Urach consists of the districts Hengen (687.01 ha; 854 inhabitants, on 31 December 2005), Seeburg (220.65 ha; 302 inhabitants), Sirchingen (481.78 ha; 1031 inhabitants), Bad Urach (2,797, 89 ha; 9289 inhabitants) and Wittlingen (1362.24 ha; 1112 inhabitants). With the exception of the district Bad Urach, the neighbourhoods form simultaneously villages within the meaning of the Baden-Wuerttemberg Municipal Code.

Urach includes the homestead of Güterstein. Among the districts of Hengen and Sirchingen, each include only the villages of the same name. Seeburg includes the village of Seeburg, the castle and courtyard and the village of Wittlingen, the homestead Hohenwittlingen and the individual houses, Georgenau, the pumping station Ermsgruppe XIII, including Front Albgruppe, Schanz and Villa Mühleisen. In the Hengen district is the Castle Gardena. In the district of Bad Urach are the villages Berg, Gyrenbad, Merzhausen, Hausen, Sontheim and Weiler, and in Wittlingen district are the villages Henni Fountain, Hofstetten and Winneden and Castle Baldeck.

== History ==
In the early Stone Age, the Alb was already populated, and several caves in the area show evidence that they provided shelter for the inhabitants.

During the Alemanni period, Bad Urach had an important castle. Owing to its prime location on a hill overlooking the Erms Valley, Hohenurach Castle was built around 1025. In the Middle Ages Bad Urach (at that time only known as Urach) became a centre of power. The castle became a state prison in the late Middle Ages; the poet Philipp Nikodemus Frischlin died while trying to escape over its walls in 1590. In the 18th century, the fortress was razed to the ground by the citizenry.

Around 1260, Urach became part of Württemberg. Nearly 100 years later, at the time when Württemberg was divided, the southern part of the region was governed from Urach, the so-called "secret capital", which was the residential home of the Dukes of Württemberg from 1442 until 1482. Count Eberhard the Bearded was born here in 1445 and returned there frequently throughout his life. Over the next several centuries, the town prospered and became a centre for weaving. It escaped serious damage during any wars and so remains in excellent historical condition. In 1867 a cousin of the king of Württemberg was created Duke of Urach but lived 21 kilometres (13 mi) away at Lichtenstein Castle.

Since 1985 the town has been a nationally recognized spa town.

== Geology ==
Several million years ago, the area was actively volcanic.

Due to an anomaly in the subsurface, the town has a thermal spring with water at 61 °C. The spring was developed to serve as a spa operation and mineral thermal baths.

In the early part of the 21st century a geothermal project was started, to develop electricity generation and heating in the town. The project failed in 2004 due to insufficient finance.

== Sights ==
Bad Urach possesses a late-medieval marketplace with a city hall and half-timbered houses that date from the 15th and 16th centuries.

The Residenzschloss (Castle Residence), the residential home of the Counts of Württemberg-Urach where Count Eberhard the Bearded was born, contains rooms that date from the Gothic, Renaissance, and Baroque periods. One notable feature the castle also contains is the Goldener Saal (Golden Hall), a renaissance hall.

The Church of Saint Amandus dates from 1477 and was built in the Gothic style for Eberhard the Bearded. His lavish praying desk dates from 1472. The pulpit is decorated with figures of the saints and Church Fathers and is considered an important piece of German stonemasonry. The 1518 baptismal font is by the sculptor Christoph von Urach.

Also of interest are the ruins of the old castle (Schloss Hohenurach) and the waterfall (Uracher Wasserfall) on the hiking trail up to it. The "round mountain" ("Runder Berg"), a former volcano, is of archaeological interest and shows an old Alemanni castle.

== Economy and infrastructure ==
=== Transport ===
Bundesstraße 28 runs through the city and connects it to the west with Reutlingen and Tübingen and to the east with Ulm. The B 465 leads from Bad Urach to Ehingen and Biberach.

The Erms Valley Railway connects Bad Urach with Metzingen, and there is a connection to the Plochingen-Tübingen railway.

The public transport is guaranteed by the Verkehrsverbund Neckar-Alb-Donau (NALDO). The city is located in the comb 221.

== Court, authorities and bodies ==
Bad Urach has a District Court, which belongs to the Landgerichtsbezirk Tübingen and Oberlandesgerichtsbezirk Stuttgart. Furthermore, Bad Urach has a tax office (Finanzamt) and the Ermstal Clinic is a hospital.

The city is also home to the Kirchenbezirk Bad Urach of the Evangelical-Lutheran Church in Württemberg.

== Education ==
The city is home to the Graf-Eberhard-Gymnasium and the Geschwister-Scholl-Realschule. Barbara-Gonzaga-Gemeinschaftsschule, named after Barbara Gonzaga, was opened in 2012. Wittlingen district has a primary school, two special schools, and a business school.

== Tourism ==
Bad Urach, a premier health resort and spa, is a notable tourist destination. The successful drilling for mineral thermal water and its development led to its recognition as a spa in 1983. In 2012, according to the Statistical Office of Baden-Württemberg, Bad Urach recorded 367,344 overnight stays.

== Notable people ==
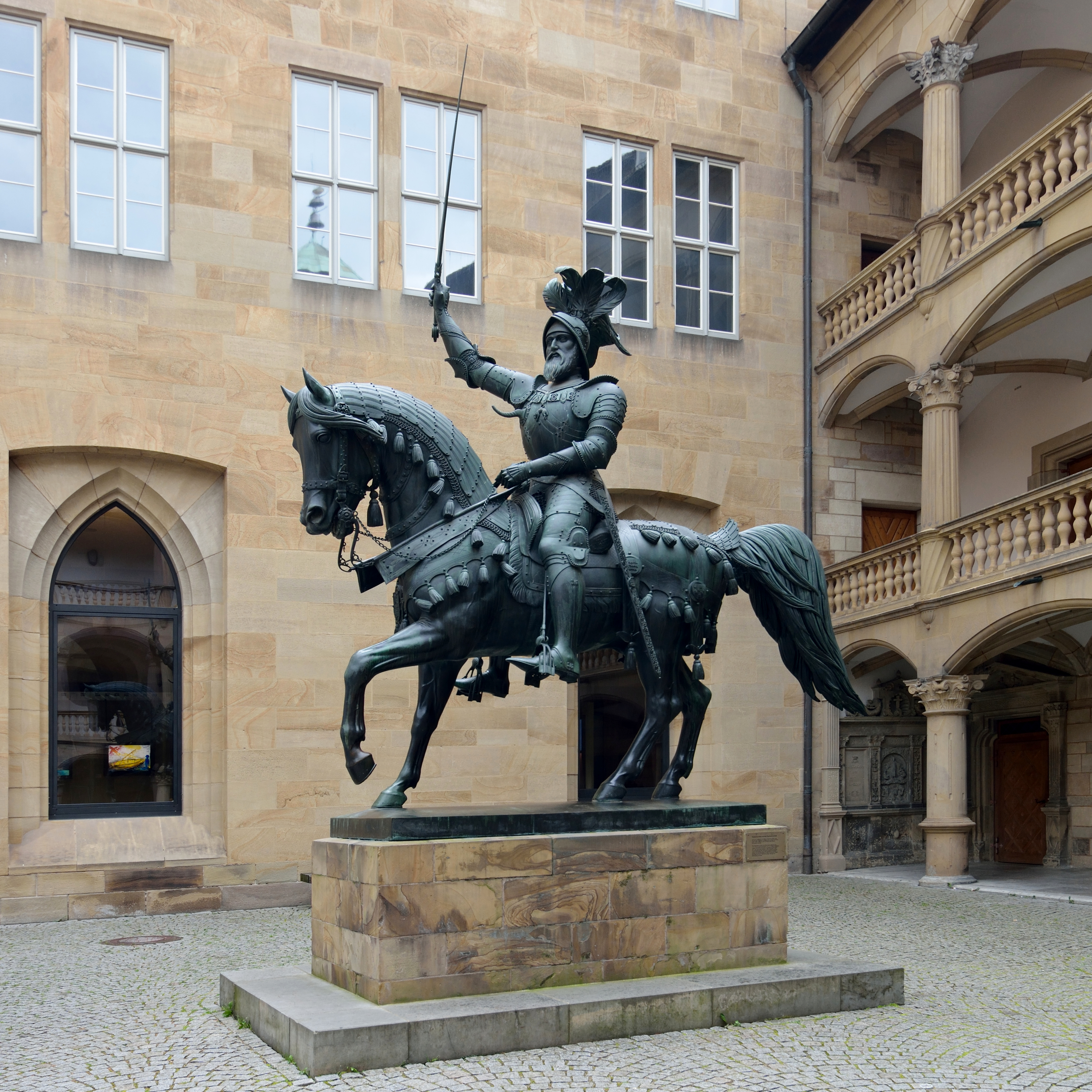
Eberhard the Bearded, Altes Schloss statue

- Gottfried von Neifen (fl. 1234–1255) Minnesinger (lyric poet).
- Eberhard the Bearded (1445–1496), first Duke of Württemberg.
- Christoph, Duke of Württemberg (1515–1568), fourth Duke of Württemberg
- Hans von Ungnad (1493–1564), Habsburg nobleman, Bible printer and smuggler
- Daniel Hauff, (DE Wiki) (1629–1665), legal advocate during the witch trials
- Charles J. Beerstecher (1851–1900), German American politician
- Ernst Jäckh (1875–1959), journalist in GB & USA, diplomat, author and academic
- Max Friz (1883–1966), one of three men responsible for the founding of BMW
- Georg Joos (1894–1959), German experimental physicist
- Reinhard Breymayer (born 1944), philologist and researcher into pietism
- Cem Özdemir (born 1965), politician with Alliance '90/The Greens, MEP from 2004 until 2009, and Agriculture minister since 2021
- Ulrike C. Tscharre, (DE Wiki) (born 1972), German actress and spokeswoman born in the town

=== Sport ===
- Markus Pleuler (born 1970), football manager and former player who played 363 games
- Marcel Schiller (born 1991), handballer who has played 39 games for Germany.
- Marvin Pieringer (born 1999), footballer who has played over 200 games
- Anna-Maria Shatokhin (born 2007), rhythmic gymnast who won medals at the World and European Championships

== Gallery ==
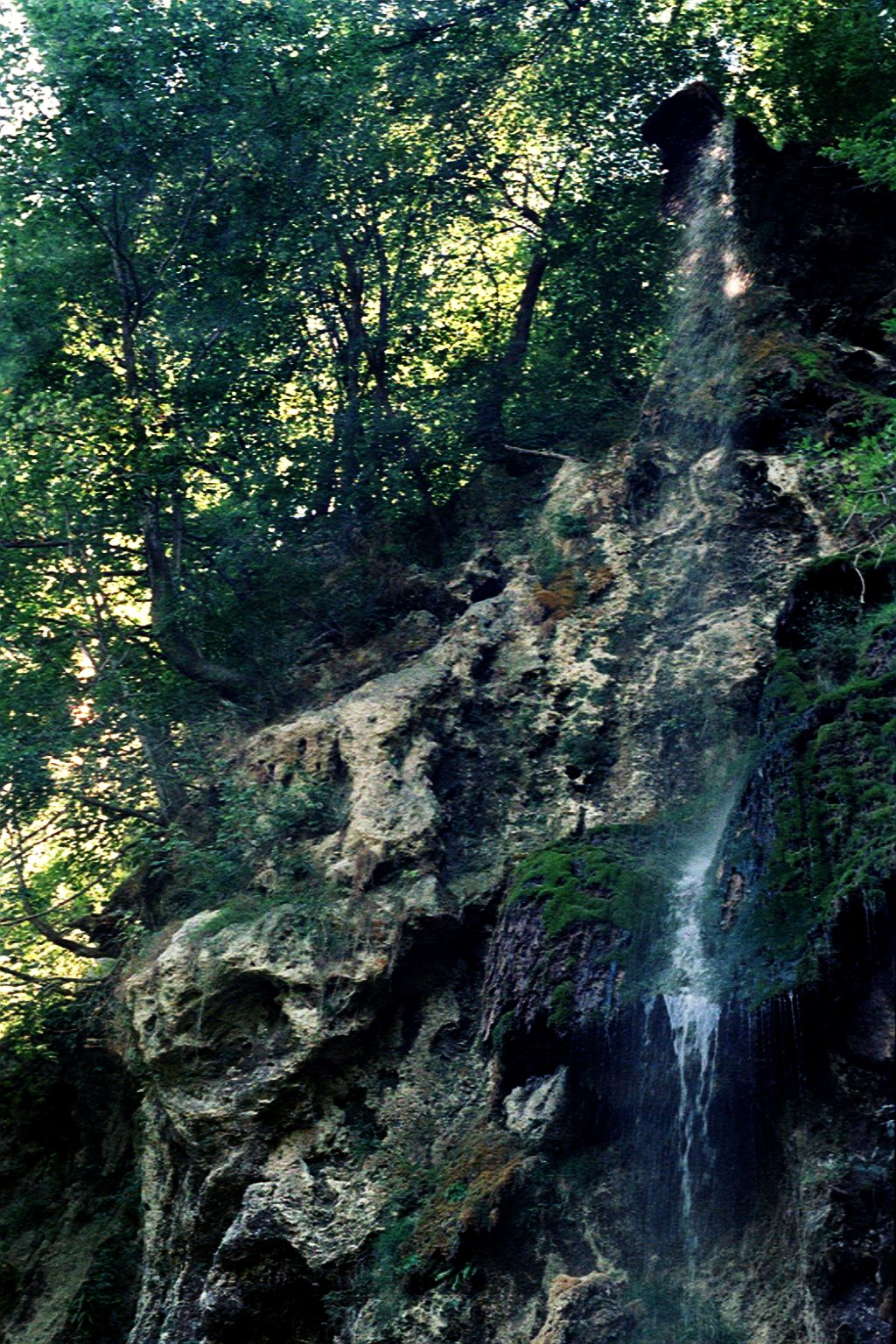
Uracher Wasserfall, 2003

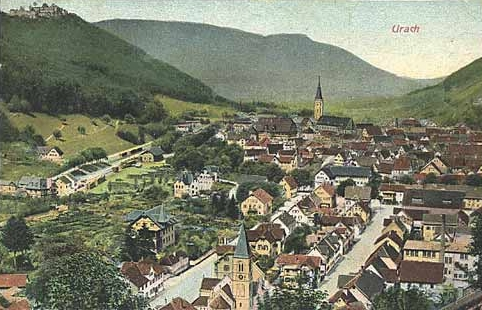
Urach, 1912

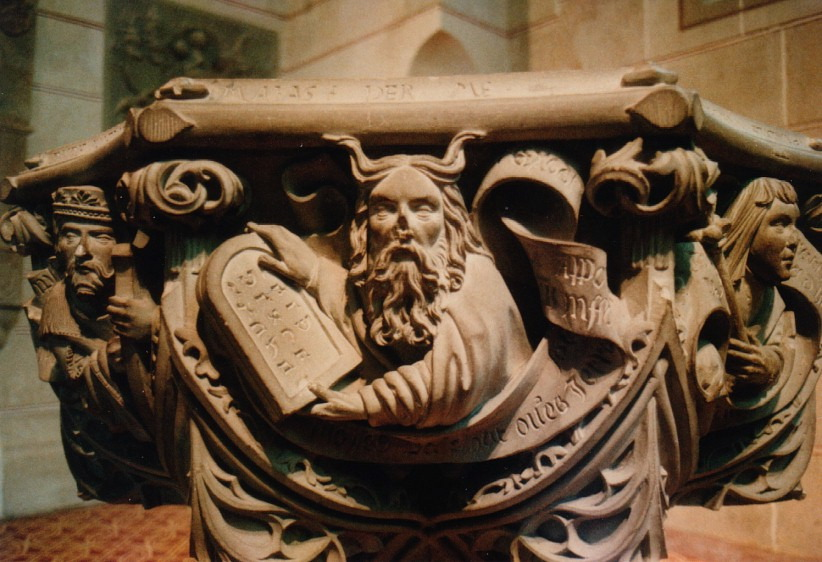
Moses on the baptismal font in the Church of St. Amandus

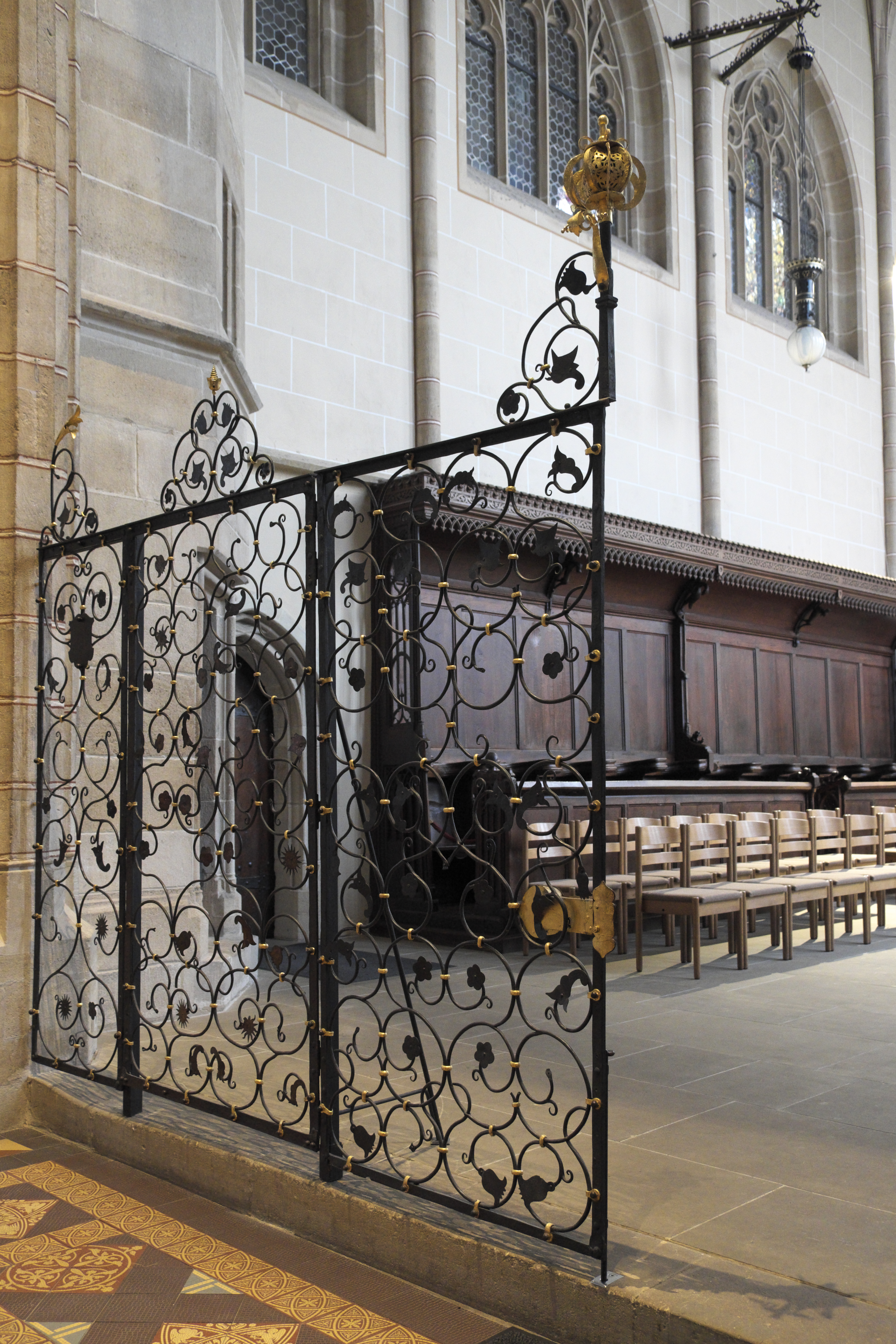
Choir-stalls, St. Amandus church

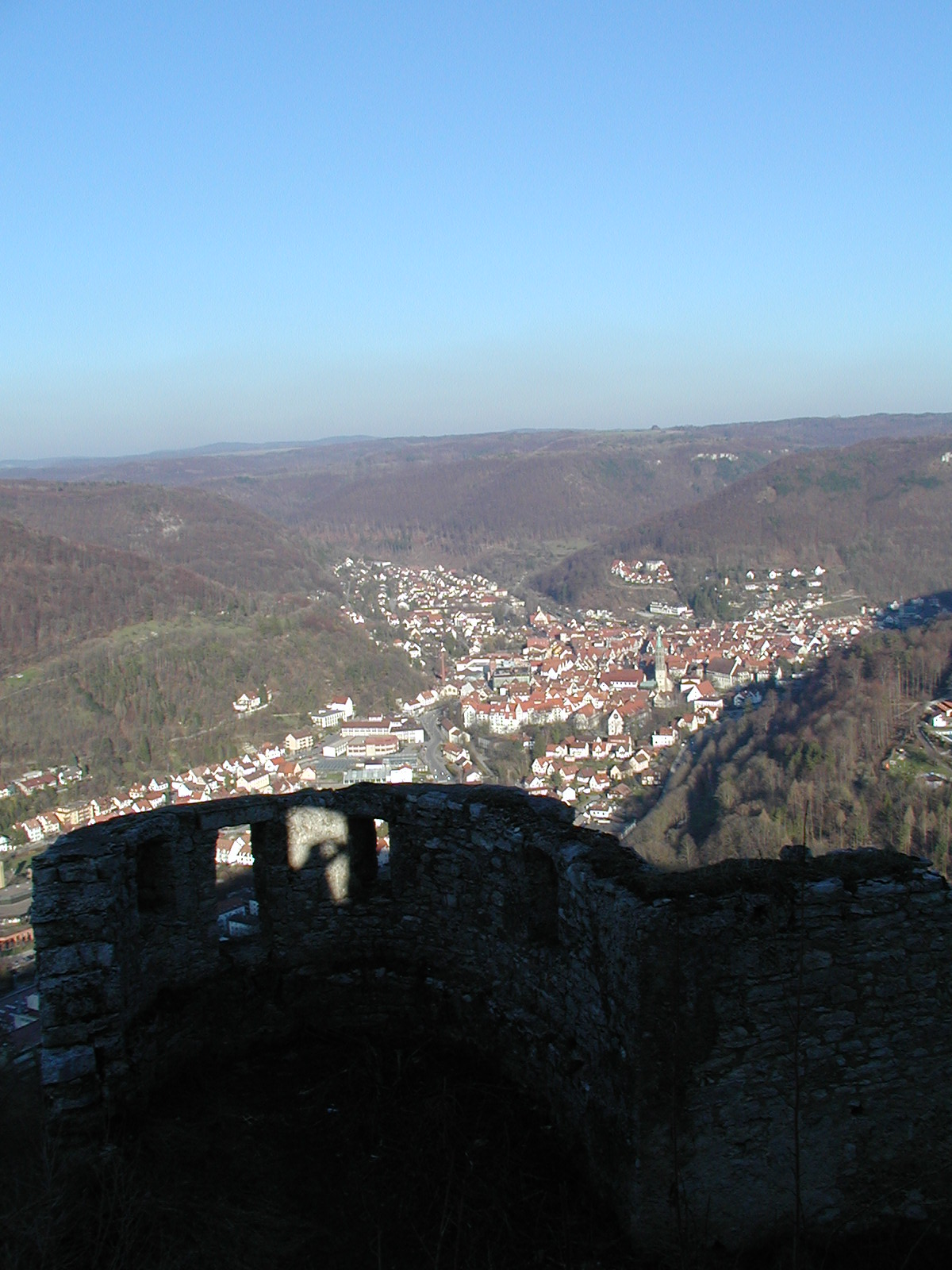
View over Urach, taken from the castle
