= Unincorporated area =

Region of land not governed by own local government

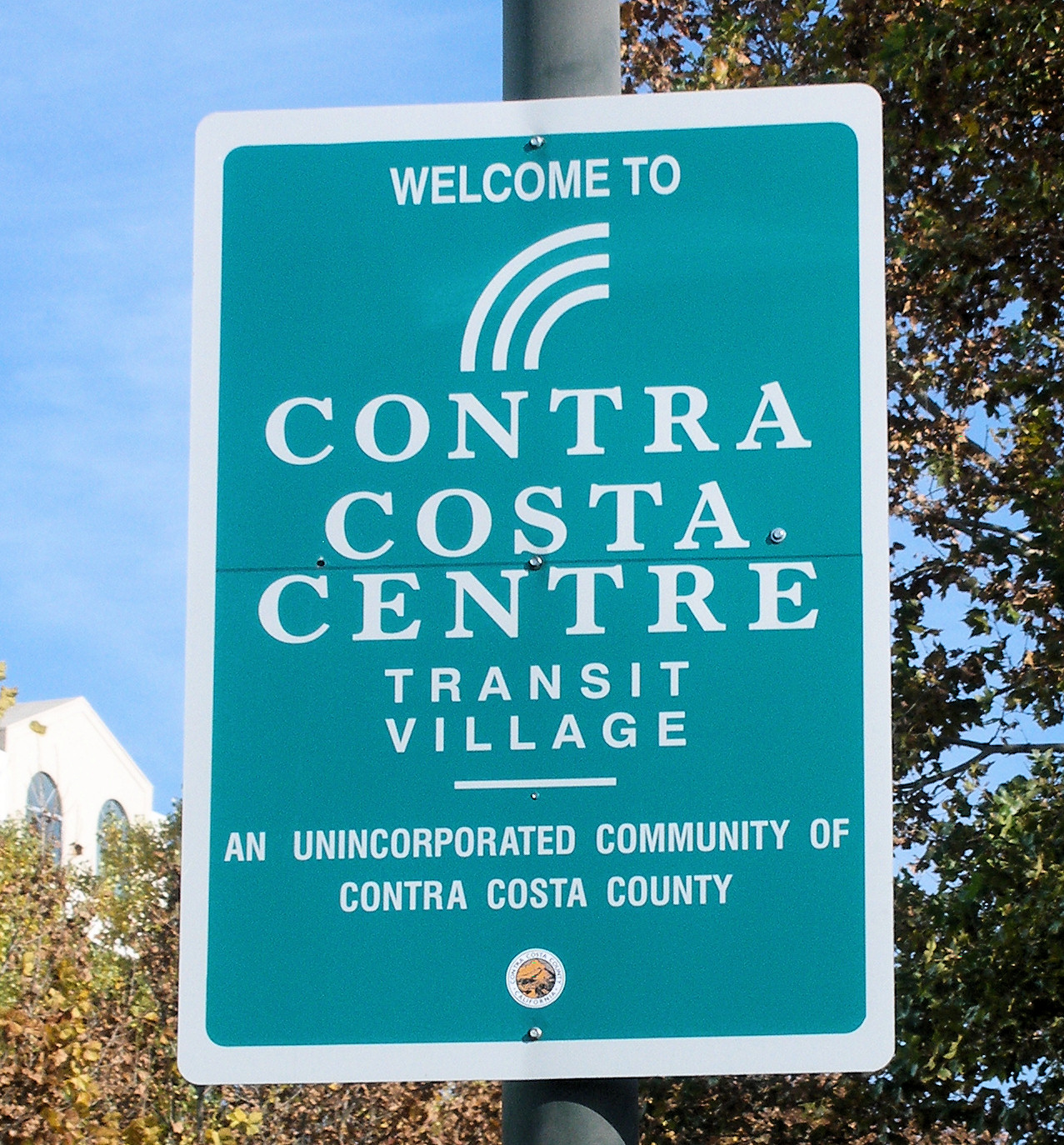
A sign at Contra Costa Centre, an unincorporated community in Contra Costa County, California, United States

An unincorporated area is a parcel of land that is not governed by a local general-purpose municipal corporation. They may be governed or serviced by an encompassing unit (such as a county) or another branch of the state (such as the military). There are many unincorporated communities and areas in the United States and Canada, while many countries do not use the concept of an unincorporated area.

== By country ==
=== Argentina ===
In Argentina, the provinces of Chubut, Córdoba, Entre Ríos, Formosa, Neuquén, Río Negro, San Luis, Santa Cruz, Santiago del Estero, Tierra del Fuego, and Tucumán have areas that are outside any municipality or commune.

=== Australia ===
Unlike many other countries, Australia has only one level of local government immediately beneath state and territorial governments. A local government area (LGA) often contains several towns and even entire metropolitan areas. Thus, aside from very sparsely populated areas and a few other unique cases, almost all of Australia is part of an LGA. Unincorporated areas are often in remote locations, cover vast areas, or have very small populations.

Postal addresses in unincorporated areas, as in other parts of Australia, normally use the suburb or locality names gazetted by the relevant state or territorial government. Thus, any ambiguity regarding addresses rarely exists in unincorporated areas.

=== Canada ===
In Canada, depending on the province, an unincorporated settlement is one that does not have a municipal council that governs solely over the settlement. It is usually, but not always, part of a larger municipal government. These range from small hamlets to large urbanized areas similar in size to a town or city.

In Alberta, unincorporated communities can be classified as Hamlet, Locality or townsite. A Hamlet is an unincorporated community that can be designated by the council of Municipal District or Specialized Municipality within their boundaries, or by the Minister of Municipal Affairs within the boundaries of an Improvement District.

For example, were they incorporated, the urban service areas of Fort McMurray in the Regional Municipality of Wood Buffalo and Sherwood Park in Strathcona County would be the fifth- and sixth-largest cities in Alberta.

Unincorporated settlements with a population between 100 and 1,000 residents may have the status of designated place in Canadian census data.

In some provinces, large tracts of undeveloped wilderness or rural country are unorganized areas that fall directly under the provincial jurisdiction. Some unincorporated settlements in such unorganized areas may have some types of municipal services provided to them by a quasigovernmental agency such as a local services board in Ontario. In New Brunswick, where a significant population lives in a local service district, taxation and services may come directly from the province.

=== Czech Republic ===
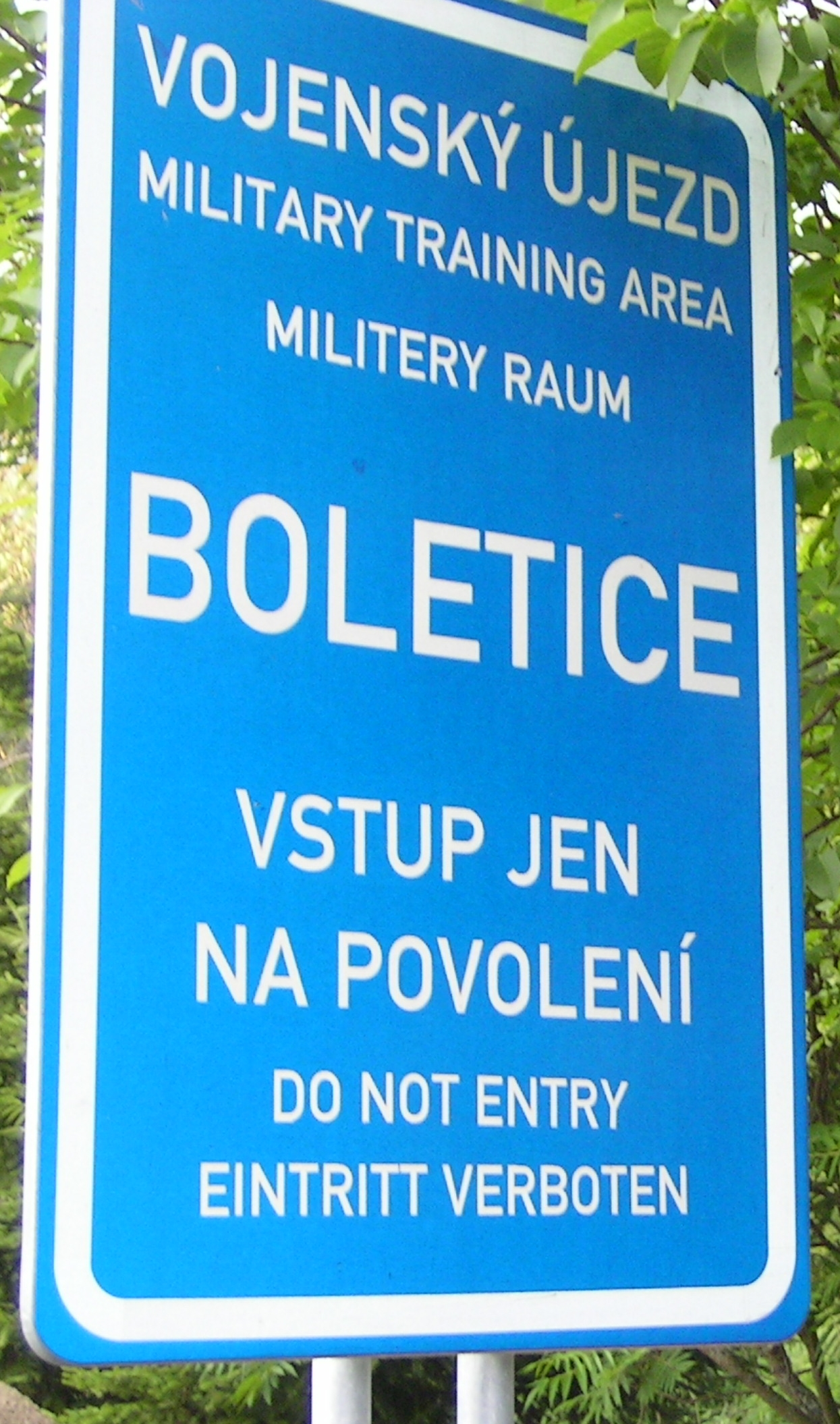
Sign prohibiting entry to the Boletice Military Training Area

The entire area of the Czech Republic is divided into municipalities; the only exceptions are for military training areas. These are parts of the regions and do not form self-governing municipalities, but are rather governed by military offices (újezdní úřad), which are subordinate to the Ministry of Defence.

Military area	Region	Civilian population (2022)	Administrative centre (outside the military areas)	Area (km^{2})
Libavá	Olomouc	0	Město Libavá	235.48
Hradiště	Karlovy Vary	0	Karlovy Vary	280.73
Boletice	South Bohemian	0	Kájov	165.44
Březina	South Moravian	0	Vyškov	149.62

Note: The Brdy Military Area was abandoned by the Army in 2015 and converted into a protected landscape area, with its area being incorporated either into existing municipalities or into newly established municipalities based on the existing settlements. The other four military training areas were reduced in size in 2015 too. The decisions on whether the settlements joined existing municipalities or formed new ones were made by plebiscites.

=== Denmark ===
Ertholmene is a small group of islands that forms the easternmost part of Denmark. This small archipelago lies 20 kilometres (12 mi) northeast of Bornholm and is the only part of metropolitan Denmark which is not part of a municipality. The islands have been under military jurisdiction since 1685 when Denmark turned Christiansø into a naval base in response to Sweden creating Karlskrona naval base a few years earlier. In 1926, the entire area was declared protected cultural heritage. It has a population of 90 people as of 2024. Statistics Denmark groups it with Bornholm in Landsdel Bornholm.

=== Germany ===
Since Germany has no administrative level comparable to the townships of other countries, the vast majority of the country, close to 99%, is organized in municipalities (German: Gemeinde, plural Gemeinden), often consisting of multiple settlements that are not considered to be unincorporated. Because these settlements lack a council of their own, usually an Ortsvorsteher or Ortsvorsteherin (village chairman / chairwoman) is appointed by the municipal council, except in the very smallest villages.

In 2000, the number of unincorporated areas in Germany, called gemeindefreie Gebiete (municipality-free areas) or singular gemeindefreies Gebiet, was 295 with a total area of 4,890 km^{2} (1,890 sq mi) and around 1.4% of its territory. However, these are mostly unpopulated areas such as forests, lakes and their surroundings, military training areas, and the like.

As of 31 December 2007, Germany had 248 uninhabited unincorporated areas (of which 214 are located in Bavaria), not belonging to any municipality, consisting mostly of forested areas, lakes, and larger rivers. Also, three inhabited unincorporated areas exist, all of which served as military training areas: Osterheide and Lohheide in Lower Saxony, and Gutsbezirk Münsingen in Baden-Württemberg. They have fewer than 2,000 inhabitants in total. Gutsbezirk Münsingen has become uninhabited after losing its inhabited parts to adjacent municipalities on 1 January 2011.

==== Largest ====
The following shows the largest unincorporated areas in Germany (including all inhabited areas, but excluding lakes) with an area of more than 50 km^{2} (19 sq mi):

Regional number	Name	District	State	Area (km^{2})	Population (31 Dec. 2010)
031530000504	Harz (Landkreis Goslar)	Goslar	Lower Saxony	371.76	–
031560000501	Harz (Landkreis Göttingen)	Göttingen	Lower Saxony	267.35	–
066330000200	Gutsbezirk Reinhardswald	Kassel	Hessen	182.58	–
033580000501	Osterheide	Heidekreis	Lower Saxony	177.99	762
031550000501	Solling	Northeim	Lower Saxony	177.49	–
033510000501	Lohheide	Celle	Lower Saxony	91.32	716
064350000200	Gutsbezirk Spessart	Main-Kinzig-Kreis	Hessen	89.30	–
091800000451	Ettaler Forst	Garmisch-Partenkirchen	Bavaria	83.46	–
084150000971	Gutsbezirk Münsingen	Reutlingen	Baden-Württemberg	64.68	160 (Note: No inhabitants since 1 January 2011 as a result of reduction in area.)
010535303105	Sachsenwald	Herzogtum Lauenburg	Schleswig-Holstein	58.49	–
094720000468	Veldensteiner Forst	Bayreuth	Bavaria	55.60	–
033540000502	Göhrde	Lüchow-Dannenberg	Lower Saxony	51.81	–
033540000501	Gartow	Lüchow-Dannenberg	Lower Saxony	50.92	–
066360000200	Gutsbezirk Kaufunger Wald	Werra-Meißner-Kreis	Hessen	50.32	–

In Bavaria, there are other contiguous unincorporated areas covering an area of more than 50 km^{2} (19 sq mi) which are however composed of several adjacent unincorporated areas, each one of which is under 50 km^{2} in area.

=== Israel ===
In Israel, almost all land is subdivided into 393 municipalities which are further classified, normally by population, as city, local council, or regional council. All three types of municipality provide services, including zoning and planning.

However, a few unincorporated areas exist, whether because of omissions and ambiguities left in official maps dating from the British Mandate for Palestine, or due to deliberate policy of ensuring facilities of national importance, such as Ben Gurion Airport, Mikveh Israel boarding school, or the BAZAN Group oil refineries, would not have their operation affected by local considerations.

The largest unincorporated area in Israel is the so-called "Reservation area" (Hebrew: אזור הסייג, Arabic: منطقة السياج), a triangular region whose vertexes are Beersheba, Dimona and Arad, in which all Negev Bedouins were concentrated in the 1950s. As no municipal services are provided within unincorporated areas, this effectively makes all Bedouin settlements in the area unrecognized, with the sole exception of those that were included from 2003 within the Abu Basma Regional Council. On 5 November 2012 that council was split into two new councils, Neve Midbar Regional Council and al-Kasom Regional Council.

=== Netherlands ===
The Netherlands has had regular periods with unincorporated land when newly reclaimed land polders fall dry. Unincorporated land has, since medieval times, been administered by an appointed officer with the name Landdrost or Drossaart. Also, Elten and Tudderen, both annexed from Germany after World War II, were governed by a Landdrost until they were ceded back to Germany in 1963.

The most recent period with unincorporated land started in 1967, when the dyke around Southern Flevoland was closed, but several years are required before the polder is genuinely accessible for cultivation, and construction of roads and homes can start, as in the first years, the soil is equivalent to quicksand. During the initial period of inhabitation, a special, government-appointed officer was installed, the landdrost. During the administrative office of a Landdrost, no municipal council forms.

In 1975, the first homes in what is now the city of Almere were built, and from 1976 to 1984, the area was governed by the Landdrost as the executive of the Openbaar Lichaam Zuidelijke IJsselmeerpolders (Southern IJsselmeerpolders Public Body). In 1984, the Landdrost became the first mayor of the new city Almere. Since that date, the Netherlands does not have any unincorporated land areas.

The Openbaar Lichaam remained, however, only governing the water body of the Markermeer. After the municipal division of the Wadden Sea (1985), the territorial waters in the North Sea (1991) and the IJsselmeer (1994), all water bodies are now also part of a municipality and no unincorporated areas exist in the Netherlands anymore. The Openbaar Lichaam Zuidelijke IJsselmeerpolders was dissolved in 1996.

=== New Zealand ===
The New Zealand outlying islands are offshore island groups that are part of New Zealand. The Chatham Islands is the only island group among these that are populated and it has its own territorial authority. Most of the other island groups are not part of any administrative region or district, but are instead each designated as an Area Outside Territorial Authority.

=== Norway ===
In Norway, the outlying islands of Bouvet Island, Jan Mayen, and Svalbard are outside of all of the country's counties and municipalities. They are ruled directly by national authorities without any local democracy. An exception is the Longyearbyen Community Council in Svalbard, which since 2004 in reality acts partly like a Norwegian municipality. Svalbard has a governor appointed by the government of Norway, ruling the area. Jan Mayen has no population, only radio and weather stations with staff, whose manager has the responsibility for the activities. Bouvet Island has only occasional visitors.

=== United States ===
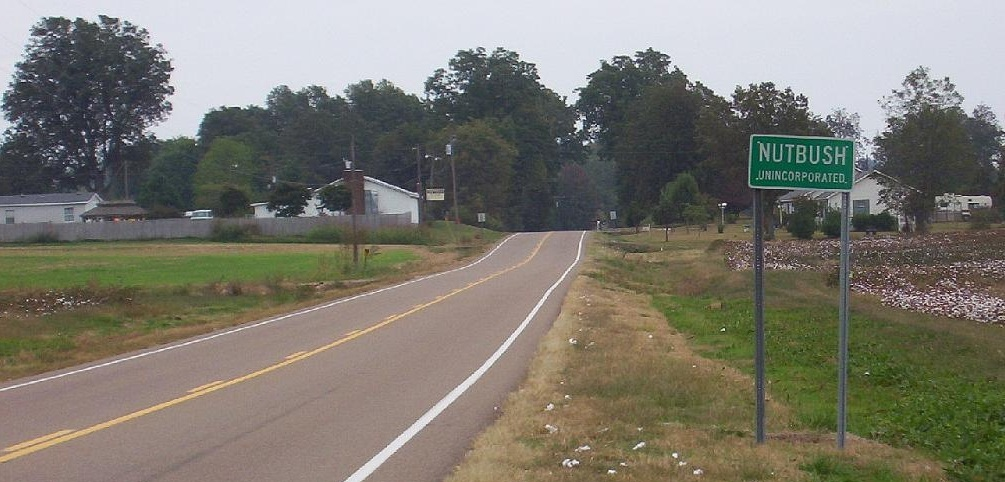
Nutbush, an unincorporated area in Haywood County, Tennessee

In local government in the United States, the term "unincorporated area" usually refers to the part of a county that is outside of any general-purpose municipal government. An unincorporated community is one general term for a geographic area having a common social identity without municipal organization or official political designation (i.e., incorporation as a city or town). The two main types of unincorporated communities are:

- a neighborhood or other community existing within one or across multiple existing incorporated areas (i.e., cities or towns). In this sense, a community is part of a municipal government but not separately incorporated from it. For example, Hyannis, Massachusetts, is an unincorporated village within the town of Barnstable, and Intervale, New Hampshire, is an unincorporated community on the border of the towns of Bartlett and Conway. Also Sienna, Texas is an unincorporated community on the border of Missouri City.
- a neighborhood or other community existing outside an incorporated municipal government. In this sense, the community is outside any municipal government and is entirely unincorporated. Examples include Hovland, Minnesota; Nutbush, Tennessee; and Yucca, Arizona; all are small rural settlements of low population.

Most states have granted some form of home rule, so that county commissions (or boards or councils) have the same powers in these areas as city councils or town councils have in their respective incorporated areas. Some states instead put these powers in the hands of townships, which are minor civil divisions of each county and are called "towns" in some states.

Differences in state laws regarding the incorporation of communities leads to a great variation in the distribution and nature of unincorporated areas. Unincorporated regions are essentially nonexistent in eight of the northeastern states. All of the land in New Jersey, Connecticut, Massachusetts, New York, and Rhode Island, and nearly all of the land in New Hampshire, Pennsylvania, and Vermont, is part of an incorporated area of some type. In these areas, types (and official names) of local government entities can vary. In New England (which includes five of those eight states, plus the less fully incorporated state of Maine), local municipalities are known as towns or cities, and most towns are administered by a form of direct democracy, such as the open town meeting or representative town meeting. Larger towns in New England may be incorporated as cities, with some form of mayor-council government. In New Jersey, multiple types exist, as well, such as city, township, town, borough, or village, but these differences are in the structure of the legislative branches, not in the powers or functions of the entities themselves.

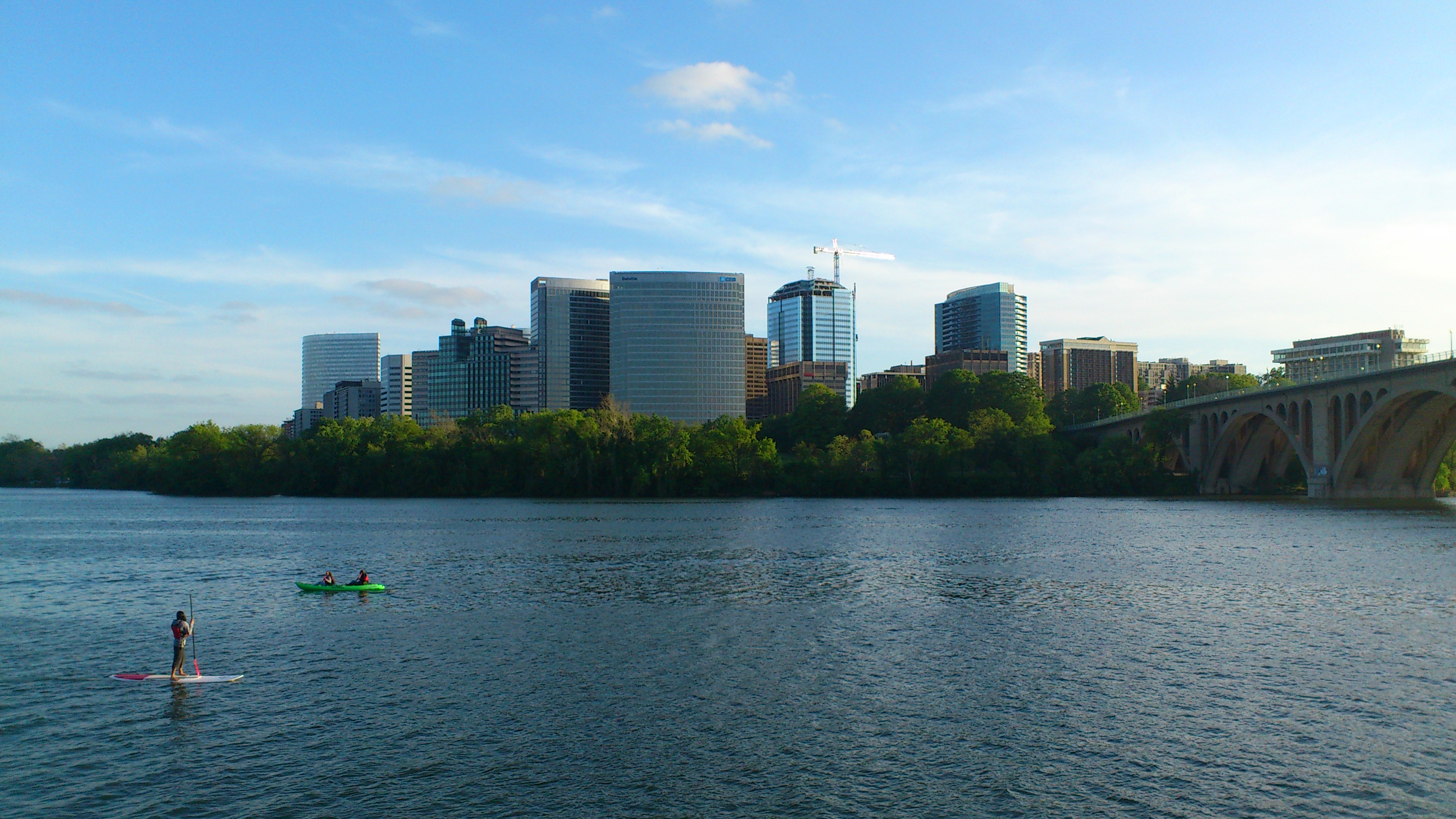
Rosslyn, one of many high-rise neighborhoods in Arlington County, Virginia. The county has no cities within its borders, and five times the population density of the state's most populous city, Virginia Beach.

On the opposite end of the spectrum is the Virginia "strong county" model. Virginia and other states with this model, such as Alabama, Maryland, and Tennessee, set strict requirements on incorporation or grant counties broad powers that in other states are carried out by cities, creating a disincentive to incorporate, and thus have large urbanized areas which have no municipal government below the county level.

In mid-Atlantic states such as New York and Pennsylvania, a hybrid model that tries to balance the two approaches is prevalent, with differing allocations of power between municipalities and counties existing.

In Nevada, an adjunct of the county commission called unincorporated towns may be created by a community following a successful petition and election. Unincorporated towns elect members of a town advisory board, which advises the board of county commissioners in general, but has specific and limited powers similar to that of an incorporated city. Unincorporated towns can issue and service town bonds and establish ad valorem taxes, regulate zoning within its jurisdiction, and build and maintain infrastructure such as sidewalks, roads, parks, and other similar public works.

Throughout the U.S., some large cities have annexed all surrounding unincorporated areas within their counties, creating what are known as consolidated city–county forms of government (e.g., Jacksonville, Florida, and Nashville, Tennessee). In these cases, unincorporated areas continue to exist in other counties of the metropolitan area. Conversely, a county island is surrounded on most or all sides by municipalities. In areas of sparse population, the majority of the land in any given state may be unincorporated.

Some states, including Indiana and North Carolina, grant extraterritorial jurisdiction to cities and towns (but rarely villages) so that they may control zoning for a limited distance into adjacent unincorporated areas, often as a precursor (and sometimes as a legal requirement) to later annexation of those areas. This is especially useful in rural counties that have no zoning at all, or only spot zoning for unincorporated communities.

In California, all counties except the City and County of San Francisco have unincorporated areas. Even in highly populated counties, the unincorporated portions may contain a large number of inhabitants. In Los Angeles County, the county government estimates the population of its unincorporated areas to exceed one million people. Despite having 88 incorporated cities and towns, including the state's most populous, 65% of the land in Los Angeles County is unincorporated, this mostly consisting of Angeles National Forest and sparsely populated regions to its north. In California, the state constitution recognizes only one kind of municipality, the city. The California Government Code allows cities to call themselves towns, if they wish, although the designation is purely cosmetic.

==== Insular areas ====
In the context of the insular areas of the United States, the word "unincorporated" refers to territories in which the United States Congress has determined that only selected parts of the Constitution of the United States apply and which have not been formally incorporated into the United States by Congress. Currently, the five major unincorporated U.S. insular areas are American Samoa, Guam, the Northern Mariana Islands, Puerto Rico, and the U.S. Virgin Islands. Unincorporated insular areas can be ceded to another nation or be granted independence. The U.S. has one incorporated insular area, Palmyra Atoll. Incorporation is regarded as perpetual by the U.S. federal government; once incorporated, the territory cannot be disincorporated. The United States Minor Outlying Islands without a permanent civilian population are "unorganized" in the sense that they do not have a local government, and they are administered by the Office of Insular Affairs directly. The populated American Samoa is "unorganized" in the sense that Congress has not passed an organic act, but it does have a constitution and locally elected territorial legislature and executive.

==== U.S. Census Bureau ====
An unincorporated community may be part of a census-designated place (CDP). A CDP is an area defined by the United States Census Bureau for statistical purposes only. It is a populated area that generally includes one officially designated but currently unincorporated community for which the CDP is named, plus surrounding inhabited countryside of varying dimensions, and occasionally other smaller unincorporated communities as well. Otherwise, it has no legal status.

The Census Bureau designates some unincorporated areas as "unorganized territories", as defined by the U.S. Census Bureau where portions of counties are not included in any legally established minor civil division (MCD) or independent incorporated place. These occur in 10 MCD states: Arkansas, Indiana, Iowa, Louisiana, Maine, Minnesota, North Carolina, North Dakota, Ohio, and South Dakota. The census recognizes such separate pieces of territory as one or more separate county subdivisions for statistical purposes. It assigns each unorganized territory a descriptive name, followed by the designation "unorganized territory". Unorganized territories were first used for statistical purposes in conjunction with the 1960 census.

At the 2000 census there were 305 of these territories within the United States. Their total land area was 85,392 square miles (221,165 km^{2}) and they had a total population of 247,331. South Dakota had the most unorganized territories, 102, as well as the largest amount of land under that status: 39,785 square miles (103,042 km^{2}), or 52.4% of the state's land area. North Dakota followed with 86 territories, 20,358 square miles (52,728 km^{2}), or 29.5% of its land area. Maine was next with 36 territories, 14,052 square miles (36,396 km^{2}), or 45.5% of its land area. Minnesota had 71 territories, 10,552 square miles (27,330 km^{2}), or 13% of its land area. Several other states had small amounts of unorganized territory. The unorganized territory with the largest population was Camp Lejeune, North Carolina, a United States Marine Corps base with a census population of 34,452 inhabitants.

In the 2010 census, unorganized territory areas were identified in nine U.S. states: Arkansas, Indiana, Iowa, Maine, Minnesota, New York, North Carolina, North Dakota, and South Dakota.

==== U.S. mail delivery ====
Many unincorporated communities are also recognized as acceptable place names for use in mailing addresses by the United States Postal Service (USPS) (indeed, some have their own post offices), and the Census Bureau uses the names of some widely recognized unincorporated communities for its CDPs for which it tabulates census data. In some instances, unincorporated areas have a mailing address indicating the name of an incorporated city, as well as those where residents of one incorporated city have mailing addresses indicating another incorporated city. Mailing addresses do not necessarily change when an area becomes a part of an incorporated place, changes to another incorporated place, or disincorporates. For example, places in Kingwood, Texas, previously unincorporated, retained "Kingwood, TX" mailing addresses after the 1996 annexation of Kingwood into the city of Houston. The Houston city government stated on its website, "The U.S. Postal Service establishes ZIP codes and mailing addresses to maximize the efficiency of their system, not to recognize jurisdictional boundaries."

The USPS is very conservative about recognizing new place names for use in mailing addresses and typically only does so when a place incorporates. The original place name associated with a ZIP Code is still maintained as the default place name, even though the name of the newly incorporated place is more accurate. As an example, Sandy Springs is one of the most populated places in Georgia but is served by a branch of the Atlanta post office. Only after the city was incorporated in 2005 was "Sandy Springs" approved for use in mailing addresses, though "Atlanta" remains the default name. Accordingly, "Atlanta" is the only accepted place name for mailing addresses in the nearby unincorporated town of Vinings, also served by a branch of the Atlanta post office, even though Vinings is in Cobb County and Atlanta is in Fulton and DeKalb counties. In contrast, prior to its reincorporation, neighboring Mableton had not been incorporated in nearly a century, but has its own post office and thus "Mableton" is the only acceptable place name for mailing addresses in much of the area. The areas of Dulah and Faria, California, which are unincorporated areas in Ventura County between Ventura and Carpinteria, have the ZIP Code of 93001, which is assigned to the post office at 675 E. Santa Clara St. in Ventura; thus, all mail to those two areas is addressed to Ventura.

If an unincorporated area becomes incorporated, it may be split among ZIP Codes, and its new name may be recognized as acceptable for use with some or all of them in mailing addresses, as has been the case in Johns Creek and Milton, Georgia. If an incorporated area disincorporates, though, this has no effect on whether a place name is "acceptable" in a mailing address or not, as is the case with Lithia Springs, Georgia. ZIP Code boundaries often ignore political boundaries, so the appearance of a place name in a mailing address alone does not indicate whether the place is incorporated or unincorporated.

==== Populated place ====
Unincorporated areas with permanent populations in the United States are defined by the United States Geological Survey as "populated places", a "place or area with clustered or scattered buildings, and a permanent human population (city, settlement, town, village)." No legal boundaries exist, although a corresponding "civil" record may occur, the boundaries of which may or may not match the perceived populated place.

=== Other nations ===
Some nations have some exceptional unincorporated areas:

- The Lok Ma Chau Loop in Hong Kong is the only part of China not incorporated into any third-level administrative division.
- The Kingdom of Denmark has three unincorporated areas:
  - In Denmark proper, the former naval fortress Ertholmene east of Bornholm with less than 100 inhabitants is still governed directly by the Ministry of Defence.
  - In Greenland, all land is incorporated except for the Northeast Greenland National Park and the Pituffik Space Base.
- In France, all land is incorporated except for Clipperton Island, a small overseas island possession held as an overseas state private property under the direct authority of the French government, administered by France's Overseas Minister.
- In France, the territory is subdivided into 36,685 communes (municipalities). An elected council and a mayor form the governing body of a municipality. This applies to mainland France and to overseas departments and regions, however, some territories like Clipperton Island are not incorporated. Six communes depopulated during World War I were maintained incorporated for memorial reasons, although they have no population.
- In India, there are several union territories (central government administered regions). Unlike the states of India, which have their own governments, union territories are federal territories governed, in part or in whole, by the Government of India. Many of these were created at the time of India's independence or after being acquired from non-British colonial powers or princely states.
- Azad Kashmir has no official status in Pakistani law, but is nonetheless de facto governed by Pakistan.
- Slovakia is divided into municipalities. There are two types of municipalities: towns (mesto, pl. mestá) and villages (obec, pl. obce), with minor differences between them. Additionally, there are several military areas which are not part of any municipality. Each military area is a municipality of its own right. However, the military areas hold no elections and have no mayors or other elected representatives. Instead, they are administered directly by the Slovak Ministry of Defence.
- In Spain, the Spanish Constitution of 1978 says that the land is divided into autonomous communities, provinces, and municipalities. Each of these has certain powers determined by law. Autonomous Communities and municipalities are enabled to appeal to the Constitutional Court any public decision that violates their autonomy by other entities (State or Autonomous Community power).
  Nevertheless, some regions, like Navarre, have some unincorporated areas. The largest of these, the Bardenas Reales, has a surface of 418 km^{2} (161 sq mi) and is governed by a board of representatives of 20 bordering municipalities, a valley in the Pyrenees, and a monastery, all of which have rights to use the area. The plazas de soberanía also functions as de facto unincorporated areas under the administration of the Spanish Ministry of Defence.
- Switzerland also has a few exceptions: 22 lakes and a forest, as described by the Swiss federal statistical office (See: Gemeindefreie Gebiete (in German)).
- In Ukraine, all land is divided into hromadas except for the Chernobyl Exclusion Zone. The latter contains parts of Kyiv Oblast and Zhytomyr Oblast and is directly administered by a designated government agency.

== Countries without unincorporated areas ==
Many countries, especially those with many centuries of history with multiple tiers of local government, do not use the concept of an unincorporated area.

- All territories of Albania, Austria, Belgium, Bosnia and Herzegovina, Croatia, Estonia, Finland, Metropolitan France, Greece, Italy, Japan, Lithuania, Montenegro, the Netherlands, the Philippines, Poland, Portugal, Serbia, Slovenia, South Korea, peninsular Spain and Sweden are divided into municipalities.
- In Brazil, Chile, Colombia, and Mexico, all land must belong to a municipality. Even large uninhabited areas, such as forests or grasslands, are, by law, part of the nearest "city". This is because in Latin America, a "municipality" in some senses is the equivalent of what in the United States and Canada is called a "county".

=== Further information ===
- In Mainland China, every piece of land belongs to a county-level (third level) administrative division (equivalent to a municipality), either a district (区; qū) in an urban area, or a county-level city (县级市; xiànjíshì), county (县; xiàn) or banner (旗; qí). There is also a township-level (fourth level) administrative division, which may be a subdistrict (街道; jiēdào), town (镇; zhèn), township (乡; xiāng), or sum (苏木; sūmù).
- In Croatia, every piece of land belongs either to a city (grad) or to a municipality (općina).
- In Estonia, the entire territory is divided into 79 municipalities (omavalitsused), of which 14 are municipal towns (linnad) and 65 are parishes (vallad). The entire territory of the country is divided into settlements of four types: towns, boroughs, small boroughs and villages.
- In Indonesia, every piece of land belongs to a municipality (kota) or a regency (kabupaten).
- In Japan, every piece of land belongs to a municipality (市区町村, shikuchōson), of which there are four types: cities (市, shi); the special wards of Tokyo (特別区, tokubetsu-ku), towns (町, chō / machi) and villages (村, son / mura). Also, the four southernmost islands of Hachijō Subprefecture are currently not part of any municipality as the town of Hachijō and village of Aogashima both claim administrative rights; they are directly controlled by that subprefecture instead.
- In Peru, the whole territory is divided into districts (distritos), which form provinces (provincias), which form regions (regiones). Some districts, especially in the Amazon, are vast portions of territory, but they are governed from a district capital (which can be anywhere from a city to a small village).
- In the Philippines, all land belongs to either a city (lungsod or siyudad) or a municipality (bayan / munisipalidad / munisipyo), which are further subdivided into barangays.
- In Portugal, the constitution defines territorial divisions as freguesias (parishes), municipalities (município or concelho), and administrative regions (regiões administrativas). It has no official definition of city limits, so a city may include several parishes, or a parish may cover several villages or townships, but a municipality is usually administered from the city or town that bears its name.
- In South Africa, the constitution gives every place in the country democratically elected third-tier government.
- In South Korea, every piece of land belongs to a municipality (기초지방자치단체; gichojibang jachidanche), either a district (구; gu) in a city (시; shi) or a town (읍; eub) or township (면; myeon) in a county (군; gun). For some townships near the DMZ that having no township office, the head of nearby township serves as a head.
- In Sweden, all territory is divided into municipalities (kommuner). Sweden has post-glacial rebound, so the land area is increasing, but municipal boundaries extend into the sea, so new land is not unincorporated.
- In the Taiwan Area (Taiwan Island, Penghu, Kinmen, Matsu, and some minor islands), every piece of land belongs to either a township (鎮; zhèn or 鄉; xiāng) or a county-administered city (縣轄市; xiànxiáshì) in a county (縣; xiàn), or a district (區; qū) in a provincial city (市; shì). There are, in total, 368 townships, county-administered cities and districts in Taiwan.
- In the United Kingdom:
  - In England, all land is within a county or local government district, both of which exercise power over their jurisdictions.
  - In Northern Ireland, all land is within one of 11 local government districts (cheantar).
  - In Scotland, all land is within one of 32 unitary authorities designated as council areas (comhairlean).
  - In Wales, all land is within one of 22 single-tier principal areas (prif ardaloedd).

== See also ==
- County Island
- Fire sign (address)
- Main Road Town
- Unorganized area
- Unorganized Borough, Alaska, an area without county-level government.
- Unparished area, areas of England outside any civil parish
