= Friedrich Wilhelm Schnitzler =

German landowner, business manager and politician (1928–2011)

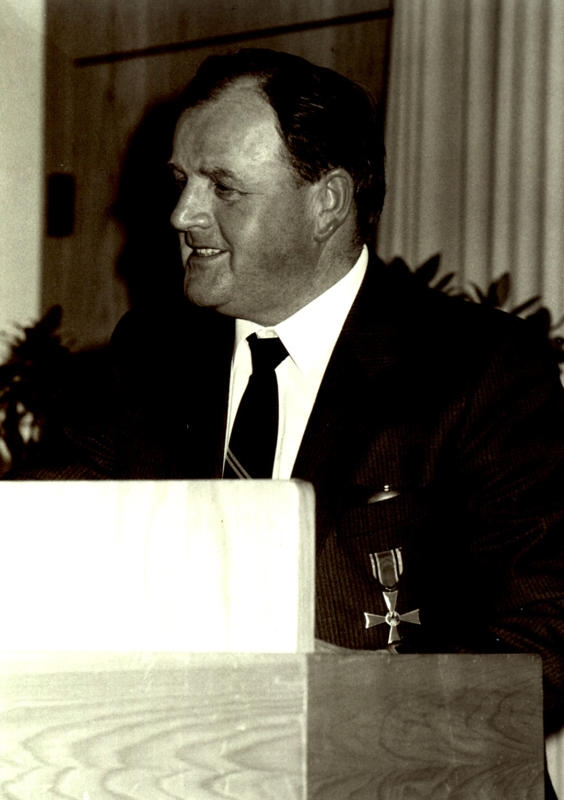
- Schnitzler in 1983, receiving the Order of Merit of the Federal Republic of Germany

Personal details
- Born: 16 December 1928 St. Johann (Reutlingen), Germany
- Died: 15 July 2011 (aged 82) St. Johann (Reutlingen), Germany
- Party: Christian Democratic Union
- Occupation: Politician, manager

Friedrich "Fritz" Wilhelm Schnitzler (16 December 1928 – 15 July 2011) was a German landowner and business manager, and also a local politician of the Christian Democratic Union (CDU), the founder of the agricultural association of the District of Reutlingen and co-founder of the landholders' association of Baden-Württemberg, and lobbyist in the state parliament.

== Life and career ==
Schnitzler was born in Ohnastetten, now part of St. Johann, in the district of Reutlingen. He had a diploma in agricultural management and was a certified assessor of wildlife damage. While managing his property part-time, from October 1962 to December 1974 he was a district councillor and deputy mayor in Ohnastetten and also served as a lay judge in the state court at Tübingen. After Ohnastetten was incorporated into St. Johann, he served from 1975 to 1996 as its district representative and a member of the councils there and in St. Johann.

In January 1962 he was elected president of the then agricultural association of Reutlingen and in 1975 he united it with its counterpart in Münsingen to form the agricultural association of the District of Reutlingen (Kreisbauernverband Reutlingen e.V). He served as its chairman (Kreisobmann) from 1975 to 1992. During this time he also co-founded the landholders' association of Baden-Württemberg (Landesbauernverband in Baden-Württemberg) and became its first lobbyist in the state parliament. He worked in close association with the Minister-president, Lothar Späth; the Minister of Agriculture, Gerhard Weiser; the Minister of the Environment Hermann Schaufler; the first president of the landholders' association, Ernst Geprägs; and the Baden-Württemberg state Ministry of agricultural land and the protection of land-use (Ministerium für Ländlichen Raum und Verbraucherschutz Baden-Württemberg).

Schnitzler was the first representative of agriculture for the entire District of Reutlingen, and from 1992 until his death in 2011, was honorary chairman of the district agricultural association and a docent at the "Swabian Farmers' School" in Bad Waldsee. He played an important role in founding both the women's agricultural association of Reutlingen and the women's choir.

Schnitzler's political and lobbying efforts focussed for the most part on farming, in particular dairy farming and milk processing. He introduced changes that aroused much discussion throughout the country. He introduced an annual meeting of the agricultural association in St. Johann on Presentation Day, 2 February.

He was also a business manager in dairy: he was assistant manager of the Reutlingen dairy plant and chairman of the board of the local dairy producers' association; he continued to advise it as honorary chairman until his death. He also served as both chairman of both the supervisory board and Vorstand of Südmilch AG, Germany's largest milk producer, after a financial scandal in the early 1990s; he was able to overcome the problems and the company was subsequently sold to what is now FrieslandCampina and became Campina GmbH.

== Personal life ==
Schnitzler and his wife Anne-Marie lived on a 30 hectares (74 acres) dairy farm in Ohnastetten with their son Frank Christoph.

== Honours ==
- 1984 Order of Merit on ribbon (Verdienstkreuz am Bande) of the Order of Merit of the Federal Republic of Germany
- 1992–2011 Honorary chairman, Agricultural Association of the District of Reutlingen
- 1996–2011 Honorary chairman, Association of Milk Producers of Reutlingen
