= St. Johann (Reutlingen) =

- Municipality
- Flag Coat of arms

- Location of St. Johann within Reutlingen district
- Interactive map of St. Johann
- Location within Germany Location within Baden-Württemberg
- Coordinates: 48°27′10″N 09°20′35″E
- Country: Germany
- State: Baden-Württemberg
- Admin. region: Tübingen
- District: Reutlingen
- Subdivisions: 6 Ortsteile

Government
  - Mayor (2023–31): Florian Bauer

Area
  - Total: 58.92 km^{2} (22.75 sq mi)
- Elevation: 727 m (2,385 ft)

Population (2025-12-31)
  - Total: 5,188
  - Density: 88.05/km^{2} (228.1/sq mi)
- Time zone: UTC+01:00 (CET)
  - Summer (DST): UTC+02:00 (CEST)
- Postal codes: 72813
- Dialling codes: 07122
- Vehicle registration: RT
- Website: www.st-johann.de

St. Johann (German pronunciation: [zaŋkt ˈjoːhan]; sometimes spelled in full as Sankt Johann) is a municipality in the district of Reutlingen in Baden-Württemberg in Germany. The seat of the municipal administration is Würtingen. Large parts of the area (44.2%) of St. Johann are part of the UNESCO Biosphere Swabian Alb.

== Geography ==
=== Geographical location ===
The six districts of the municipality (Bleichstetten, Gächingen, Lonsingen, Ohnastetten, Upfingen and Würtingen) are scattered on the Alb plateau over a wide area.

St. Johann in Reutlingen district

=== Neighbouring communities ===
The following evidence cities and municipalities are adjacent to the municipality of St. Johann. They are starting called in clockwise in the north and part of the district of Reutlingen:

Dettingen an der Erms, Bad Urach, Münsingen, Gomadingen, Engstingen, Lichtenstein, Pfullingen, Eningen and Metzingen.

=== Constituent communities ===
The community consists of the parts of the municipality and formerly independent municipalities Bleichstetten, Gächingen, Lonsingen, Ohnastetten, Upfingen and Würtingen. To the municipality parts Bleichstetten, Lonsingen, Ohnastetten and Upfingen only belong the villages of the same name. The municipal part Gächingen includes the village Gächingen, the farm and the house Birkenhof Tiefental and municipality part Würtingen includes the village Würtingen and the courtyards Fohlenhof and St. Johann.

== History ==
The districts Upfingen, Ohnastetten and Würtingen were first mentioned in 1138 in a document of the Zwiefalten Abbey. Bleichstetten was recorded in 1102, Lonsingen in 1268 and Gächingen in 1275. On February 1, 1972, Bleichstetten was incorporated to Würtingen. On 1 January 1975, the municipalities Gächingen, Lonsingen, Ohnastetten, Würtingen and Upfingen were merged to form the new municipality Würtingen. The new church was renamed after Gestütshof St. Johann on September 1, 1976.

== Würtingen ==
The old Heeresweg led by Gächingen ago by Degental between Würtingen and Ohnastetten down to Eningen. In the Thirty Years' War and subsequent War of succession, earthworks were piled up for defense.

Würtingen belonged to the House of Urach and fell with that to the House of Württemberg.

In the German Peasants' War Singerhans from Würtingen and Konrad Griesinger from Bleichstetten searched to join Poor Conrad. On May 17, 1514, they were on the way, and taken by the ranger from Urach. Griesinger escaped injured. Later he was together with Bantelhans imprisoned on the Hohenneuffen.

In the Thirty Years' War Würtingen was taken hard; in 1636 raged the famine, and soon after that the plague. From formerly 370 residents only 58 survived the war.

From 1640 to 1648, 30 towns who belonged to Urach- including Würtingen, Ohnastetten and Bleichstetten - went to the county Achalm and were incorporated to Further Austria. With the Peace of Westphalia the rule Achalm fell back to Württemberg.

== Mayor ==
The mayor is elected for a term of 8 years. On February 8, 2015, Florian Bauer was elected with 51.11% of the votes in the second ballot.

- 1972-1999: Raimund Speidel
- 1999-2015: Eberhard Wolf
- Since 2015: Florian Bauer (FDP)

== Arms ==
Blazon: In blue a rising silver Ross before a cut ear golden awns.

== Twinning ==
St. Johann has since October 30, 1999, a partnership with the French community of the municipality of Thénezay.

== Music ==
The Gächinger Kantorei was founded in 1954 by Helmuth Rilling; today it has its seat in Stuttgart.

== Buildings ==
- Town Hall in Würtingen, timber-framed building from 1744
- Evangelical Church Andreas in Würtingen
- Lookout on the Hohewarte

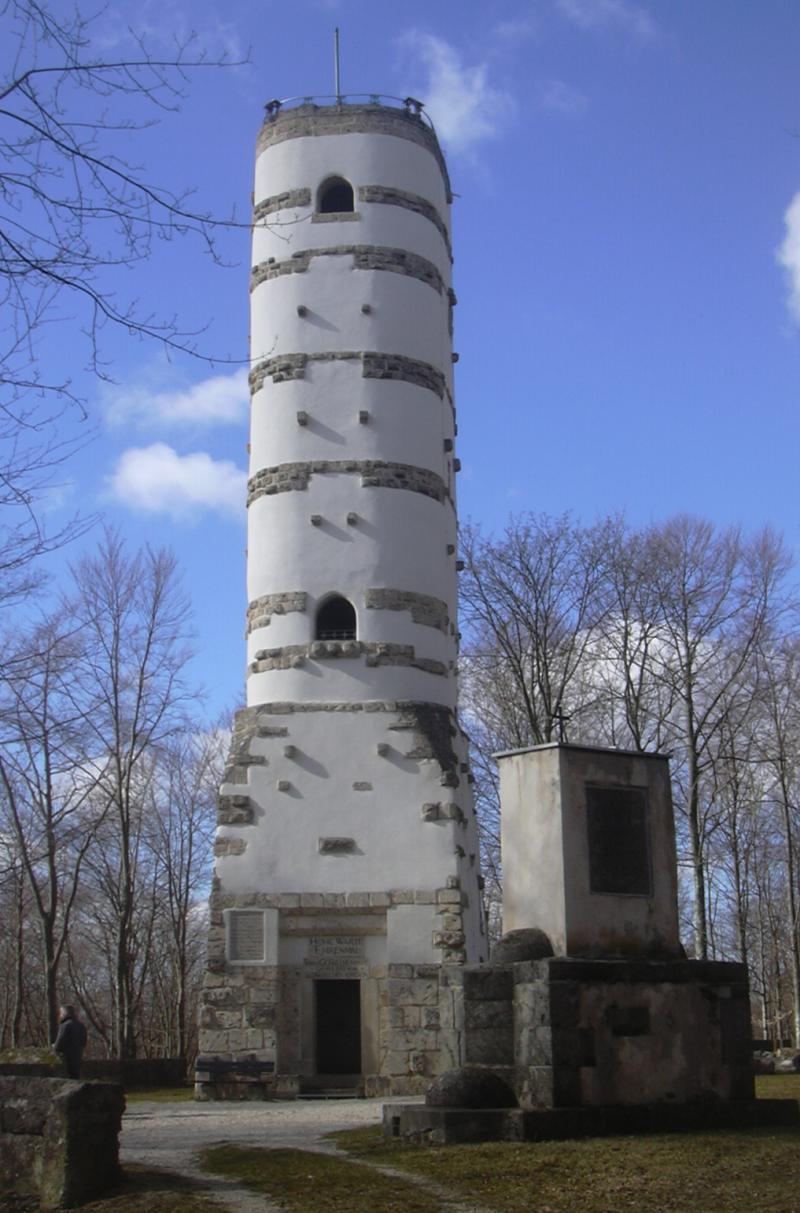
HoheWarte Watch tower

- Late Gothic Wehrkirche St. Georg in Gächingen
- Late Gothic Marienkirche in Upfingen
- Evangelical Pankratiuskirche with black shale - tower in Ohnastetten
- Ross fountain in Lonsingen

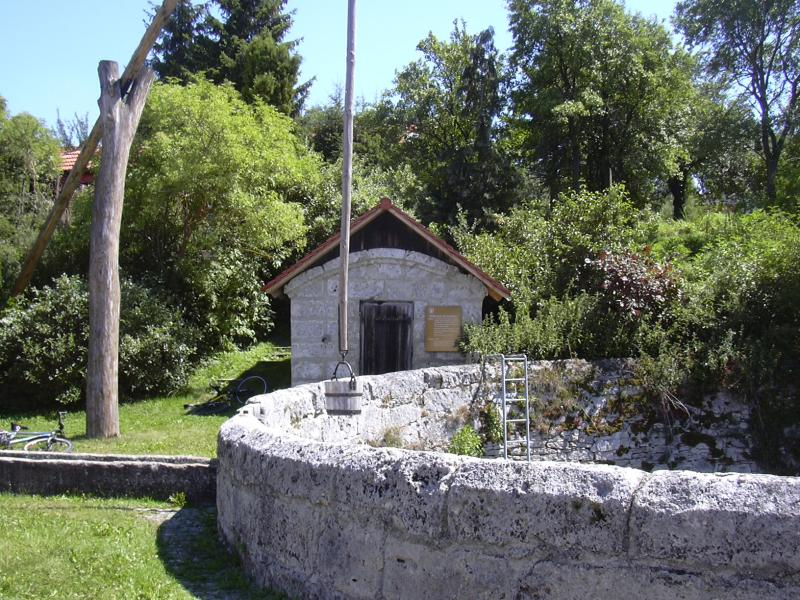
Lonsingen Fountain

- Grain Mill in Würtingen (was demolished 2010)

== Teams ==
The evangelical German pioneer Indian Mission was founded in 1962 and has its headquarter in Lonsingen.

== Economy and infrastructure ==
Here is a biogas plant within the boundaries of Upfingen.

== Traffic ==
The National Road 380 connects Gächingen, Lonsingen and Würtingen to the north with Reutlingen. The L 249 connects Lonsingen and Upfingen with Bad Urach. The districts are interconnected via county roads.

The public transport is guaranteed by the Verkehrsverbund Neckar-Alb-Donau (NALDO). The community is located in the comb 221.

== Public Institutions ==
The Gestütshof St. Johann is a domain of Marbach stud. There horses are kept since the 17th century. The stud gave the community its name.

== Education ==
- School St. Johann
- Neighborhood elementary school Lonsingen
- Primary and Secondary School with Werkrealschule Würtingen

== Personality ==
=== Freemen ===
- Honorary citizen of Würtingen:
- Stephan Haid (1874-1932), born in Würtingen, senior teacher and organist,
- Honorary citizens of St. Johann:
- Helmuth Rilling, (born 1933), founder, conductor and director of the Gächinger Kantorei and International Bach Academy in Stuttgart
- Mayor Raimund Speidel (Official period 1972 to 1999)

=== Sons and daughters of the town ===
- Johann Georg Hegel, (1615-1680), born in Würtingen, Lutheran pastor, the progenitor of the "respectable" Hegel family in Württemberg
- Eberhard Friedrich Hiemer (1682-1727), Lutheran theologian
- Lothar Schall (1924-1996), born in Stuttgart, painter, entertained from 1973 a studio in Gächingen.
- Friedrich Wilhelm "Fritz" Schnitzler (1928-2011) was born in Ohnastetten, was a German farmer, politician of the CDU, business managers and farmers' union functionary.

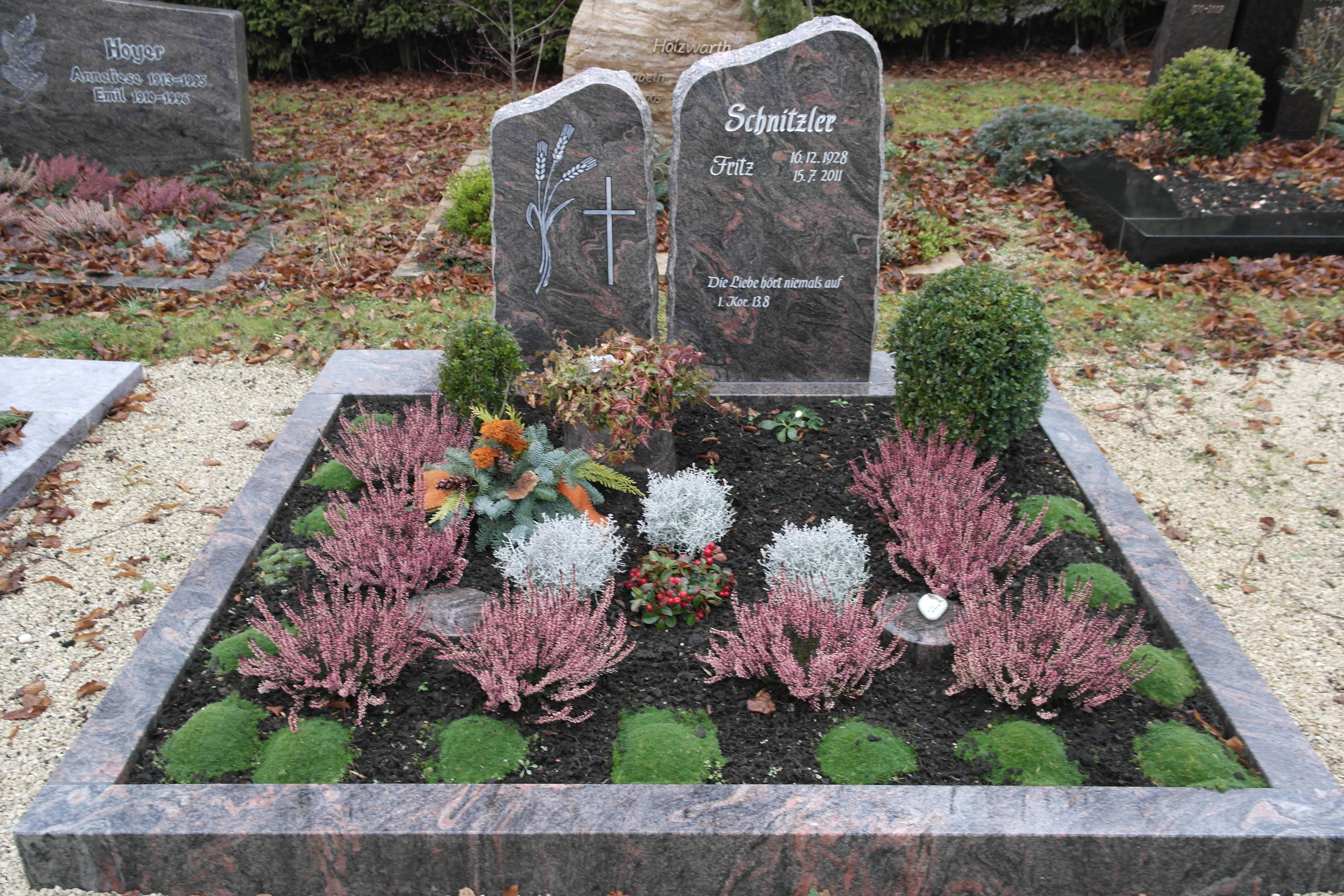
Grave Friedrich Wilhelm Schnitzler - Cemetery Ohnastetten
