= Reinhard Breymayer =

Reinhard Breymayer (4 January 1944 – 13 August 2017) was a German philologist, researcher into pietism and specialist on the history of rhetoric. His published output is considerable.

== Life ==
=== Early years ===
Breymayer was born in Urach, a small town in the hilly countryside between Stuttgart and Ulm. He grew up in nearby Unterweissach and Hülben, and attended the Evangelical Seminaries of Maulbronn and Blaubeuren. These were secondary schools with an unusually intensive focus on classical and humanistic education. He passed his school leaving exams (Abitur) in 1963, which opened the way to university level education. He studied successively at the universities of Tübingen, Cologne, Bonn and Bochum. Between 1964 and 1967 he was supported in a philology scholarship from the Evangelical "Stift" of Tübingen, a prestigious (protestant) seminary. He received his Magister ("Master of Arts") degree from the University of Bonn in 1971, reflecting his studies in Germanistics, Indogerman and Slavonic language sciences and General Rhetoric.

=== Professional years ===
After his studies he worked at the universities of Bonn, Heidelberg and Stuttgart, along with the Pedagogical College Heidelberg and Schwäbisch Gmünd. He also worked for the Regional Archives in Stuttgart and as a researcher in Berlin at the Historical Commission for Research into Pietism. Since 1989 he has held a contract for teaching General Rhetoric at the Eberhard-Karl's University of Tübingen, and since 1996 he has been "Germany correspondent" for the Thessaloniki based ADAMAS Götz Hübner Intercultural Studies Foundation in Schorndorf. Between 1971 and 1976 he was one of the producers of the journal Linguistica Biblica (Bonn), also in 1972 involved as co-publisher of volumes 1 and 3 in the series Forum Theologiae Linguisticae. Interdisziplinäre Schriftenreihe für Theologie und Linguistik. Between 1982 and 2000 he was part of the editorial committee for the journal Aries (Paris-Sorbonne). In 1992 he became a producer of the annual news journal Suevica. In total, Breymayer has authored more than 200 published works, concentrating on pietism, rhetoric and German-language philology.

In later years he also worked in the history of philosophy. In particularly, he actively supported the German Diderot researcher Werner Raupp as a translator and bibliographer, especially in the publication of the international Memorial: Denis Diderot zum 300. Geburtstag (2013).
