= Wilhelm Zimmermann =

German theologian and historian (1807–1878)

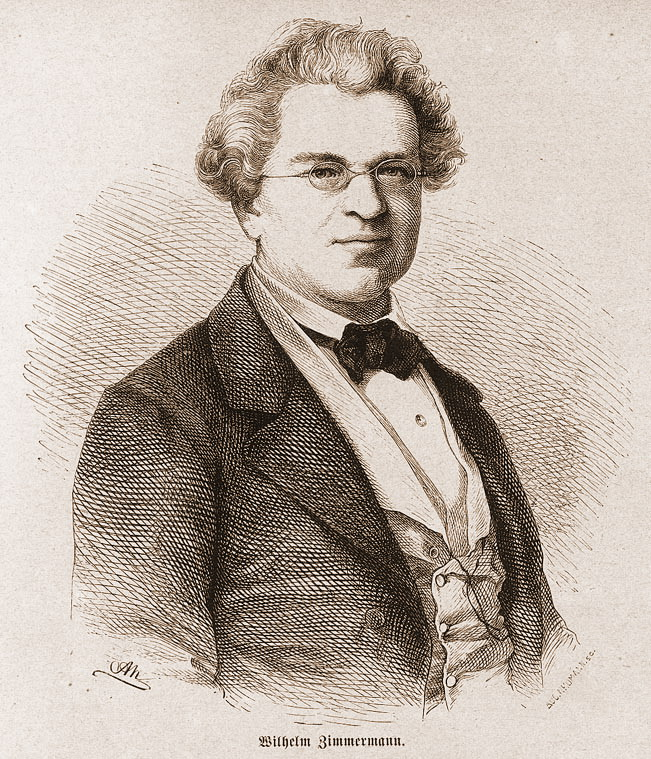
- Zimmermann in 1869
- Born: 2 January 1807; Stuttgart
- Died: 22 September 1878 (aged 71); Mergentheim
- Occupations: Theologian, writer

Wilhelm Zimmermann (2 January 1807 in Stuttgart – 22 September 1878 in Mergentheim) was a German theologian and historian. Zimmermann has been described as a "founding father of German vegetarianism".

== Biography ==
He studied at the Tübinger Stift in Tübingen, and from 1840 to 1847 served as an assistant pastor in Dettingen an der Erms and as a pastor in Hülben. From 1847 to 1850, Zimmermann taught history at the Oberrealschule in Stuttgart. He was a democrat in philosophy and belief. Accordingly, he took part in the revolutionary uprising in Germany in 1848 through 1849. In 1848, he was elected as a deputy to the Frankfurt National Assembly. At assembly, he caucused with the "Left wing" deputies. In 1850, Zimmermann was dismissed from his position as a teacher at the Oberrealschule because of his participation in the revolution of 1848-1849 and because of his caucusing with the Left wing in the Frankfurt Assembly. Zimmermann died in 1878.

From 1841 to 1843, he published the 3-volume Allgemeine Geschichte des großen Bauernkrieges (General History of the Great Peasant War).

== Vegetarianism ==
Zimmermann became a vegetarian in 1839 and lived at Alcott House, a vegetarian and utopian socialist community in 1840. In 1843, he authored the book Der Weg zum Paradies ("The Way to Paradise"). The book argued that Europe had fallen in moral and physical decline because people had broken the "laws of nature" by consuming meat, overdressing and treating disease with poisons. To reverse the process, Zimmermann recommended people to "return to nature" by eating natural plant foods. The book introduced German readers to ancient and modern vegetarian literature. It sold well and went through four editions by the end of the century.

== Selected publications ==
- Allgemeine Geschichte des großen Bauernkrieges (1841–1843)
- Der Weg zum Paradies (1843, 1846)
- Die englische Revolution (1851)
