= Gutsbezirk Münsingen =

- Unincorporated area
- Location of Gutsbezirk Münsingen within Reutlingen district
- Interactive map of Gutsbezirk Münsingen
- Location within Germany Location within Baden-Württemberg
- Coordinates: 48°25′N 9°32′E
- Country: Germany
- State: Baden-Württemberg
- Admin. region: Tübingen
- District: Reutlingen

Area
  - Total: 64.63 km^{2} (24.95 sq mi)

Population (2025-12-31)
  - Total: 0
  - Density: 0.0/km^{2} (0.0/sq mi)
- Time zone: UTC+01:00 (CET)
  - Summer (DST): UTC+02:00 (CEST)

Gutsbezirk Münsingen (German pronunciation: [ˈɡuːtsbəˌtsɪʁk ˈmʏnzɪŋən]) is an unincorporated area in the German district of Reutlingen. It is located in the Swabian Jura (Baden-Württemberg).
