= Hayingen =

- Town
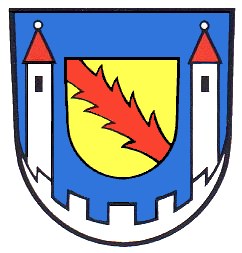
- Coat of arms

- Location of Hayingen within Reutlingen district
- Interactive map of Hayingen
- Location within Germany Location within Baden-Württemberg
- Coordinates: 48°16′31″N 09°28′41″E
- Country: Germany
- State: Baden-Württemberg
- Admin. region: Tübingen
- District: Reutlingen
- Subdivisions: 5 Stadtteile

Government
  - Mayor (2022–30): Ulrike Holzbrecher

Area
  - Total: 63.36 km^{2} (24.46 sq mi)
- Elevation: 661 m (2,169 ft)

Population (2025-12-31)
  - Total: 2,203
  - Density: 34.77/km^{2} (90.05/sq mi)
- Time zone: UTC+01:00 (CET)
  - Summer (DST): UTC+02:00 (CEST)
- Postal codes: 72534
- Dialling codes: 07386
- Vehicle registration: RT
- Website: www.hayingen.de

Hayingen (German pronunciation: [ˈhaɪɪŋən]; Swabian: Hoigna) is a town in the district of Reutlingen, in Baden-Württemberg, Germany. It is situated 32 km southeast of Reutlingen. North of Münzdorf are the remains of the hilltop castle Burgweiler.

== History ==
The first settlement in the area of Hayingen is attested by Hallstatt tombs dated to around 600 BC. At the turn of the third century AD, following periods of Celtic and Roman control, the region was overrun by the Alemanni, who gave the current city its name based on the personal name 'Heigo'. In 496, the Alemanni were defeated by the Franks and Hayingen became part of the Frankish Empire.

The settlement was mentioned as 'Hayinger Mark' in a 785 land exchange recorded in the Lorsch codex, with local monasteries owning property rights in the following century. The Knight Swigger von Gundelfingen probably founded the city in 1247, immortalized in Hayingen's coat of arms with the red-and-yellow Gundelfingen arms. The city received market rights with four annual markets and was subsequently expanded and fortified. It continued to develop into an important regional crafts center, particularly distinguished by its organ makers. In 1546 it came to the house of Helfenstein and in 1676 to the house of Fürstenberg.

Because of the Reichsdeputationshauptschluss Hayingen was mediatized from the Principality of Fürstenberg to the Kingdom of Württemberg in 1806. There, the city belonged to the Upper Office of Münsingen and later the District of Münsingen. After the 1973 Bavarian regional reform it was annexed to the District of Reutlingen.
