= Riederich =

- Municipality
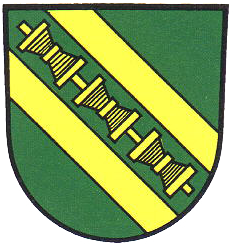
- Coat of arms

- Location of Riederich within Reutlingen district
- Interactive map of Riederich
- Location within Germany Location within Baden-Württemberg
- Coordinates: 48°33′37″N 09°16′02″E
- Country: Germany
- State: Baden-Württemberg
- Admin. region: Tübingen
- District: Reutlingen

Government
  - Mayor (2020–28): Tobias Pokrop

Area
  - Total: 4.64 km^{2} (1.79 sq mi)
- Elevation: 336 m (1,102 ft)

Population (2025-12-31)
  - Total: 4,247
  - Density: 915/km^{2} (2,370/sq mi)
- Time zone: UTC+01:00 (CET)
  - Summer (DST): UTC+02:00 (CEST)
- Postal codes: 72585
- Dialling codes: 07123
- Vehicle registration: RT
- Website: www.riederich.de

Riederich (German pronunciation: [ˈʁiːdəʁɪç]) is a municipality in the district of Reutlingen in Baden-Württemberg in Germany. It is about 30 km away from Stuttgart and has a population of 4300.
