= Hohenstein (Reutlingen) =

- Municipality
- Coat of arms

- Location of Hohenstein within Reutlingen district
- Interactive map of Hohenstein
- Location within Germany Location within Baden-Württemberg
- Coordinates: 48°20′52″N 09°22′22″E
- Country: Germany
- State: Baden-Württemberg
- Admin. region: Tübingen
- District: Reutlingen
- Subdivisions: 5 Ortsteile

Government
  - Mayor (2015–23): Jochen Zeller

Area
  - Total: 61.68 km^{2} (23.81 sq mi)
- Elevation: 741 m (2,431 ft)

Population (2025-12-31)
  - Total: 3,782
  - Density: 61.32/km^{2} (158.8/sq mi)
- Time zone: UTC+01:00 (CET)
  - Summer (DST): UTC+02:00 (CEST)
- Postal codes: 72531
- Dialling codes: 07387
- Vehicle registration: RT
- Website: www.gemeinde-hohenstein.de

Hohenstein (German pronunciation: [ˈhoːənˌʃtaɪn]) is a town in the district of Reutlingen in Baden-Württemberg in Germany.
