= Pfronstetten =

- Municipality
- Coat of arms

- Location of Pfronstetten within Reutlingen district
- Interactive map of Pfronstetten
- Location within Germany Location within Baden-Württemberg
- Coordinates: 48°16′35″N 09°21′41″E
- Country: Germany
- State: Baden-Württemberg
- Admin. region: Tübingen
- District: Reutlingen
- Subdivisions: 6 Ortsteile

Government
  - Mayor (2016–24): Reinhold Teufel

Area
  - Total: 54.10 km^{2} (20.89 sq mi)
- Elevation: 748 m (2,454 ft)

Population (2025-12-31)
  - Total: 1,538
  - Density: 28.43/km^{2} (73.63/sq mi)
- Time zone: UTC+01:00 (CET)
  - Summer (DST): UTC+02:00 (CEST)
- Postal codes: 72539
- Dialling codes: 07388 und 07373
- Vehicle registration: RT
- Website: www.pfronstetten.de

Pfronstetten is a town in the district of Reutlingen in Baden-Württemberg in Germany.

== Geography ==
=== Geographical location ===
Pfronstetten is located in the Swabian Alb, about 25 km south of Reutlingen.

=== Neighboring municipalities ===
The following towns and municipalities border on the municipality of Pfronstetten, they are named clockwise starting in the north and belong to the district of Reutlingen or the districts of Biberach¹ and Sigmaringen.

=== Municipal division ===
A total of seven villages and farms belong to the municipality of Pfronstetten with the municipalities of Aichelau, Aichstetten, Geisingen, Huldstetten and Tigerfeld, which were independent until the municipal area reform in Baden-Württemberg. Only the villages of the same name belong to the municipal districts of Aichelau, Aichstetten, Geisingen, Huldstetten and Pfronstetten. The village of Tigerfeld and the St. Georgenhof farm belong to the district of Tigerfeld.

There are several abandoned villages in the municipality: The two villages of Höfle and Niklausenweiler in the Aichelau district. Niklausenweiler was built as a brickworks at the end of the 18th century, but did not exist for long; the village was named after Abbot Nikolaus von Zwiefalten. The deserted villages of Hendelheim or Hendenheim - the village was mentioned in 1352 as Hendenhain, the place name is still preserved as a field name -, Schäfbuch - the village was mentioned in the 11th and 12th centuries as Schefbuoch and Scepbouch - and Wolfriedeshalden, which was mentioned in the 11th century as Wolfridushaldun, are located in the district of Pfronstetten.
