= Grafenberg (Reutlingen) =

- Municipality
- Coat of arms

- Location of Grafenberg within Reutlingen district
- Interactive map of Grafenberg
- Location within Germany Location within Baden-Württemberg
- Coordinates: 48°33′59″N 9°18′22″E
- Country: Germany
- State: Baden-Württemberg
- Admin. region: Tübingen
- District: Reutlingen

Government
  - Mayor (2019–27): Volker Brodberg

Area
  - Total: 3.51 km^{2} (1.36 sq mi)
- Elevation: 422 m (1,385 ft)

Population (2025-12-31)
  - Total: 2,649
  - Density: 755/km^{2} (1,950/sq mi)
- Time zone: UTC+01:00 (CET)
  - Summer (DST): UTC+02:00 (CEST)
- Postal codes: 72661
- Dialling codes: 07123
- Vehicle registration: RT
- Website: www.grafenberg.de

Grafenberg is a municipality in the district of Reutlingen in Baden-Württemberg in Germany.
