= Römerstein =

- Municipality
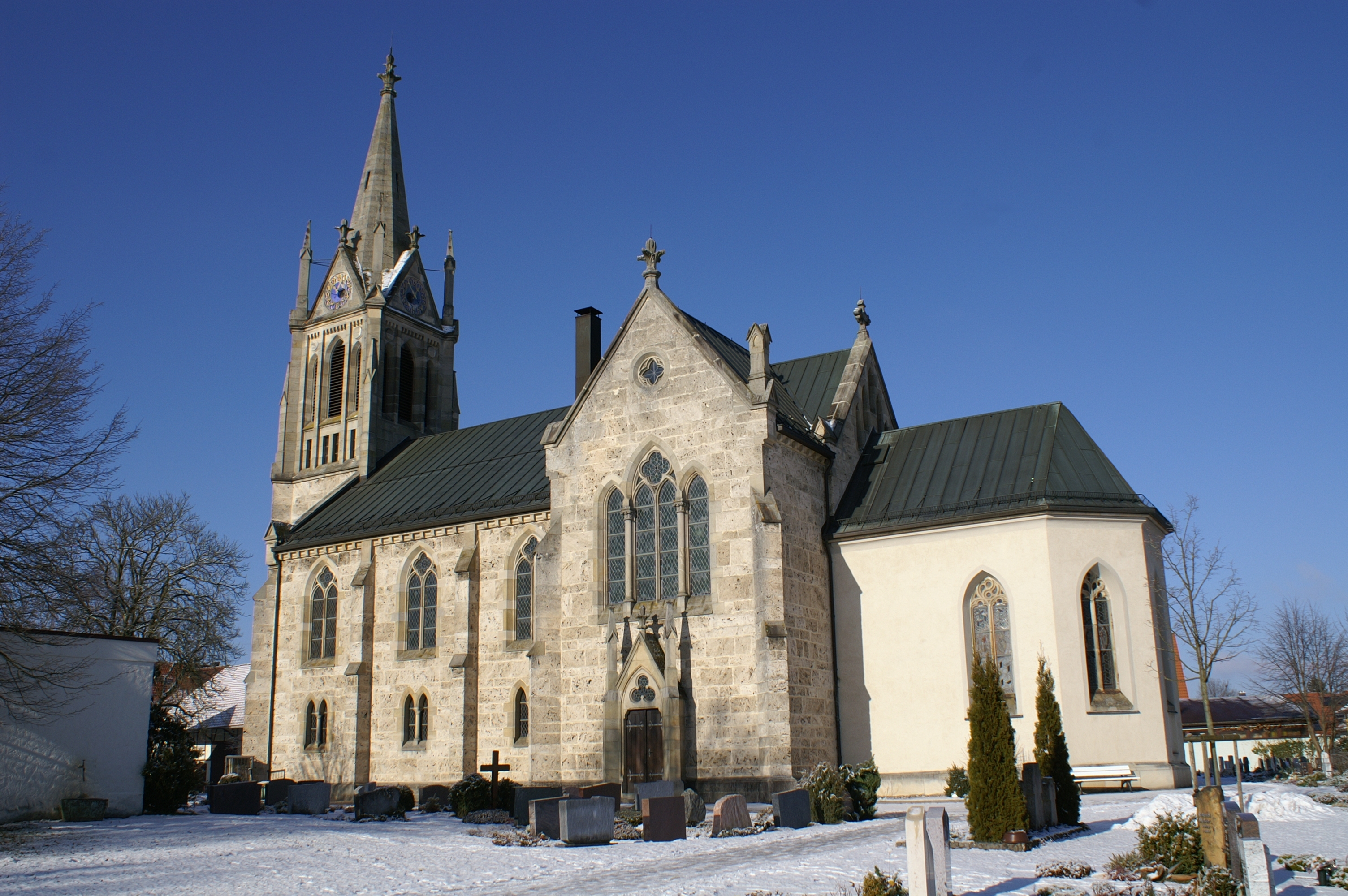
- Saint Gallus Church

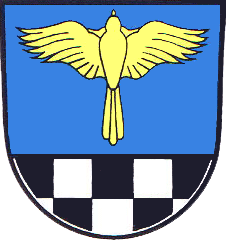
- Coat of arms

- Location of Römerstein within Reutlingen district
- Interactive map of Römerstein
- Location within Germany Location within Baden-Württemberg
- Coordinates: 48°29′44″N 09°30′38″E
- Country: Germany
- State: Baden-Württemberg
- Admin. region: Tübingen
- District: Reutlingen
- Subdivisions: 3 Ortsteile

Government
  - Mayor (2022–30): Anja Sauer

Area
  - Total: 46.05 km^{2} (17.78 sq mi)
- Elevation: 757 m (2,484 ft)

Population (2025-12-31)
  - Total: 4,120
  - Density: 89.5/km^{2} (232/sq mi)
- Time zone: UTC+01:00 (CET)
  - Summer (DST): UTC+02:00 (CEST)
- Postal codes: 72587
- Dialling codes: 07382
- Vehicle registration: RT
- Website: www.roemerstein.de

Römerstein is a municipality in Baden-Württemberg, Germany; three formerly independent villages (Böhringen, Donnstetten, Zainingen) and two hamlets (Strohweiler and Aglishardt) were merged in 1975. Administration seat is Böhringen.

The community is located on the Swabian Alb, in the northeastern corner of the district of Reutlingen. The community is named after the Römerstein, the highest hill of the region at 875 m.

== Geography ==
The municipality is located about 22 kilometers east of Reutlingen on the plateau of the Swabian Alb at an altitude of 803 m above sea level. NN (Rathaus Donnstetten). Römerstein reaches an elevation of 874 m above sea level at its highest point.

The municipality is bordered by Lenningen (Esslingen district) Wiesensteig (Göppingen District), Westerheim, Laichingen (both Alb-Donau-Kreis), Gutsbezirk Münsingen, Bad Urach and grave Stetten (all district Reutlingen).

== Municipality arrangement ==
The community consists of the previously independent municipalities Böhringen, Donnstetten and Zainingen. The former municipalities Donnstetten and Zainingen today form localities within the definition of Baden-Württemberg municipal code with independent local councils and mayors. Böhringen includes the village of Böhringen, the hamlet of Strohweiler, and the homestead Aglishardt. Donnstetten includes the village of Donnstetten and the Haus Römersteinhäuser, an observation tower erected in 1912 on the Römerstein. Zainingen consists only the village of the same name.

In the municipality of Römerstein are several traces of former places which no longer exist; in the territory of the village Böhringen the 1487 as Fischenhusen, and probably in Aglishardt Fischhausen, zu dem Gaiswyler mentioned in 1454, Gölenbrunnen, Hofen, two places mentioned in 1275: Ichenhusen and Horgenloch, Katzensteig, mentioned around 1192 as Cazcensteige, Oberwiler mentioned in 1454 as Oberweiler, Vohenhausen mentioned in 1345 as uf Vohenhusen, and Zimmerbuch, mentioned in 1204 as Zimberbuch and in 1299 as Zymberbuch. In the territory of the village Donnstetten are the two deserted villages of Beuren, attested by a toponym, and Roter Hof

== History ==
Presumably the settlement was in the Roman settlement back Clarenna. The identification of the Roman town Clarenna which is passed down through the Peutingertafel is, with the archaeological finds in Donnstetten very likely, but not absolutely certain. Main article: Castle Donnstetten The municipality Römerstein originated during the Baden-Württemberg district reform on 1 January 1975 as a merger of the formerly independent municipalities Böhringen (with thatched hamlets and Aglishardt) Donnstetten and Zainingen. The entire current community area was formerly part of the district of Münsingen and came with its resolution 1973 the district of Reutlingen . Coat of Böhringen

=== Böhringen ===
Böhringen was 1090 documentary mentioned for the first time together with the Hofgut Aglishardt. The place was originally part of Kirchheimer hundred . About the Men of Sperbereck Böhringen came in the 15th century to Württemberg . In the Thirty Years' War the city was almost completely destroyed. In World War II there was in the last days of the war heavy destruction. Coat of Donnstetten

=== Donnstetten ===
Already in the year 776 Donnstetten was in a document of Lorsch called Tunnesstate. 1603 it became part of Württemberg . Coat of Zainingen

=== Zainingen ===
Zainingen was first 788 as "Zeininger" marca in Lorsch codex mentioned. 1383 was the place to Württemberg .

== Religions ==
The St. George's Church in Donnstetten district. Already in 1192 the St. Gallus Church in Böhringen mentioned. The church was first mentioned in Zainingen 1275th Donnstetten which previously belonged ecclesiastically to Zainingen, since 1447 has the status of a separate parish. Since the introduction of the Reformation, the places are Lutheran coined. In Römerstein Today there are three Protestant churches, the Protestant parish Böhringen with St. Gallus Church, the Protestant parish Zainingen with Martin Church and the Protestant church Donnstetten-Westerheim with the St. George's Church. The members of the United Methodist Church gather in Laichingen, while the Catholics of the parish of St. Joseph are assigned in Bad Urach.

== Politics ==
The administrative center is Böhringen, local administrative bodies are in Donnstetten and Zainingen.

=== Council ===
The council Römerstein has 14 members. The local elections on 25 May 2014 led to the following official results. The turnout was 64.4% (2009: 65.8%). The council consists of the elected honorary councilors and the mayor as chairman. The mayor is entitled to vote in the municipal council.

- Free Bürgerliste Römerstein 45.3% 6 seats (2009: 55.7%, 8 seats)
- Independent Citizens List Römerstein 54.7% 8 seats (2009: 44.3%, 6 seats)

=== Mayor ===
The mayor is elected for a term of eight years.

- 1975-1999: Hans Sigel
- 1999-2013: Michael Donth
- 2013–2022: Matthias Winter
- 2022–incumbent: Anja Sauer

=== Crest ===
Blazon : "About a double row of black and silver geschachten sign foot in Blue a flying upwards golden hawk."

== Museums ==
In Donnstetten is a local history museum in the parish barn.

== Associations ==
- German Red Cross, the local association Römerstein: Founded in 1976 as a result of local government reform from the three DRC -Ortsgruppen Böhringen, Donnstetten and Zainingen.
- Swabian Albverein e.V., local group Zainingen: Founded in 1949 in Zainingen

== Music ==
- Accordion and Concertina Club Römerstein e. V., founded in 1951 in *Donnstetten
- Vocal Group "Frohsinn" Böhringen Founded in 1887
- Liederkranz Donnstetten founded 1843
- Musikverein Zainingen e. V. founded in 1920
- Musikverein "harmony" Donnstetten, founded in 1895 as a mouth Erich's Chapel

== Sports ==
- Sportfreunde Donnstetten founded, April 3, 1948
- Sportverein Zainingen, founded March 14, 1926
- TSV Böhringen founded in 1919
- FC Römerstein founded 2005

== Buildings ==
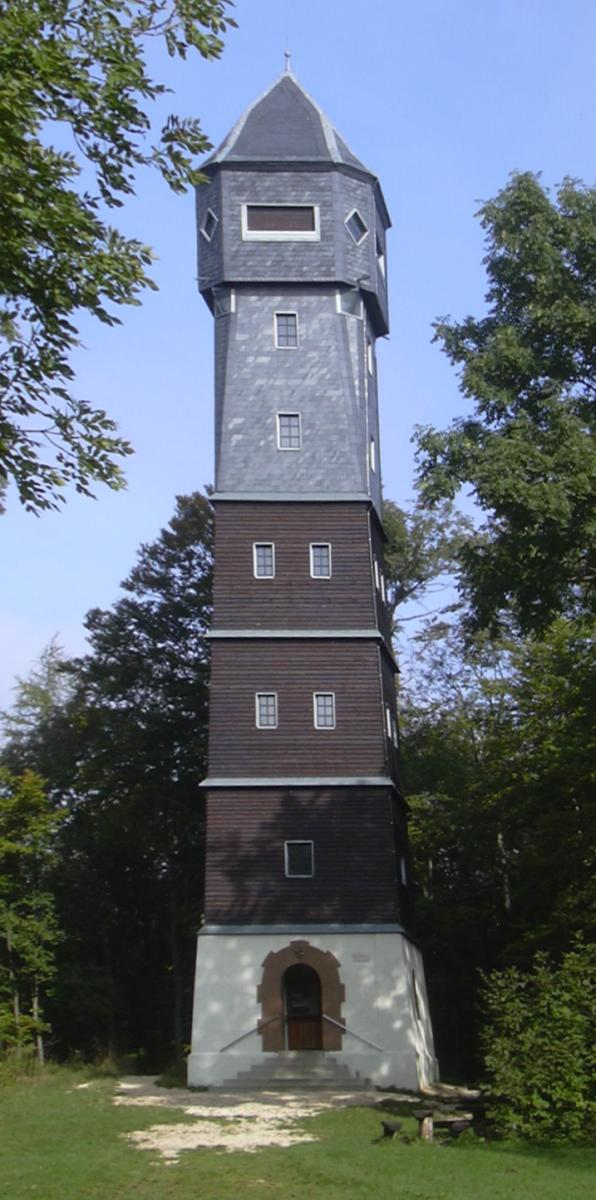
Römersteinturm

- The St. Gallus Church in Böhringen was built in neo-Gothic style in the years 1885–86, the choir dates from 1498th
- The Church of St. George in Donnstetten was built in the 15th century.
- St Martin's Church in Zainingen. The foundation year is not precisely known, but a stone in the wall behind the church organ records that it was in place by 1494. Noteworthy is the churchyard wall that was built in 1559. The church served both the population of Zainingen, as well as travelling merchants passing through the village on the route from Paris to Prague. A 15th century fresco of Saint Christopher, the patron saint of travellers, is still visible on the south wall.

=== Towers ===
- The 28 m high Römersteinturm is located on the 872 m high Römerstein three kilometers north and was emerged 1912.
- The 20 m high Waldgreutturm is two kilometers southeast of Zainingen. [3]
- The 42 m high tower is Hursch southwest of Zainingen. [4]

== Transportation ==
Römerstein is conveniently located on the main roads 28 and 465 ( Kirchheim unter Teck - Leutkirch im Allgäu ), which pass through the municipality. Public transport is by the Verkehrsverbund Neckar-Alb-Donau guaranteed (NALDO). The community is located in the comb 222nd

== Tourism ==
Winter sports in Römerstein is possible: Three ski lifts and six inter-related cross-country trails totaling over 50 kilometers in length make Römerstein a popular winter sports resort in the Swabian Alb. Römerstein has a bobsled, and Zainingen one reaches the Swabian Alb Biosphere Reserve in the former military training area Münsingen . In the center of Zainingen be one of the last original is obtained Hülen in the Swabian Alb. From the covered observation deck of the Roman stone tower a view in all four directions over medium Alb is possible.

== Education ==
The main school Römerstein in Böhringen and primary schools in Zainingen and Donnstetten there in Römerstein three schools. For the youngest inhabitants there is a municipal and two Protestant kindergartens.

== Famous citizens ==
- Ludwig Friedrich Gifftheil (1595–1661), pacifist, religious writer, and a pioneer of early Pietism in the Netherlands
- "Knight Bauer" Georg Length (1898–1990), head of the pietistic community hour in Böhringen
