= Metzingen =

- Town
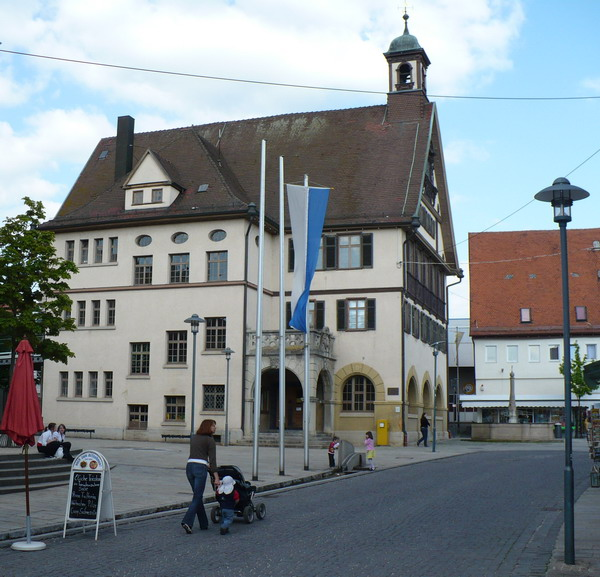
- Town hall of Metzingen

- Coat of arms

- Location of Metzingen within Reutlingen district
- Interactive map of Metzingen
- Location within Germany Location within Baden-Württemberg
- Coordinates: 48°32′12″N 09°17′09″E
- Country: Germany
- State: Baden-Württemberg
- Admin. region: Tübingen
- District: Reutlingen

Government
  - Mayor (2021–29): Carmen Haberstroh (Ind.)

Area
  - Total: 34.61 km^{2} (13.36 sq mi)
- Elevation: 350 m (1,150 ft)

Population (2025-12-31)
  - Total: 23,305
  - Density: 673.4/km^{2} (1,744/sq mi)
- Time zone: UTC+01:00 (CET)
  - Summer (DST): UTC+02:00 (CEST)
- Postal codes: 72541–72555
- Dialling codes: 07123
- Vehicle registration: RT
- Website: www.metzingen.de

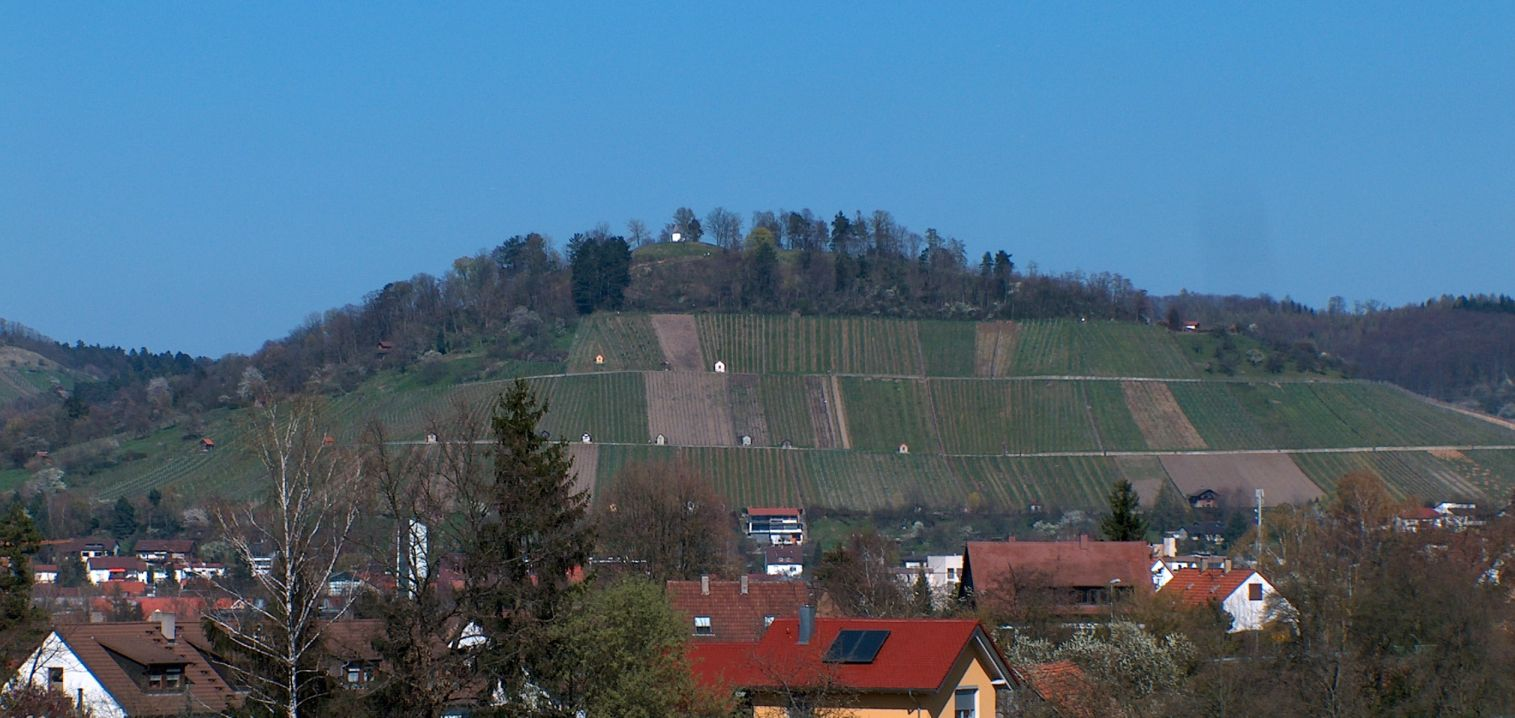
Metzingen Weinberg

Metzingen (German: [ˈmɛt͡sɪŋən]) is a Swabian city with about 22,000 inhabitants, in Reutlingen county, Baden-Württemberg, Germany, 30 km (19 mi) south of Stuttgart. The city of Metzingen is known internationally for its outlets of all kinds of famous companies, centered around Hugo Boss who was one of the first companies that opened a store back in the 1970s. The former quarter of textile factories which was changed to a quarter of outlets is called 'Outlet City', and people from all over the world come here for a shopping experience.

In a local context, Metzingen is known for its wine. In the center of the city there is a square with the biggest ensemble of wine pressing houses worldwide. In the entire municipality 11 wine pressing houses and two ancient wooden wine presses are preserved.

== Geography ==
The following towns and municipalities are on the borders of Metzingen, they are named starting in the north and belong to district Reutlingen and to district Esslingen: Riederich, Grafenberg, Kohlberg, Neuffen, Dettingen an der Erms, St. Johann, Eningen unter Achalm and Reutlingen.

== History ==
Metzingen was first mentioned in documents from 1075. The cultivation of wine led to a spread of wealth around 1600. From the early 1600s it was under the jurisdiction of Oberamt Urach. During the Thirty Years' War, Metzingen suffered considerable destruction, and two thirds of the population died in a plague epidemic soon after. From the 1800s Metzingen was under the joint jurisdictions of Urach and Schwarzwald county; and finally under the jurisdiction of just Schwarzwald county from the abolition of the Oberamt to the end of World War II, when it was reassigned to the jurisdiction of Reutlingen (district).

Following industrialization, different textile factories were built in Metzingen. In 1859, Metzingen was connected to the railline from Tübingen to Stuttgart.

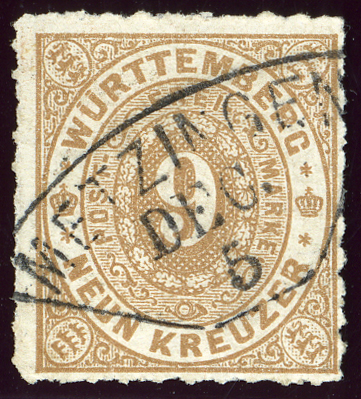
Metzingen in the Kingdom of Wurtemberg near 1873

== Neighbourhoods ==
Since the municipal reform in 1974 the city of Metzingen includes Neuhausen and Glems.

Glems has about 1,000 inhabitants and is located about 5 kilometers from the core city in a side valley of the Erm valley. Until the beginning of 20th century, Glems was predominantly agricultural. As of 2022, Glems still has some full-time farmers who guarantee sustainable landscape management and supply products from regional agriculture. Local shepherds contribute to the preservation of the cultural landscape of the Albtrauf, which are difficult to manage areas. Buildings from the 17th century such as the church, the town hall and the wine press have been preserved. Glems has renovated its town centre since 2000 and has an active village bakery and the Glemser Kelter is a listed building, used as a fruit tree museum, cider farm and community building. The pumped storage plant Glems (Tiefenbachtalsperre or Glemstalsperre) was built in 1962 to supply the region with electricity is located about 1.6 km southwest of the city of Metzingen.

== Mayors ==
- 1804–1822: Christian Friedrich Kuhorst
- 1822–1837: Georg Friedrich Gußmann
- 1837–1864: Jakob Michael Beck
- 1864–1878: Christian Hess
- 1878–1910: Friedrich Caspar
- 1910–1934: Wilhelm Carl
- 1934–1937: Ernst Neuhaus
- 1938–1946: Otto Dipper
- 1946–1949: Gottlob Prechtl
- 1949–1955: Willi Schmid
- 1955–1961: Otto Dipper
- 1961–1983: Eduard Kahl
- 1983–1999: Gotthard Herzig
- 1999–2008: Dieter Hauswirth
- 2009–2020: Dr. Ulrich Fiedler (born 1972)
- since 2021: Carmen Haberstroh

== Politics ==
The town council has 26 seats, of which the FWV has 9, the GREEN has 6m the CDU has 5, the FDP has 3, the SPD 1. 1 seat has a free cabndidate.

== International relations ==
Metzingen is twinned with:

- Hexham, United Kingdom
- Nagykálló, Hungary
- Noyon, France

== Economy ==
Hugo Boss was founded in Metzingen and still has its headquarters there. It started first with its factory outlet and was soon followed by other companies (e.g. Burberry, Reebok, JOOP!, Strenesse, Escada, Bally, Puma, Nike, Adidas, Tommy Hilfiger, etc.) who offer a range of their clothing at reduced prices. There are over 80 so-called "outlet-stores". Metzingen's factory outlets called Outletcity attract people from all over the country and Europe.

== Sport ==
The handball club TuS Metzingen won the DHB-Pokal in 2024.

== Notable people ==
- Hugo Boss (1885–1948), fashion designer
- Christian Friedrich Schönbein (1799–1868), German chemist
