= Dettingen an der Erms =

- Municipality
- Coat of arms

- Location of Dettingen an der Erms within Reutlingen district
- Interactive map of Dettingen an der Erms
- Location within Germany Location within Baden-Württemberg
- Coordinates: 48°31′48″N 09°20′50″E
- Country: Germany
- State: Baden-Württemberg
- Admin. region: Tübingen
- District: Reutlingen

Government
  - Mayor (2018–26): Michael Hillert

Area
  - Total: 15.79 km^{2} (6.10 sq mi)
- Elevation: 398 m (1,306 ft)

Population (2025-12-31)
  - Total: 10,018
  - Density: 634.5/km^{2} (1,643/sq mi)
- Time zone: UTC+01:00 (CET)
  - Summer (DST): UTC+02:00 (CEST)
- Postal codes: 72575–72581
- Dialling codes: 07123
- Vehicle registration: RT
- Website: www.dettingen-erms.de

Dettingen an der Erms (German pronunciation: [ˈdɛtɪŋən ʔan deːɐ̯ ˈʔɛʁms], lit. 'Dettingen on the Erms') is a town in the district of Reutlingen in Baden-Württemberg in Germany. The town about twelve kilometers north-east of Reutlingen in Baden-Wuerttemberg or about 46 kilometers from Stuttgart. The municipality belongs to the metropolitan region of Stuttgart.

== Geographical location ==
The district is located in the upper Erms Valley between the towns of Bad Urach and Metzingen at the foot of the central Swabian Alb. The town is at an altitude of 372 m above sea level. The following cities and towns bordering the municipality of Dettingen, they are listed clockwise, starting in the north 1) Neuffen, 2) Hülben, 3) Bad Urach, 4) St. Johann and 5) Metzingen.

== Religion ==
A church has been located in Dettingen since the 11th century. As in all of Württemberg, the Reformation was introduced in 1534; the community is primarily Lutheran (Evangelisch). In 1967 a second Protestant church was located in the district Buchhalde.

After the Second World War Roman Catholic community increased in size. In addition, the New Apostolic Church is represented in the town.

In Dettingen the Evangelical Brotherhood Kecharismai eV, operates a two garden businesses and a retirement home.

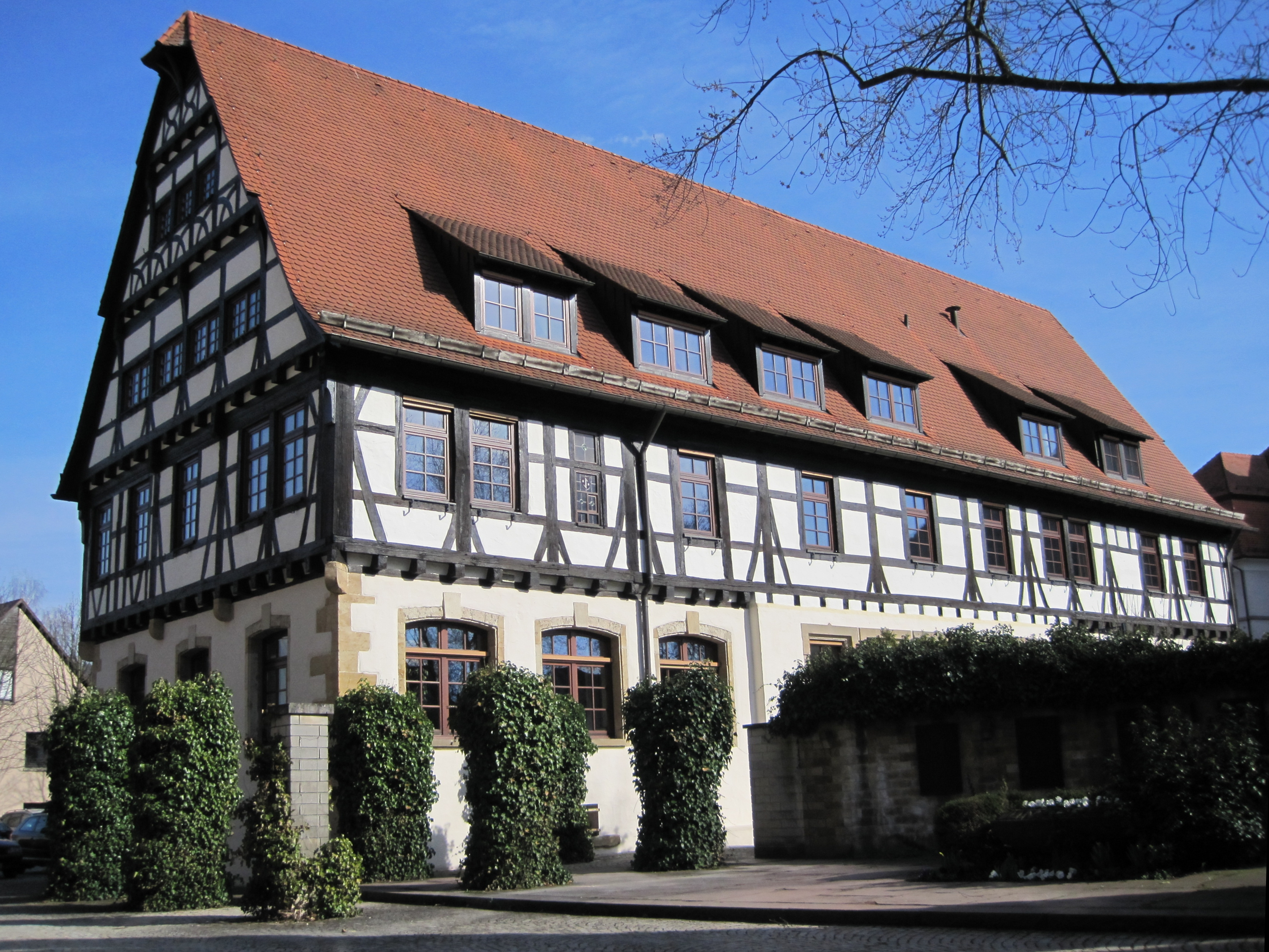
Town hall

== Mayor / Bürgermeister ==
In March 2018 Michael Hillert was elected with 92% of the vote. It was Hillert's third term as mayor.

=== Coat of Arms or Shield ===
The city's red shield features 1) golden double hook and 2) the top left and bottom right of each includes a six-pointed golden star. The double hook is referred to in common parlance as Wolfsangel. The Wolfsangel ("wolf-hook") is a German term for certain heraldic charges. It represents a stylized wolf-hook, a German wolf-hunting device. A wolf-hook is used in a similar way as a fishing hook: it is attached on a chain which is anchored to a tree or similar stout object, and a bait is put on the hook. When the wolf eats the bait, it swallows the hook. The chain prevents the wolf from escaping, and it can be killed at will.

== Culture and Tourist Sights ==
=== Music ===
There are four music societies in Dettingen on the Erms:

- Liederkranz Singing Society - Registered Association (eV), founded 1865
- Dettingen Harmonica Club, founded in March 1931
- VHS orchestra founded in 1960
- Musicians Club of the Erms Valley (Musikverein Ermstalmusikanten) was founded November 23, 1926. This group has about 300 total members and about 45 active musicians. This Brass Band has traveled to the USA five times since 1984 for performances in middle USA, chiefly in Ohio and Michigan.

=== Museums ===
The town features a Hometown Museum (Heimatmuseum) featuring a blacksmithing with a historic forge, a bakery, and historic farmhouse/barn.

There are two famous people from the town, Wilhelm Zimmerman and Johann Ludwig Fricker. The Johann Ludwig House includes memorials to both men.Wilhelm-Zimmermann-Gedenkstätte Johann-Ludwig-Fricker-Haus.

=== Regular Dettingen Events ===
- Cabaret Days in March
- Cherry Festival
- Craft market, always on the first Weekend in October
- Christmas market, this always begins on the first Weekend of Advent
- Dettingen Fair: Always on the first Thursday in June and again on the last Thursday in August

=== Local Parks ===
- Kirschenweg (Cherryway) There are many cherry orchards nearby. The Cherry way (cycle path) is also part of the fruit Erms Valley (Ermstal) cycle path which extends from Neckartenzlingen up to Münsingen.
- Kirschenheimat (Cherry home) Dettingen is the home of a collection of rare or unusual Cherry cultivars from other regions of Europe.
- Garten der Stille (Garden of Tranquillity)
- Skate Park
- Ziegenpfad rund ums Calverbühl (A Goat Path around nearby Calverbühle hill)

=== Sport Clubs ===
- TSV Dettingen/Erms e. V., gegründet 1848 (Gymnastics)
- SG Dettingen (football/soccer)
- Schachverein Dettingen Erms e. V., gegründet 1952 (Chess club)
- Ermstal Türkspor Dettingen/Erms e. V., gegründet 1991 (football/soccer)
- Sergej Juran Swingers – Hobbyfußball & Kneipensport (football/soccer)
- Fischereiverein Ermstal e. V. (fishing club)
- Schützenverein Dettingen/Erms 1909 e. V. (a shooting club, including air rifle,

air pistol, small bore rifles and small caliber pistols for all ages)

- CVJM Dettingen (YMCA)

=== Culture and sights ===
The town is located on the Swabian Poet Road, a road that leads past many interesting sights. This road goes from Bad Mergentheim to Meersburg.

== Sons and daughters of the town ==
- Adam Friedrich Gock (1781–1842), member of parliament
- Andreas Rath (1823–1894), politician and bailiff, member of parliament
- Erwin Dirr (1899–1936), member of parliament

== People who worked in the area ==
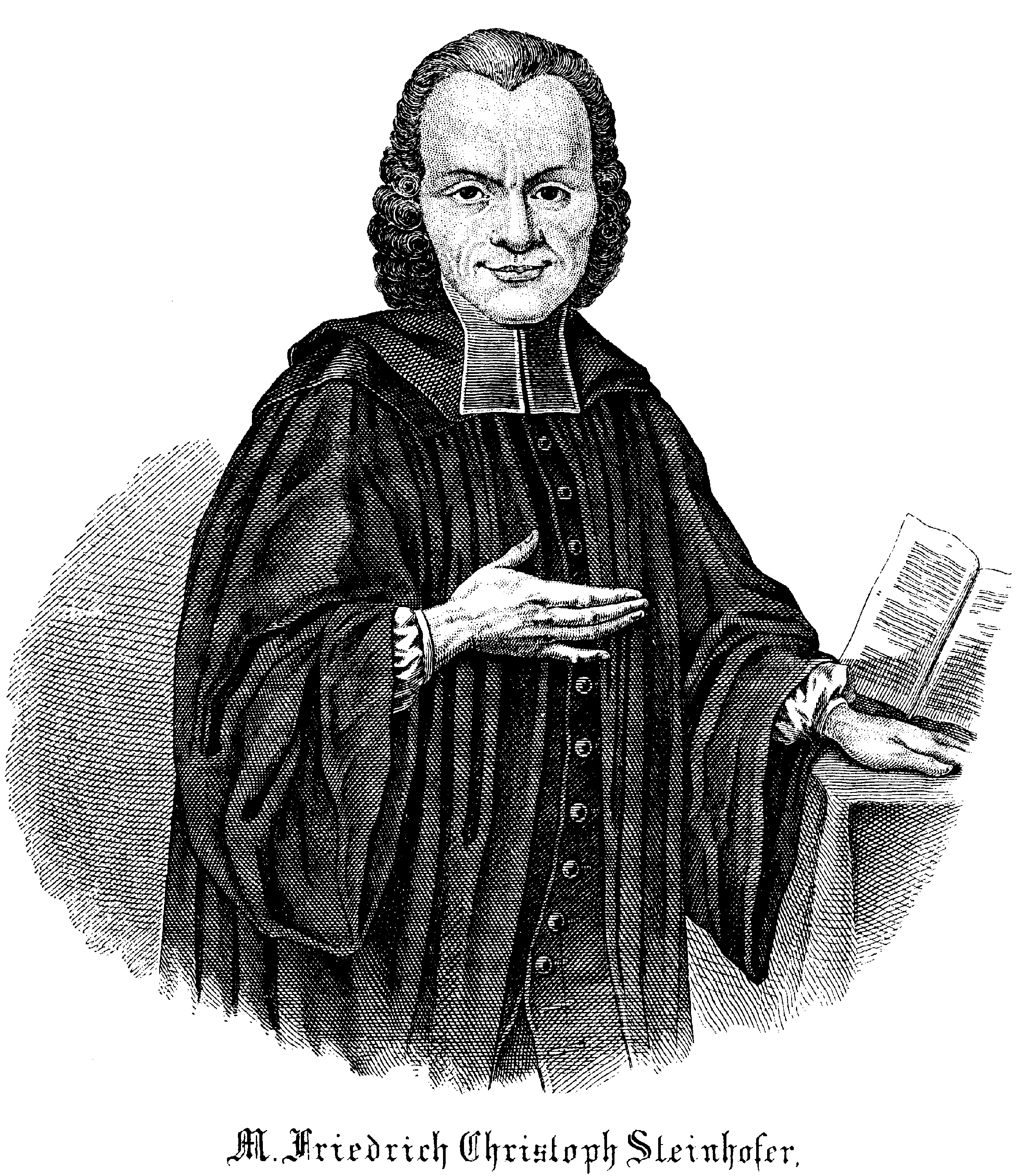
Steinhofer

- Friedrich Christoph Steinhofer (1706-1761), 1746-1749 fellow bishop of the Lutheran trope of Moravian Church
- Johann Ludwig Fricker (1729–1766), deacon in Dettingen and pastor in Hülben, he died in Dettingen
- Wilhelm Zimmermann (1807–1878), deacon in Dettingen and pastor in Hülben; Friend of Eduard Mörike and the deputy Frankfurt Assembly.
- Winfried Wagner (born 1949), dialect author, actor, columnist, writer, lives and works in Dettingen
