= Reutlingen (district) =

Coordinates: 48.5°N 9.21°E

- District
- Flag Coat of arms
- Country: Germany
- State: Baden-Württemberg
- Adm. region: Tübingen
- Capital: Reutlingen

Government
  - District admin.: Ulrich Fiedler

Area
  - Total: 1,094.14 km^{2} (422.45 sq mi)

Population (31 December 2022)
  - Total: 291,696
  - Density: 270/km^{2} (690/sq mi)
- Time zone: UTC+01:00 (CET)
  - Summer (DST): UTC+02:00 (CEST)
- Vehicle registration: RT
- Website: www.kreis-reutlingen.de

Reutlingen, nicknamed "The Gate to the Swabian Alb" (German: "Das Tor zur Schwäbischen Alb"), is a Landkreis (district) in the middle of Baden-Württemberg, Germany. The former free imperial city (until 1802) reached the limit of 100,000 residents in 1989. It is the ninth-largest city in Baden-Württemberg. Reutlingen district's neighbouring districts are (from north clockwise) Esslingen, Göppingen, Alb-Donau, Biberach, Sigmaringen, Zollernalbkreis, Tübingen and Böblingen.

== History ==
The district dates back to the Oberamt Reutlingen, which was created in 1803 when the previously free imperial city Reutlingen became part of Württemberg. In 1934, it was converted into the district, in 1938 the district Urach was dissolved and split between the districts Reutlingen and Münsingen. In 1973 the district Münsingen was dissolved, and most part was merged into the district Reutlingen. A few municipalities from the districts Tübingen, Saulgau, Sigmaringen and Nürtingen were also added.

== Geography ==
The district is largely located in the Swabian Alb (Schwäbische Alb).

== Economy and infrastructure ==
=== Transport ===
The district has no national (A) motorway (German: Autobahn) but has large Federal/National roads (German: Bundesstraßen):

- B 27, Stuttgart - Tübingen
- B 28, Tübingen - Ulm
- B 312, starting at A 8 exit 53b (Plieningen), Stuttgart Airport - A 7 exit 127 (Berkheim), ending near Memmingen, part of the dismissed A 85
- B 313, Plochingen - Sigmaringen
- B 464, distributor road from Reutlingen to B 27, only driving direction Stuttgart in district
- B 465, starting at A 8 exit 57 (Kirchheim unter Teck) - ending at Leutkirch im Allgäu

== Partnerships ==
The district had a friendship with the Czech district Chrudim. In 2002, the Czech districts were reformed and the region Pardubice became the successor of the district Chrudim.

The district also has a friendship with the Italian Province of Parma, as well as the district Sächsische Schweiz (now part of Sächsische Schweiz-Osterzgebirge) in Saxony.

== Coat of arms ==
The coat of arms is the coat of arms of the Counts of Achalm, who ruled the largest part of the district until the 11th century. Even though these counts never used arms by themselves, the Zwiefalten Abbey appointed them these arms.

== Cities and towns ==
Clickable map of towns and municipalities in the district

Towns

1. Bad Urach
2. Hayingen
3. Metzingen
4. Münsingen
5. Pfullingen
6. Reutlingen
7. Trochtelfingen

Administrative collectivities

1. Engstingen
2. Metzingen
3. Münsingen
4. Pliezhausen
5. Bad Urach
6. Zwiefalten-Hayingen

Municipalities

1. Dettingen an der Erms
2. Engstingen
3. Eningen
4. Gomadingen
5. Grabenstetten
6. Grafenberg
7. Hohenstein
8. Hülben
9. Lichtenstein
10. Mehrstetten
11. Pfronstetten
12. Pliezhausen
13. Riederich
14. Römerstein
15. Sonnenbühl
16. St. Johann
17. Walddorfhäslach
18. Wannweil
19. Zwiefalten
