= Scheyern Abbey =

Benedictine abbey in Scheyern, Bavaria

Coordinates: 48°30′05″N 11°27′10″E

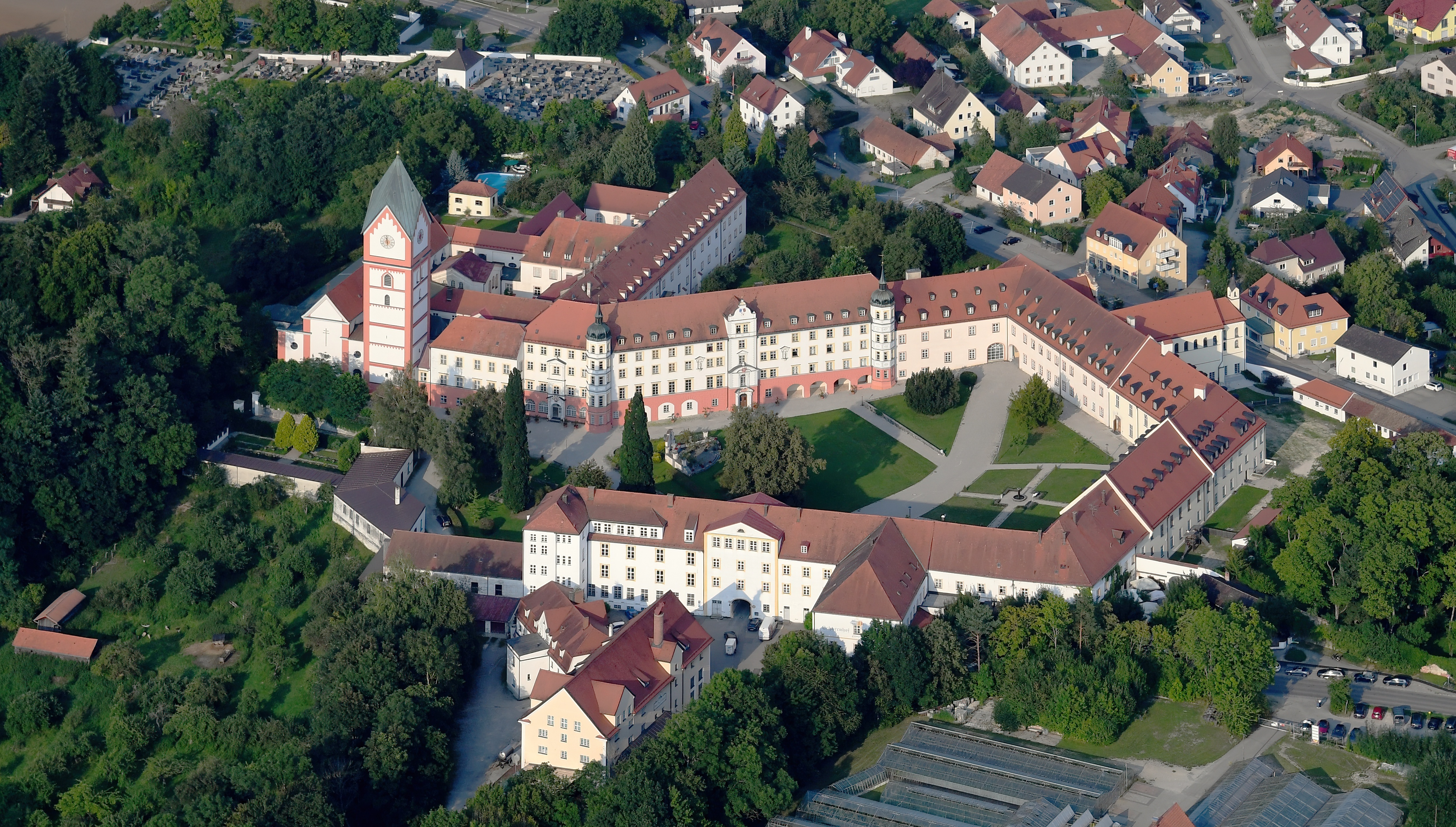
Aerial view of the Scheyern Abbey

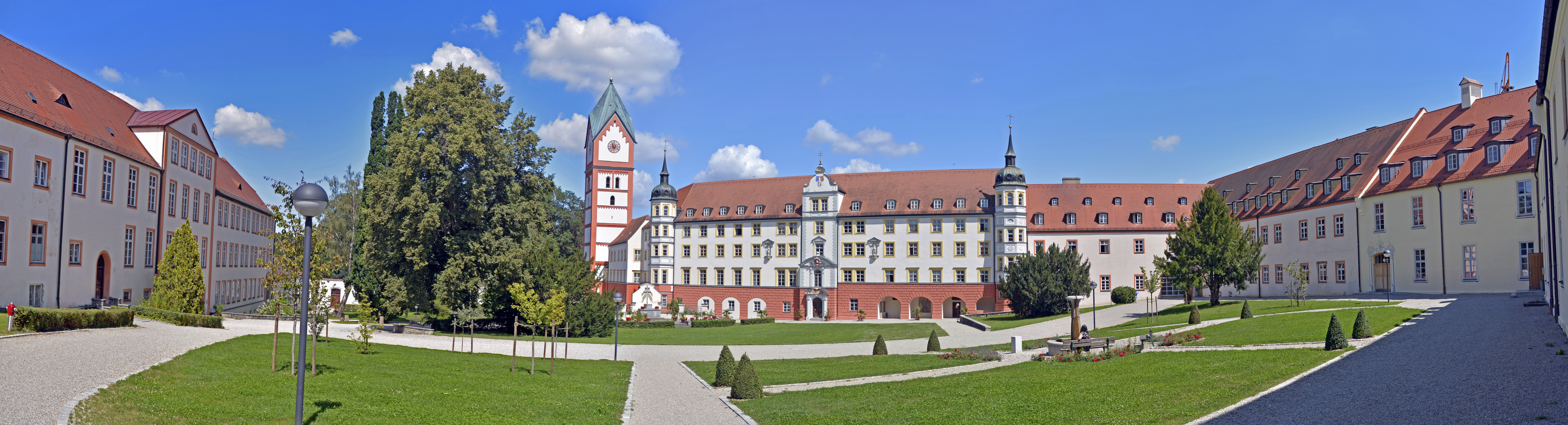
Panorama of Scheyern Abbey

Scheyern Abbey, formerly also Scheyern Priory (German: Kloster Scheyern), is a house of the Benedictine Order in Scheyern in Bavaria.

== First foundation ==
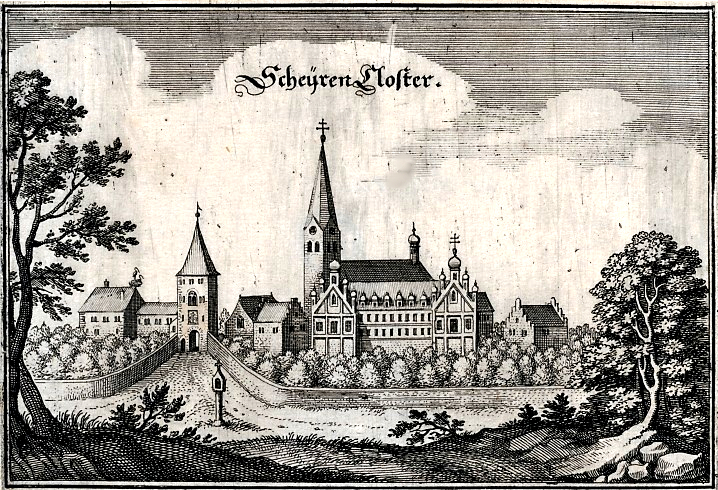
Engraving in "Topographia Germaniae des Matthaeus Merian" of about 1644

The monastery at Scheyern was established in 1119 as the final site of the community founded in around 1077 at Bayrischzell by Countess Haziga of Aragon, wife of Otto II, Count of Scheyern, the ancestors of the Wittelsbachs. The first monks were from Hirsau Abbey, of which the new monastery was a priory, founded as it was against the background of the Investiture Controversy and the Hirsau Reforms. The original site proved unsuitable for a number of reasons, including difficulties with water supply, and the monastery moved in 1087 to Fischbachau. When that site too proved unsuitable, they moved to Petersberg, in 1104.

When Haziga, the widowed Countess of Scheyern, left Burg Scheyern in 1119 for Burg Wittelsbach, the castle from which the family subsequently took their name, the old castle, constructed in about 940, was given to the monks at Petersberg and became Scheyern Abbey, independent of Hirsau.

Scheyern was considered a Wittelsbach family monastery, which they used as a place of burial until 1253. The Wittelsbachs also retained the office of Vogt.

The dedication is to the Holy Cross and the Assumption of the Virgin Mary: the abbey has had in its possession since 1180 a relic of the True Cross from Jerusalem, and is still today a place of pilgrimage for this reason.

By the 13th century the abbey had already gained a reputation for its school of illumination and its scriptorium. It suffered particularly severely in the Thirty Years' War and did not participate afterwards in the Baroque revival to the same extent as other monasteries in Bavaria. In the 18th century however it was refurbished in the style of the Rococo.

On 15 November 1802 the monastery came under the governance of the territorial rulers, and on 21 March 1803 was dissolved as part of the secularisation of Bavaria. The buildings were sold, and changed hands several times in a short period.

== Second foundation ==
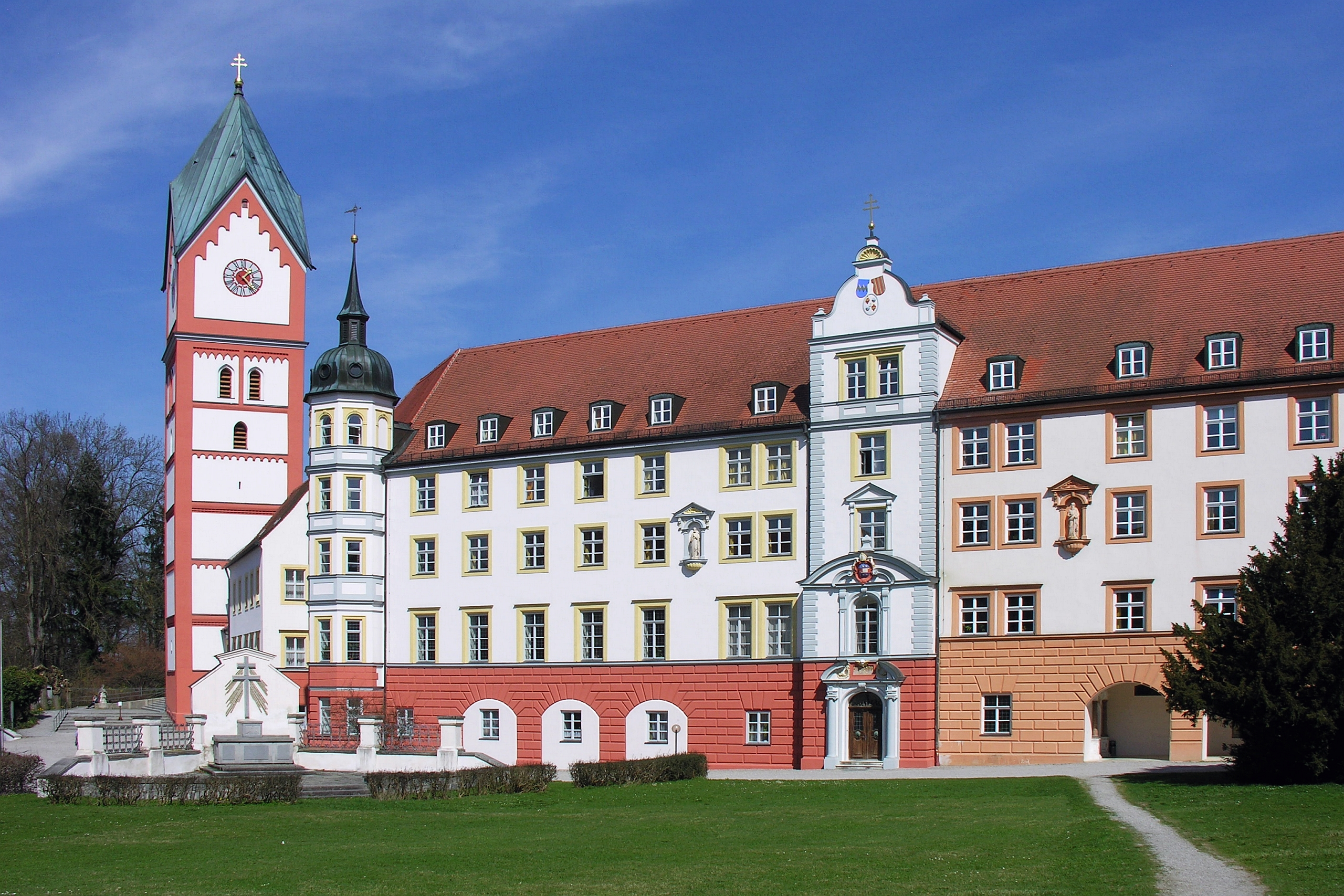
Recent photograph (2011)

In 1838 however under Ludwig I of Bavaria the monastery was re-established, and re-settled by monks from Metten Abbey; in 1843 it regained the status of an abbey. Between 1876 and 1878 the church, now serving both the community and the parish, was restored to the Romanesque style.

Scheyern now also possesses a Byzantine Institute, specialising in the works of Saint John of Damascus. It also enjoys historical links with Hungary.

Scheyern Abbey is a member of the Bavarian Congregation of the Benedictine Confederation.

== Schools ==
Shortly after the re-establishment in 1838, a grammar school was opened. In 1939 all schools run by religious orders were closed, including Scheyern Abbey's. After World War II a humanistic Gymnasium was opened here. It was replaced however in 1970 by the Schyrengymnasium in Pfaffenhofen. Once the transfer to the new school was complete, the monastery set up a residential high school for vocational training, the Staatliche Berufsoberschule, a type of school which was considered very experimental at the time. It opened in 1976 and is still in operation.

== Burials ==
- Otto I of Wittelsbach, Duke of Bavaria
- Louis I, Duke of Bavaria
- Otto II Wittelsbach, Duke of Bavaria
