= Fischbachau Priory =

Benedictine monastery in Bavaria, Germany

Coordinates: 47°43′N 11°57′E

Fischbachau Priory (Kloster Fischbachau) was a Benedictine monastery located in Fischbachau, Bavaria, Germany.

The monastery was founded in 1087 as a priory of Hirsau Abbey against the background of the Investiture Controversy and the Hirsau Reforms, by the monks who had previously formed the small monastery founded in 1077 at Bayrischzell by Haziga of Diessen, wife of Count Otto I of Scheyern, ancestors of the Wittelsbachs. The original site at Bayrischzell was soon abandoned for unsuitability and lack of water. Nor did the monastery remain long at Fischbachau; the community moved on, for much the same reasons as before, to yet another site at the little village of Petersberg, and from there a final time to Scheyern, where they remained and which became Scheyern Abbey.

A small priory or cell remained however at Fischbachau, which was from then on a priory or cell of Scheyern, centred on the church of Saint Martin. This was refurbished in about 1700 in the Rococo style, of which it remains a spectacular example.

The monastic community was dissolved during secularisation in 1803, and only the church, the Martinskirche, is left.
