= Schönlein =

Schönlein, Schoenlein may refer to:

- Johann Lukas Schönlein (1793, Bamberg – 1864), a German professor of medicine
  - Henoch–Schönlein purpura (HSP, German: Purpura Schönlein-Henoch, also known as "anaphylactoid purpura", "purpura rheumatica", and "Schönlein–Henoch purpura)
- Blasius Schönlein, Abbot (1585 - 1595) of the Cloister of St. Georgen im Schwarzwald
- Herrmann Schönlein (1833–1908), German publisher
- Peter Schönlein (1939–2016), German politician (SPD)
