= Schönrain Priory =

- Kloster Schönrain
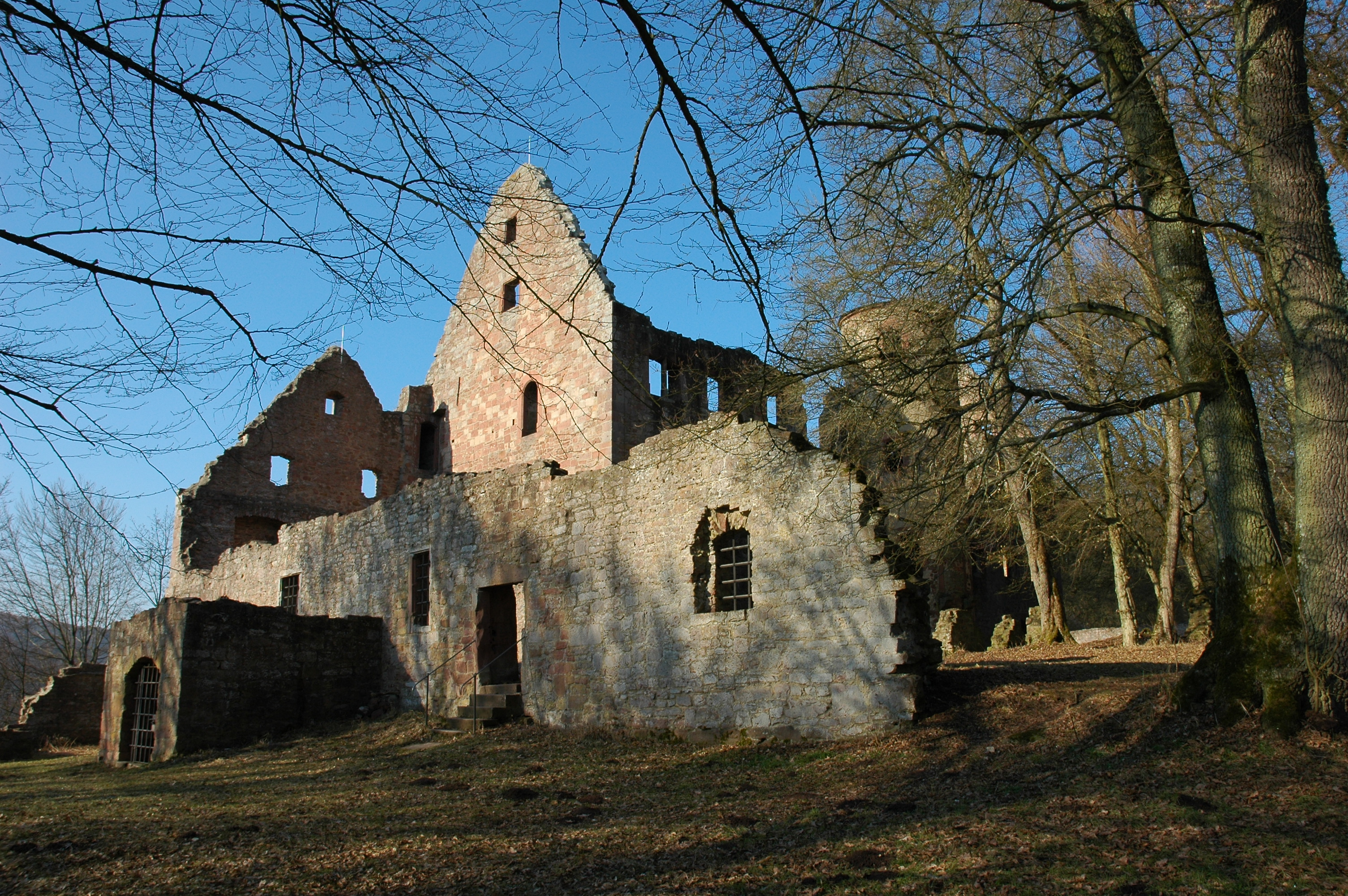
- The ruins in 2006

- Location within Bavaria
- Interactive map of Schönrain Priory

Monastery information
- Order: Benedictines
- Established: circa 1100
- Disestablished: 1526

Architecture
- Groundbreaking: circa 1100

Site
- Location: near Lohr am Main
- Coordinates: 50°01′50″N 9°39′23″E
- Public access: yes

Schönrain Priory (German: Kloster Schönrain) was a house of the Benedictine Order located near Lohr in the Spessart, in Bavaria in southern Germany. Few signs of the monastic buildings are visible today. The ruins that remain mostly consist of later additions when the structure served as a temporal dwelling and foresters' lodge.

== History ==
There is a legend that it was founded in the Carolingian period, in about 750, by Saint Lioba, and some have argued that a few traces of architecture from that period survive.

However, firm information on this place is available only from the 11th century, when the monastery, with some property to endow it, was given by Landgraf de:Ludwig der Bärtige of Sangerhausen or his sons Berengar and Ludwig to Hirsau Abbey, reportedly after the younger Ludwig had killed Markgraf Friedrich III during a hunt in 1065. After being incarcerated, Ludwig escaped. He founded Reinhardsbrunn Abbey near Coburg and possibly gifted his possession at Schönrain to Hirsau. Around 1100, abbot Wilhelm von Hirsau built the monastery, from which the monks served the whole region between Lohr, Gemünden am Main and Karlstadt am Main.

In 1159, Schönrain swapped property at nearby Massenbuch for Hofstetten (today both are part of Gemünden). The local feudal lords were the Counts of Rieneck, kin of the founders, who persistently over the next centuries tried to acquire the property for themselves. They built a castle nearby to protect the priory. After a power struggle with the Bishop of Würzburg, they had to demolish it in 1243.

In 1376, the Rieneck family sold their local properties to Würzburg, but retained the position of Vögte (or lay stewards) of Schönrain.

Eventually, after severe damages sustained during the German Peasants' War, the then Abbot of Hirsau dissolved the monastery at Schönrain and sold the premises to Philipp von Rieneck in 1526, who re-built it as a residence for his wife Margaretha around 1535. After his death, it served as Margaretha's dowager house for another 15 years.

In 1559, Schönrain came to Anton von Isenburg-Büdingen. When that family line failed in 1601, the site passed permanently to the Prince-Bishops of Würzburg, who used it as accommodation for their forestry officials until 1625. It was heavily damaged in the Thirty Years' War and served as a local source of construction materials. The Bishopric was secularised in 1803 and Schönrain later continued in use by the forestry officials of the Kingdom of Bavaria. When their headquarters was moved elsewhere in 1818, the buildings at Schönrain were stripped for building materials, and the site has been in ruins since that time.

== Today ==
Since 1973 the site and the ruins have been under the protection of a local environmental and historical preservation group, the Lohrer Heimatfreunde.

The de:Schönraintunnel, completed in 1993, passes beneath the ruins.
