= Reichenbach Priory (Baden-Württemberg) =

Monastery in Baden-Württemberg, Germany

Coordinates: 48°31′32″N 8°24′05″E

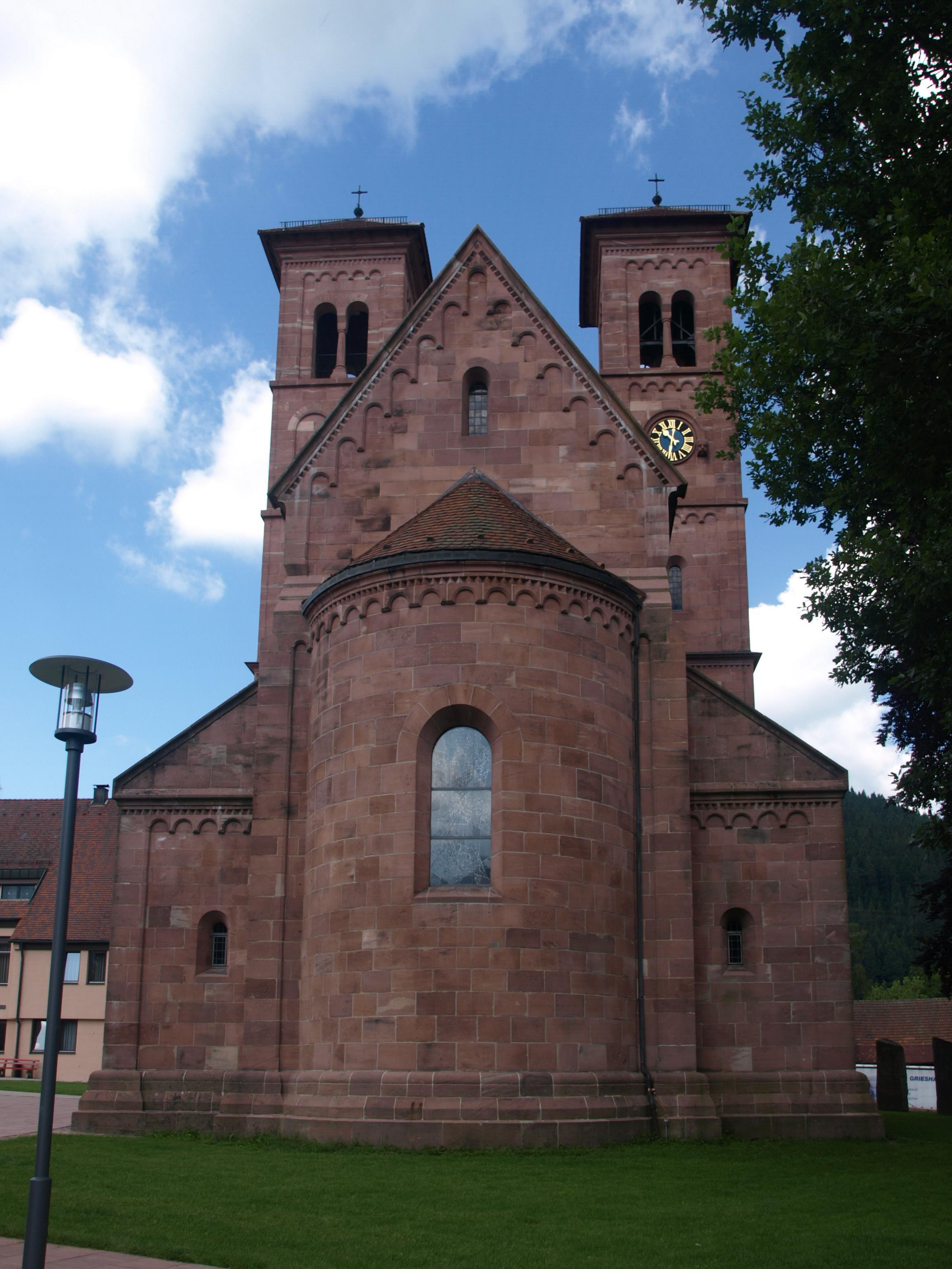
East choir

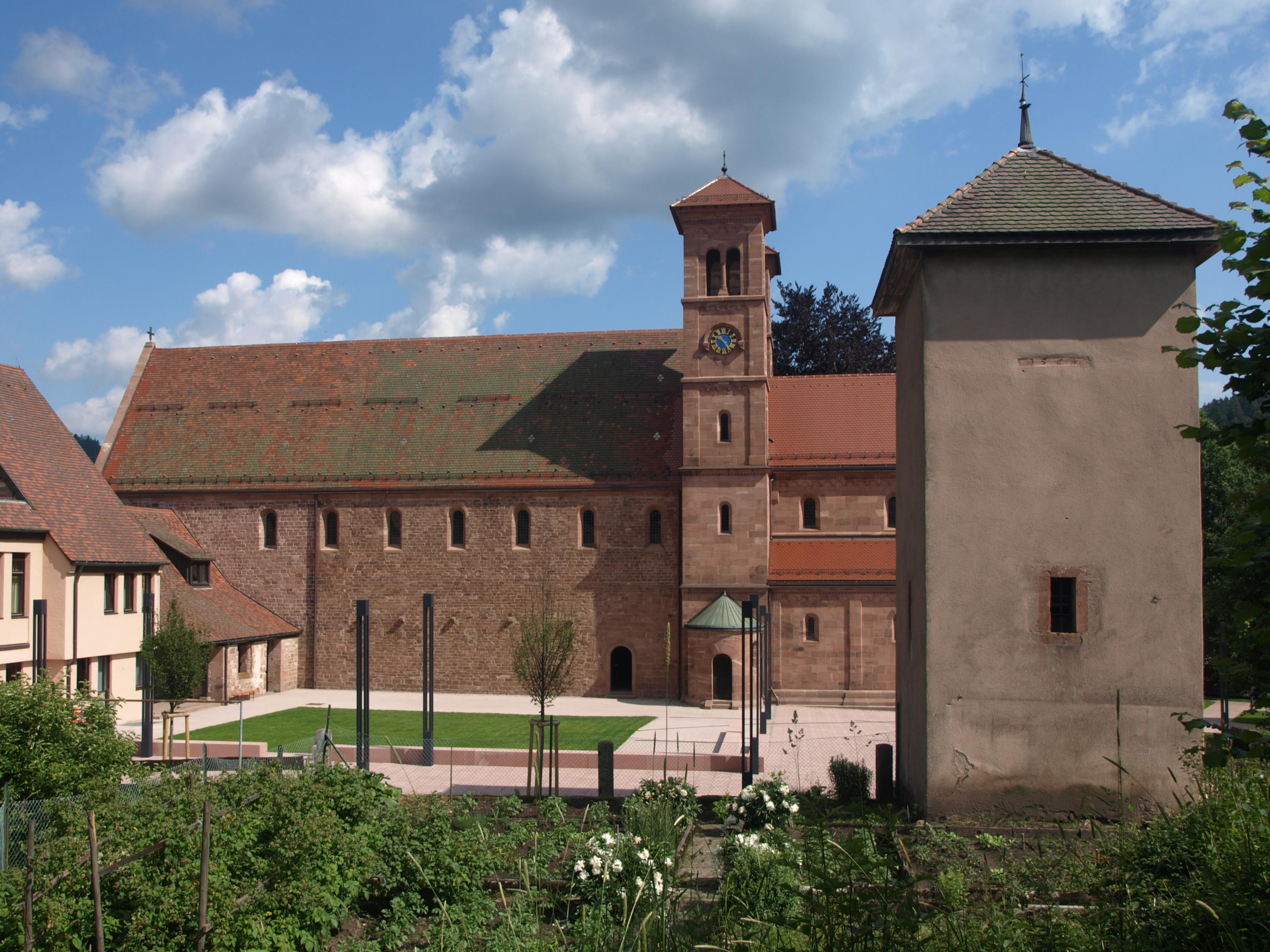
View of the church

Reichenbach Priory (German: Kloster Reichenbach) was a Benedictine monastery, located at Klosterreichenbach, now part of Baiersbronn in Baden-Württemberg in Germany.

== History ==
The monastery was founded, against the background of the Investiture Controversy and the Hirsau Reforms, as a priory of Hirsau Abbey, from where it was settled, in 1082; in 1085 the church was dedicated to Saint Gregory the Great by Bishop Gebhard of Konstanz.

The Vögte (lords protectors) of the monastery were the Counts of Eberstein, but the equivalent rights over Hirsau lay with the Counts of Württemberg, who considered that as Reichenbach was a priory of Hirsau, their rights should extend there also. The conflict between the two factions continued until the Reformation, when the monastery was turned into a Protestant establishment in 1603.

It was re-catholicised during the Thirty Years' War and occupied by monks from Wiblingen Abbey, who however had to leave again after the Peace of Westphalia in 1648. Since then the village of Klosterreichenbach which had developed around the monastery has remained Protestant. The buildings of the former monastery have been partially restored in the 19th and 20th century. The church is now the parochial Lutheran church of the village.
