= Blaubeuren Abbey =

Monastery in Baden-Württemberg, Germany

Coordinates: 48°24′55″N 9°47′4″E

- German: Kloster Blaubeuren
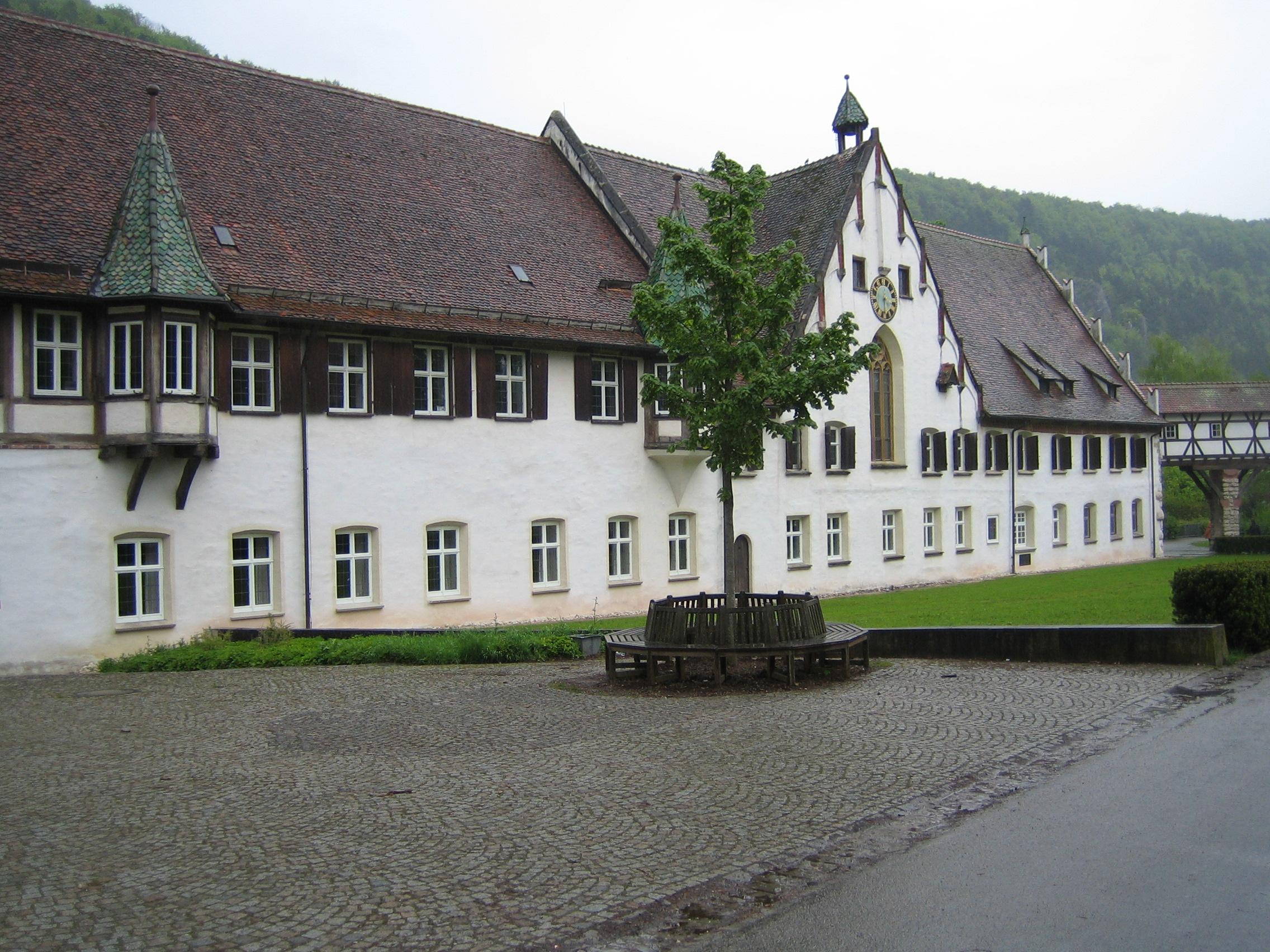

Information
- Established: 1085; 941 years ago (monastery); 1817; 209 years ago (school)
- Founder: Sigiboto von Ruck

Blaubeuren Abbey (German: Kloster Blaubeuren) was a Benedictine monastery until the Reformation, located in Blaubeuren, Baden-Württemberg, Germany. It is now a Protestant seminary.

== History: Catholic ==
The monastery was founded in 1085 by the Counts of Tübingen and their vassal Sigiboto von Ruck, against the background of the Investiture Controversy and the Hirsau Reforms. The first abbot, Adzelinus, and monks were from Hirsau Abbey.

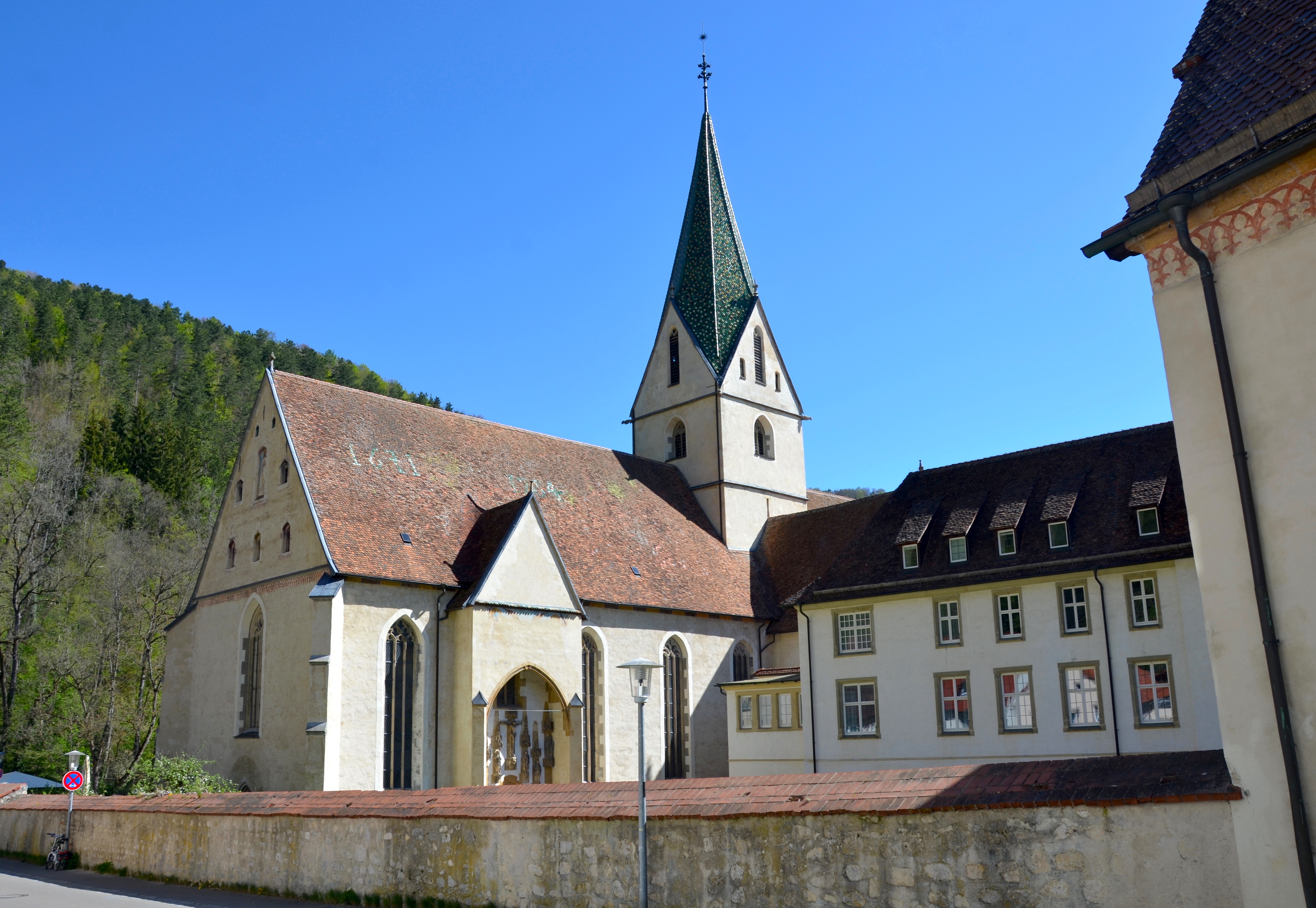
Abbey church, with roof tiles showing the year 1671

Abbot Fabri was closely involved with the foundation of the University of Tübingen in 1477. In 1493 the high altar was created. The choir stalls by Jörg Syrlin the Younger are of a similar date.

The Reformation saw the end of the Catholic monastery, from which the monks were expelled in 1535, returning for a short time between 1549 and 1562.

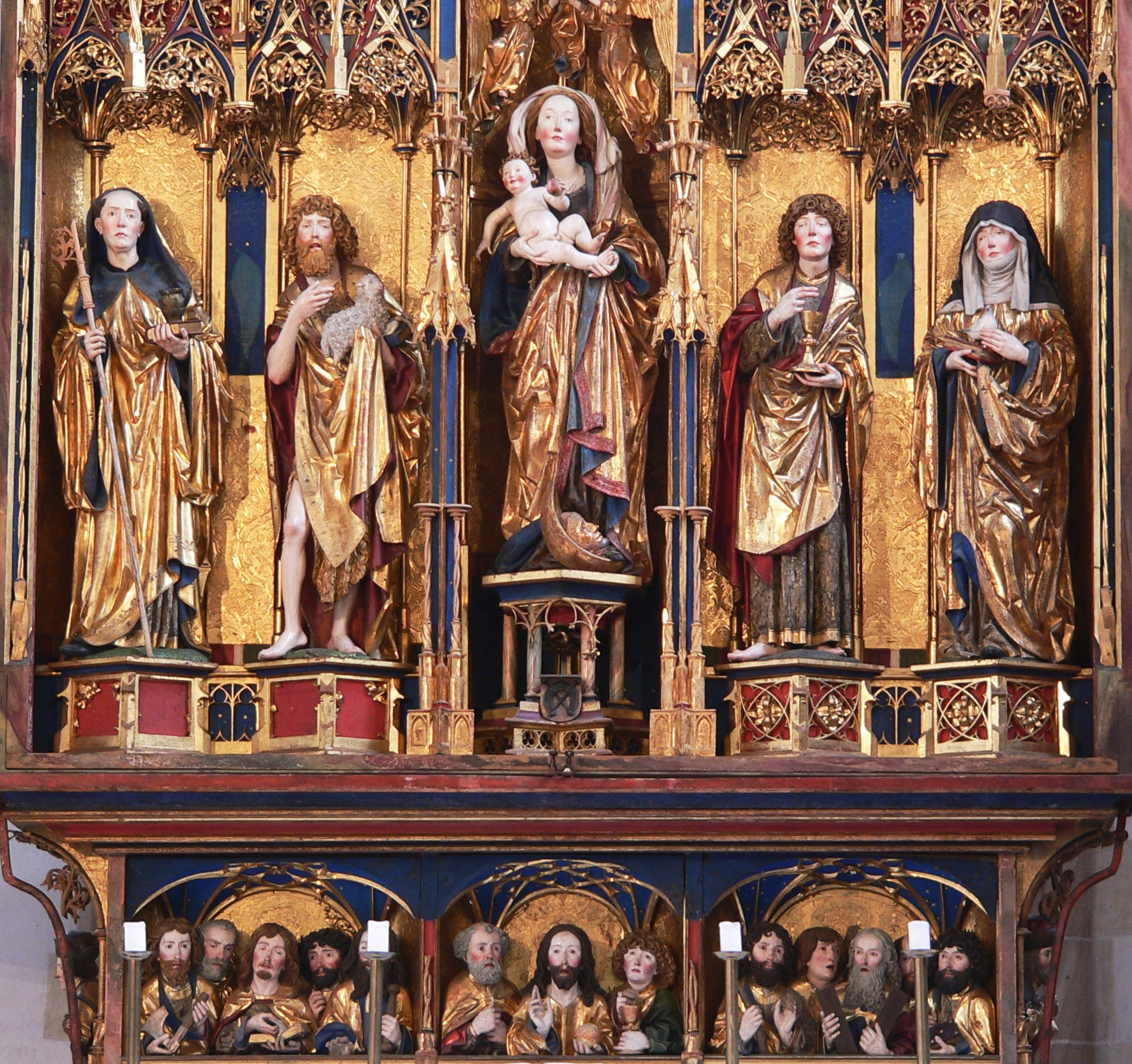
Reredos of the high altar (central detail), by Michel Erhart

== History: Protestant ==
In 1563 the first Protestant abbot was appointed, and in 1565 a choir school was opened in the premises.

During the Thirty Years' War the monks returned again in 1630 and yet again in 1648, but were expelled; the choir school closed in 1630 and reopened in 1650. It was finally shut down in 1807.

A few years later in 1817 Blaubeuren became a Protestant seminary with an attached boarding school, which has remained to the present, except for a closure during World War II.

The school now operates in co-operation with the similar establishment at Maulbronn Abbey: see Evangelical Seminaries of Maulbronn and Blaubeuren.
