= William of Hirsau =

Benedictine abbot and reformer (c.1030–1091)

Blessed William of Hirsau OSB
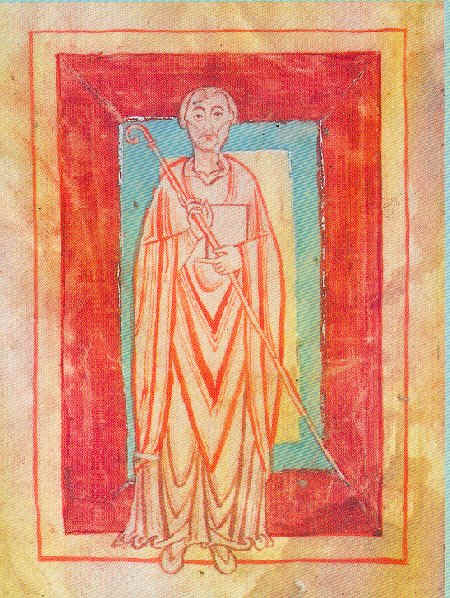
- William of Hirsau, from the cartulary of Reichenbach Priory

Abbot, Reformer
- Born: 1030; Bavaria
- Hometown: Saint Emmeram's Abbey
- Residence: Hirsau Abbey
- Died: 5 July 1091; Hirsau Abbey
- Honored in: Catholic Church
- Major shrine: Hirsau Abbey
- Feast: 4 or 5 July
- Attributes: crosier and book

William of Hirsau (German: Wilhelm von Hirschau; c. 1030 – 5 July 1091) was a Benedictine abbot and monastic reformer. He was abbot of Hirsau Abbey, for whom he created the Constitutiones Hirsaugienses, based on the uses of Cluny, and was the father of the Hirsau Reforms, which influenced many Benedictine monasteries in Germany. He supported the papacy in the Investiture Controversy. In the Roman Catholic Church, he is a Blessed, the second of three steps toward recognition as a saint.

== Early life ==
William was born in Bavaria, possibly in about 1030; nothing more is known of his origins. As a puer oblatus entrusted to the Benedictines he received his education as a monk in St. Emmeram's Abbey, a private church of the Bishop of Regensburg, where the famous Otloh of St. Emmeram was William's teacher. It is generally believed that it was here that William first became friends with Ulrich of Zell (later distinguished as a Cluniac reformer and a saint), a friendship which lasted to the end of his life. William combined personal asceticism with an amiability toward others.

== Activities ==
William became a priest and taught mathematics and astronomy. He was a skilled musician and made various improvements on the flute. About the middle of the 11th century, William composed learned treatises on astronomy and music, disciplines that formed part of the quadrivium, in the knowledge of which William was considered unsurpassed in his day.

He constructed various astronomical instruments, made a sun-dial which showed the variations of the heavenly bodies, the solstices, equinoxes and other phenomena. His famous stone astrolabe can still be seen today in Regensburg: more than 2.5 metres high, it is engraved on the front with an astrolabe sphere, while on the reverse side is the figure of a man gazing into the heavens, presumed to be the Greek astronomer and poet Aratos of Soloi (of the 3rd century B.C.).

== Abbacy ==
The Counts of Calw had dismissed Abbot Friedrich of Hirsau Abbey. as elected successor to the deposed Abbot Frederick. Their distant connection to the Bishop of Regensburg probably led to William's being sent as successor in May 1069. He immediately took over the management of the monastery, but refused to accept the abbatial benediction till after the death of his unjustly deposed predecessor in 1071. He was solemnly inaugurated by the Bishop of Speyer on Ascension Day in 1071.

In his first years of office he pursued the goal of making the abbey independent of secular powers, on the basis of the reforms of Gorze Abbey in Lorraine and of Cluny, which had begun to take effect some time previously. This policy put him in direct opposition to Hirsau's powerful lay abbots, the Counts of Calw. A writ of Emperor Henry IV, probably drafted shortly after 1070, although it created the important link between the abbey and the monarchy, nevertheless largely confirmed the status of Hirsau as a private monastery of the counts.

However, a privilege of Pope Gregory VII, drawn up between 1073 and 1075, put Hirsau under papal protection.

William eventually prevailed against Count Adalbert II of Calw, who renounced his lay lordship over the abbey. Henry IV immediately put the monastic community under his own protection, although Hirsau was not made an imperial abbey directly answerable to the monarch (reichsunmittelbar). The count received by royal grant the Vogtei of the abbey. The abbey, by deed of 9 October 1075, received the "complete freedom of the monastery", which included the freedom to elect and invest the abbot, and to elect or dismiss the Vogt, although it is true that the choice of candidates for the latter position was restricted to the kin of the founder.

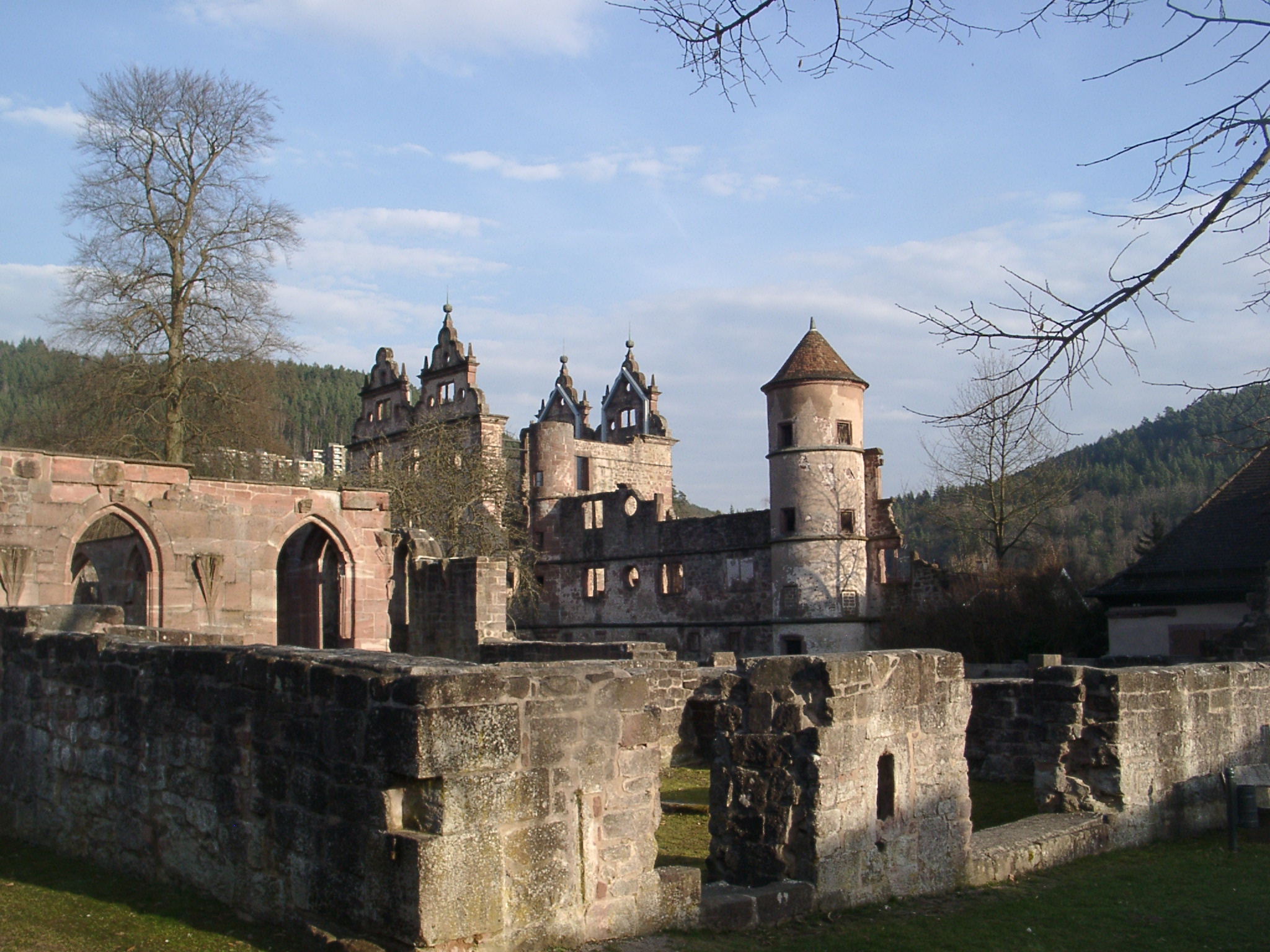
Ruins of Hirsau Abbey

Under William's abbacy, Hirschau reached the zenith of its glory and, despite the unusually strict monastic discipline which he introduced from Cluny, the number of priest-monks increased from 15 to 150. As the monastery, dedicated to Saint Aurelius, was cramped, over-crowded and subject to flooding, He built a new monastic complex on the opposite side of the Nagold. There, sometime after 1083, was built the largest monastery complex in Germany of the time, with its great Romanesque church dedicated to Saint Peter. The former site, he converted into a priory. In 1075 William went to Rome to obtain the papal confirmation for the exemption of Hirschau. On this occasion he became acquainted with Pope Gregory VII, with whose efforts towards reforms he was in deep sympathy and whom he afterwards strongly supported in the Investiture Controversy against Henry IV.

== Hirsau Reforms ==
William became the leading agent of the Gregorian reform in Germany. He introduced to Hirsau, from no later than 1079, a number of reforms originating in Cluny, on which he based the "Constitutiones Hirsaugienses" ("Customs of Hirsau"), which later became very widespread as a result of the "Hirsau Reforms". These reforms particularly focused on discipline and obedience, tough punishments for infringements of the rules and continuous supervision of the monks.

Parallel with these developments he found it necessary, in order to bring under some sort of control the great numbers of laymen flocking to Hirsau, to create the institution of the conversi in the German Benedictine monasteries. Before this there were certainly men-servants in the monasteries, but they lived outside the monastery, wore no specifically religious clothing and took no vows.

"The monastic reforms he called for in his "Hirsau Reform" became the most influential reforms of the 11th and 12th centuries east of the Rhine river, and served as an example to other monasteries." Many monasteries, perhaps as many as 200, both newly founded and long established, embraced the Hirsau Reforms. New abbeys, settled by monks from Hirsau, included Zwiefalten, Blaubeuren, St. Peter im Schwarzwald and St. Georgen im Schwarzwald in Swabia, and Reinhardsbrunn in Thuringia. Already existing monasteries which accepted the reforms included Petershausen near Konstanz, Schaffhausen, Comburg, and St. Peter's in Erfurt. Finally, there were the priories such as Reichenbach in Baden-Württemberg, Schönrain in Franconia and Fischbachau in Bavaria.

He also had a standard edition of the Vulgate made for all the monasteries of the reform.

== Political implications ==
Support for the reforms came primarily from Swabia and Franconia, with a smaller following in Central and East Germany. The spread of the Hirsau Reforms was directly related to the reputation William had acquired through the ecclesio-political propaganda of the Investiture Controversy, as the main support of Pope Gregory's faction in Germany and in Swabia. He was on the side of the counter-kings Rudolf of Swabia (1077–1080) and Herman of Luxemburg, Count of Salm (1081–1088). Among other things, the tenacity of the Gregorian party in south-west Germany was due to him, quite apart from the reputation of Hirsau Abbey among ecclesiastical reformers.

William died on 5 July 1091 and was buried in the abbey church.

== Legacy ==
Besides composing the Constitutiones Hirsaugienses William of Hirsau was the author of the treatises "De astronomia", of which only the prologue is printed and "De musica". For centuries, he was miscredited with William of Conches's De Philosophia Mundi, causing some scholars to further miscredit him with having originated St Anselm's ontological argument for the existence of God.

His life is recorded in the Vita Willihelmi abbatis Hirsaugiensis.

William of Hirsau is commemorated by the Benedictines on 4 or 5 July.

== See also ==
- Hirsau Abbey
