= Reinhardsbrunn =

Building in Friedrichroda, Thuringia, Germany

Coordinates: 50°52′06″N 10°33′27″E

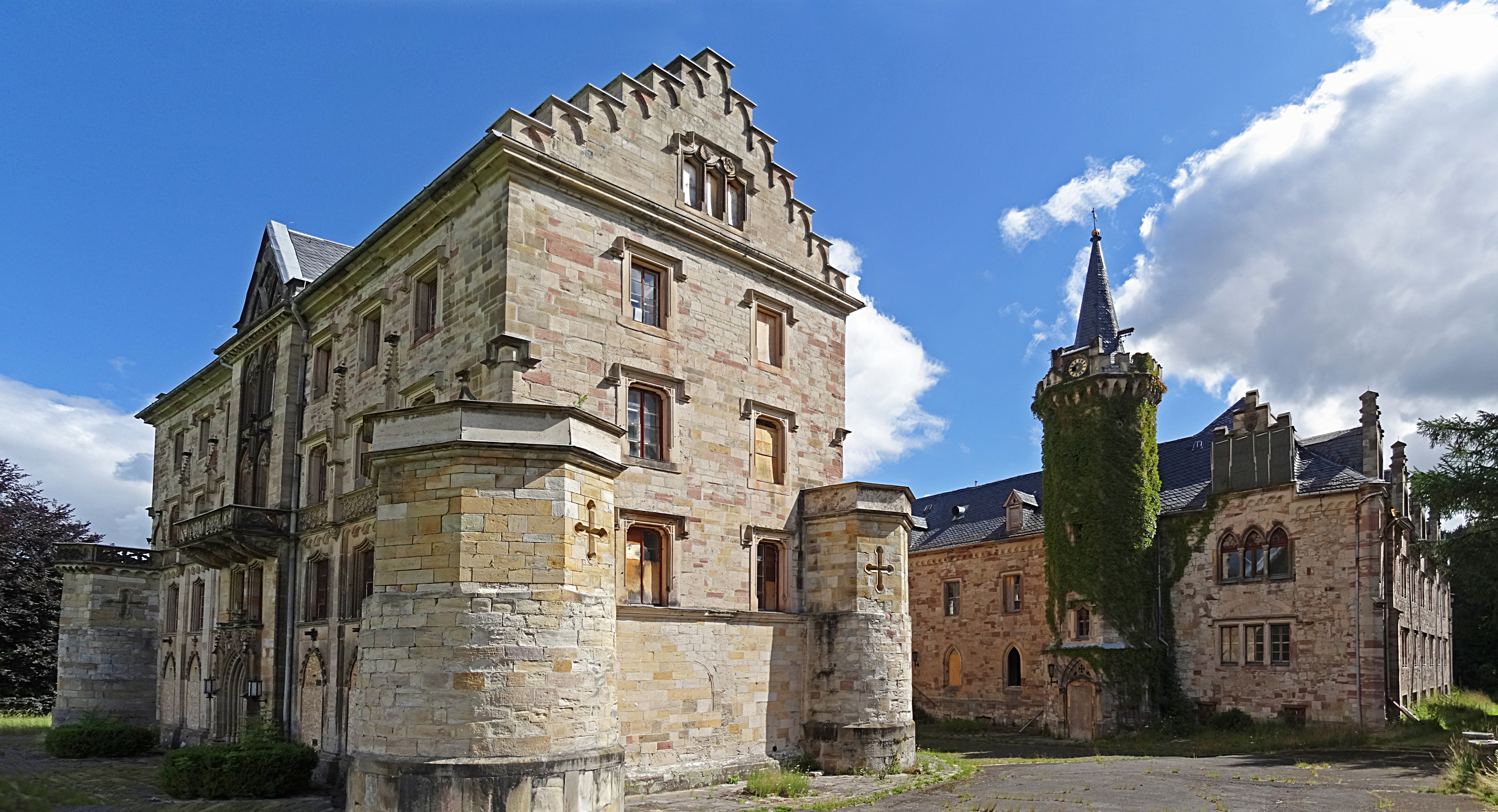
The palace seen from the south in 2020

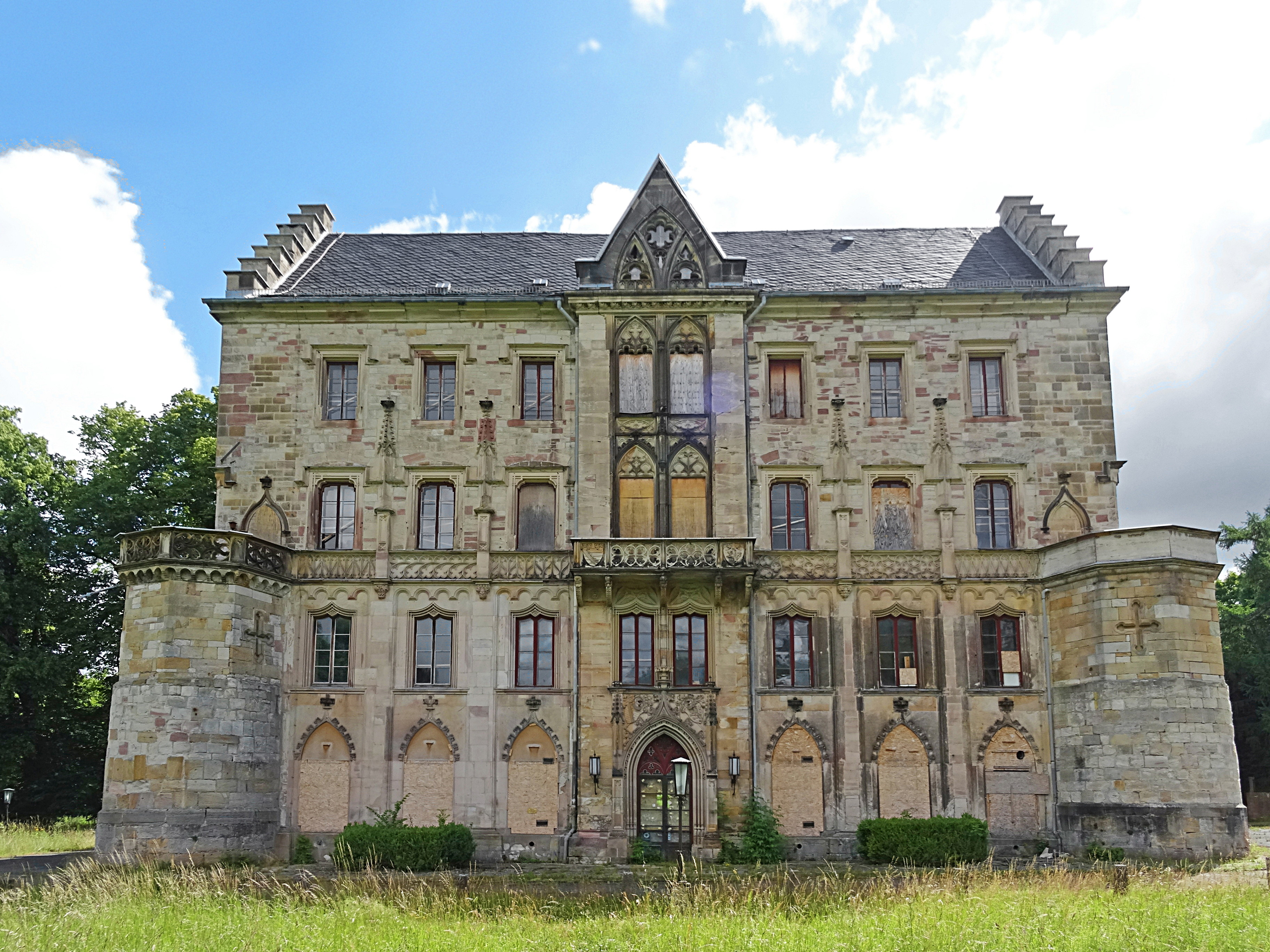
The west front of the palace in 2020

Reinhardsbrunn is a historic complex in Friedrichroda near Gotha, in the German state of Thuringia. From its founding in 1085 to 1525, it was the site of the Benedictine house monastery of the Ludovingian Landgraves of Thuringia. Later used as an administrative seat by the Ernestine dukes of Saxony, the property was turned into a castle and park erected by the Dukes of Saxe-Coburg and Gotha from 1827.

== Monastery ==
Reinhardsbrunn Abbey (German: Kloster Reinhardsbrunn) was a house of the Benedictine Order founded by the Thuringian landgrave Louis the Springer in 1085, against the background of the fierce Investiture Controversy between Emperor and Pope. It may have been named after a nearby freshwater spring named Reinhards's Brunnen. It was settled by monks from Hirsau Abbey and soon evolved as a centre of the Hirsau Reforms in Thuringia. Like Hirsau, the Reinhardsbrunn monastery was closely related to Cluny Abbey; it stood under Papal protection from 1093. It was also of significance as the proprietary monastery and burial ground of the Ludovingian landgraves such as Hermann I, who was entombed in the Abbey Church in 1217. Frederick I, Margrave of Meissen was also buried at the Abbey.

The monastery became less important after the extinction of the Ludovingians in 1247. Nevertheless, their Wettin successors still used it as a dynastic burial site and an important chronicle was commissioned around 1340, reflecting the history of Thuringia and Germany back to the 6th century. The monastery was looted and sacked during the German Peasants' War in 1525. The monks fled to Gotha and the site was secularized and sold to the Electors of Saxony. In 1530, nine Anabaptists were imprisoned in Reinhardsbrunn by the Lutheran Superintendent of Gotha, Friedrich Myconius. Six of them who refused to recant their faith were executed in the monastery park. These were the first Anabaptists that were executed for their beliefs on Lutheran territory. While the surrounding estates were administrated by Saxon Amtmann officials, the former monastery buildings fell into ruin.

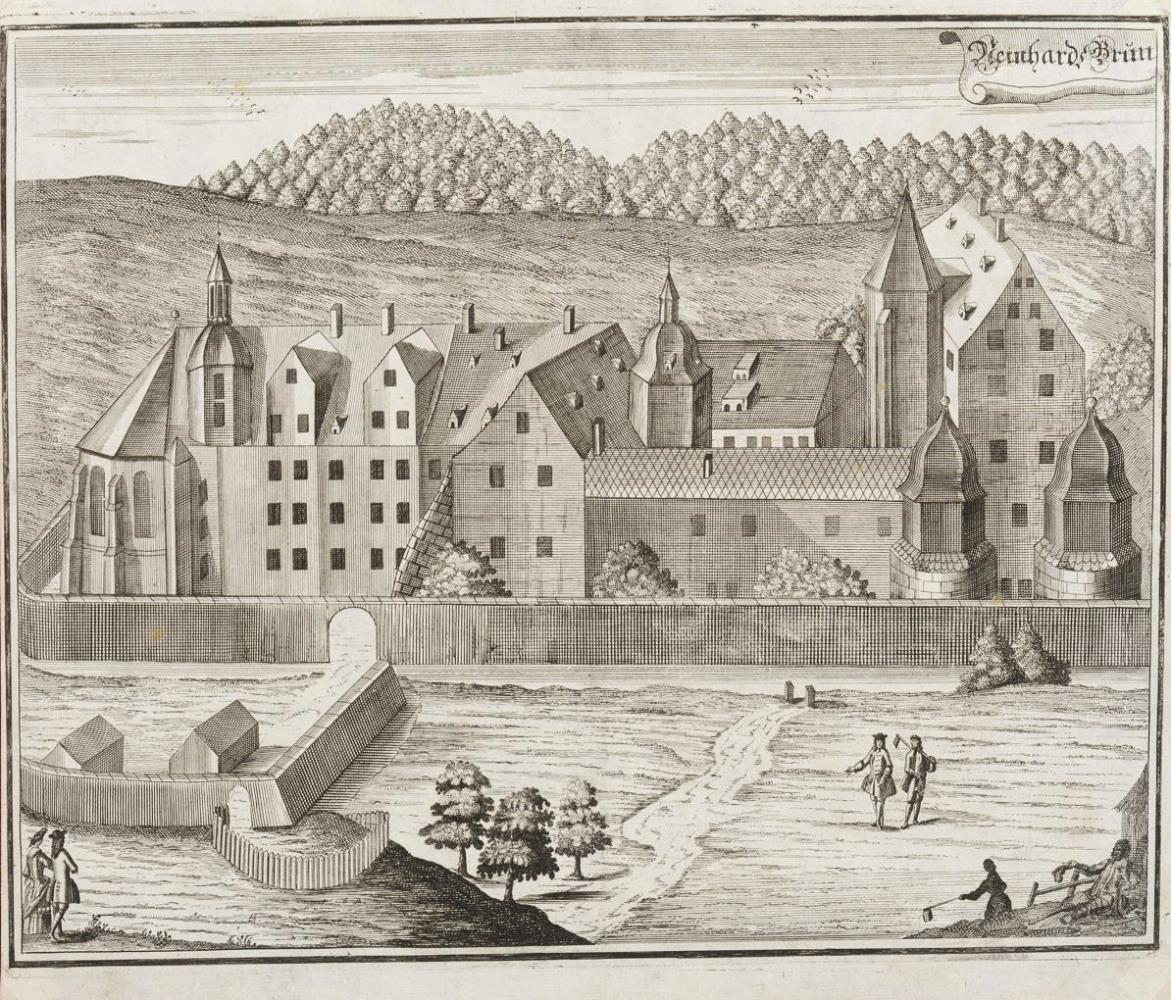
Reinhardsbrunn in an engraving from 1717

== Palace and park ==
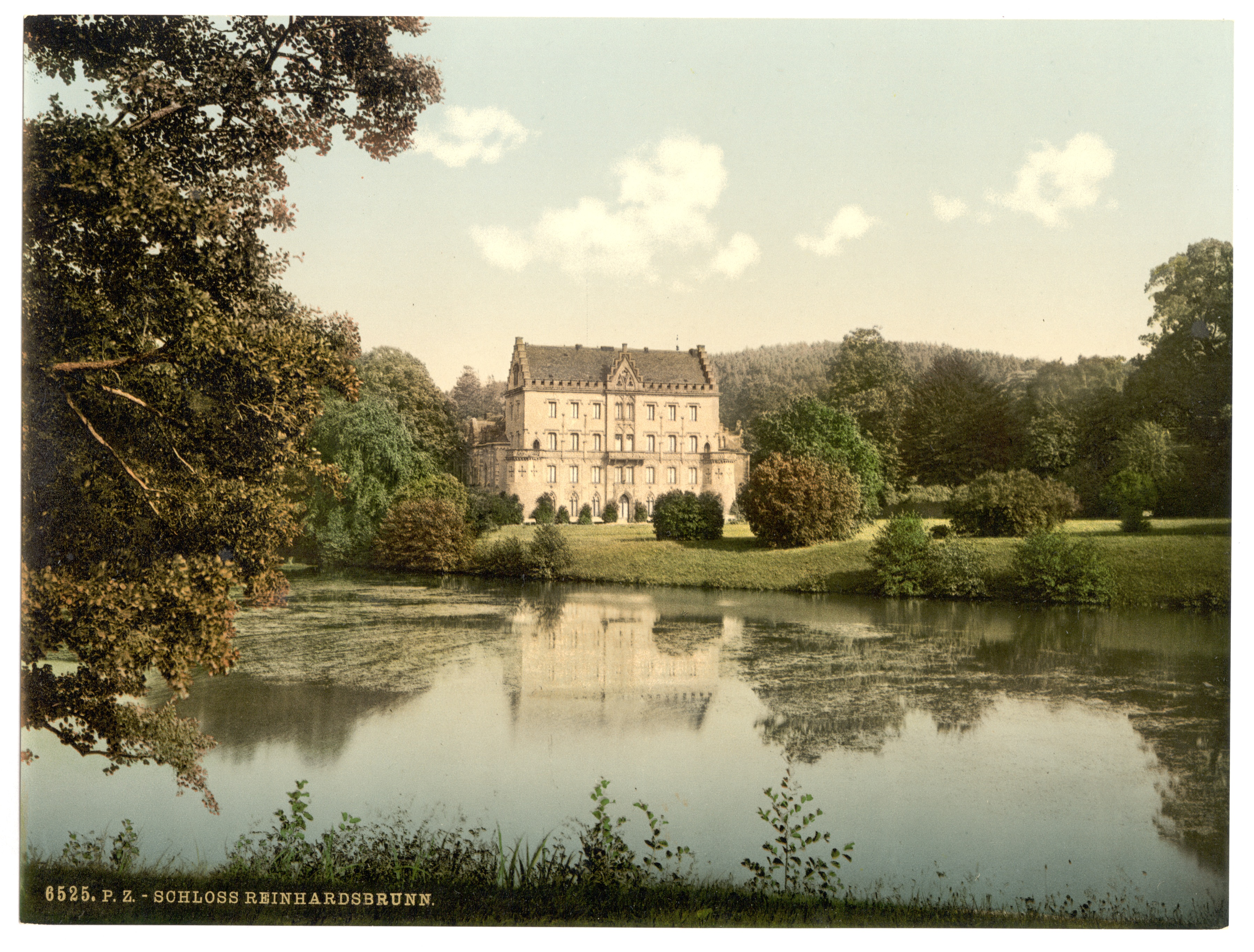
Schloss Reinhardsbrunn in the late 19th century

Reinhardsbrunn was part of the Ernestine duchy of Saxe-Weimar from 1572. Duke Friedrich Wilhelm I had parts of the monastery rebuilt as a local administrative seat. His brother, Johann II, planned a reconstruction of the palace, but died before construction could start, however, his widow, Dorothea Maria of Anhalt, initiated some renovations on the site. The main castle building, restored in about 1706 under Duke Frederick II of Saxe-Gotha-Altenburg, was rebuilt as a pleasure palace - Reinhardsbrunn Palace - in 1827. Duke Ernest I of Saxe-Coburg-Gotha, who had inherited the site the year before, built his summer residence here in an English style, surrounded by the first Romantic park in Thuringia. Ernst I was the father of Prince Albert, and hence the father-in-law to Queen Victoria of the United Kingdom. It was not, as has been alleged, at Reinhardsbrunn that Victoria met Albert for the first time. They met first in London in May 1836, though after their marriage (1840) and after Albert's death (1861) Queen Victoria did visit Reinhardsbrunn in 1845 and 1862. Remains of the abbey church, the last significant remnant of the monastery, was demolished in 1855 and replaced by a smaller neo-romanesque palace chapel. In 1874, the effigies of the Landgraves of Thuringia, previously located in the Abbey Church, were moved to St. George's Church in Eisenach, where they remain today. In Duke Ernest II of Saxe-Cobourg-Gotha, Albert's older brother, died in the palace on August 22, 1893.

The Saxe-Coburg and Gotha family kept ownership until the end of World War II, after which it came into possession of the East German state. The house and estate were used for a short time by Soviet Red Army forces as a military hospital and then for various functions by the government of East Germany. The palace was opened as a high-end hotel, marketed towards West German tourists and dignitaries, in 1961. Listed in 1891 as one of the artistic landmarks of the duchy, and in 1980 as a landmark of national significance by East Germany, after German reunification the palace was registered in 1992 by the State of Thuringia as a historic monument. Together with its facilities and park, after the reunification, it passed from the Treuhandanstalt into the possession of Western hotel companies, then to a Weimar company, BOB Consult GmbH. None of these companies were able to secure funding to restore the property. BOB Consult and the property was purchased in 2008 for €12,000,000 by a Russian investment consortium, Rusintech, in a case of suspected money laundering. Rusintech did not maintain the palace, and it fell victim to decay and looting. The state of Thuringia performed urgent repairs to prevent structural failure, and in July 2018 legally repossessed it to ensure its safety, the first such action in the Federal Republic. Currently, the palace is being restored by the state of Thuringia.
