= Hirsau Abbey =

Benedictine abbey in Germany

Coordinates: 48°44′16″N 8°43′56″E

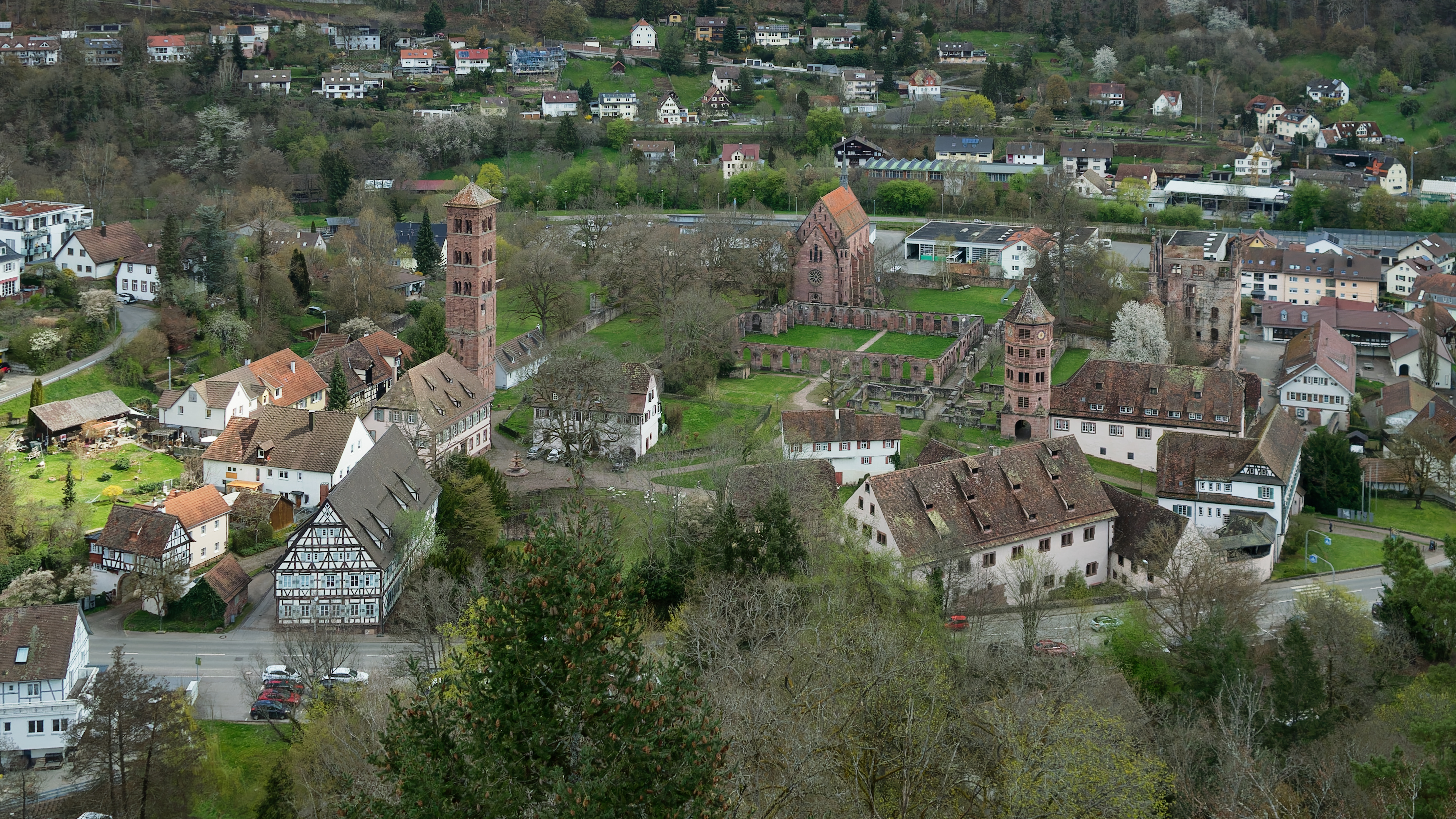
Aerial view of Hirsau Abbey

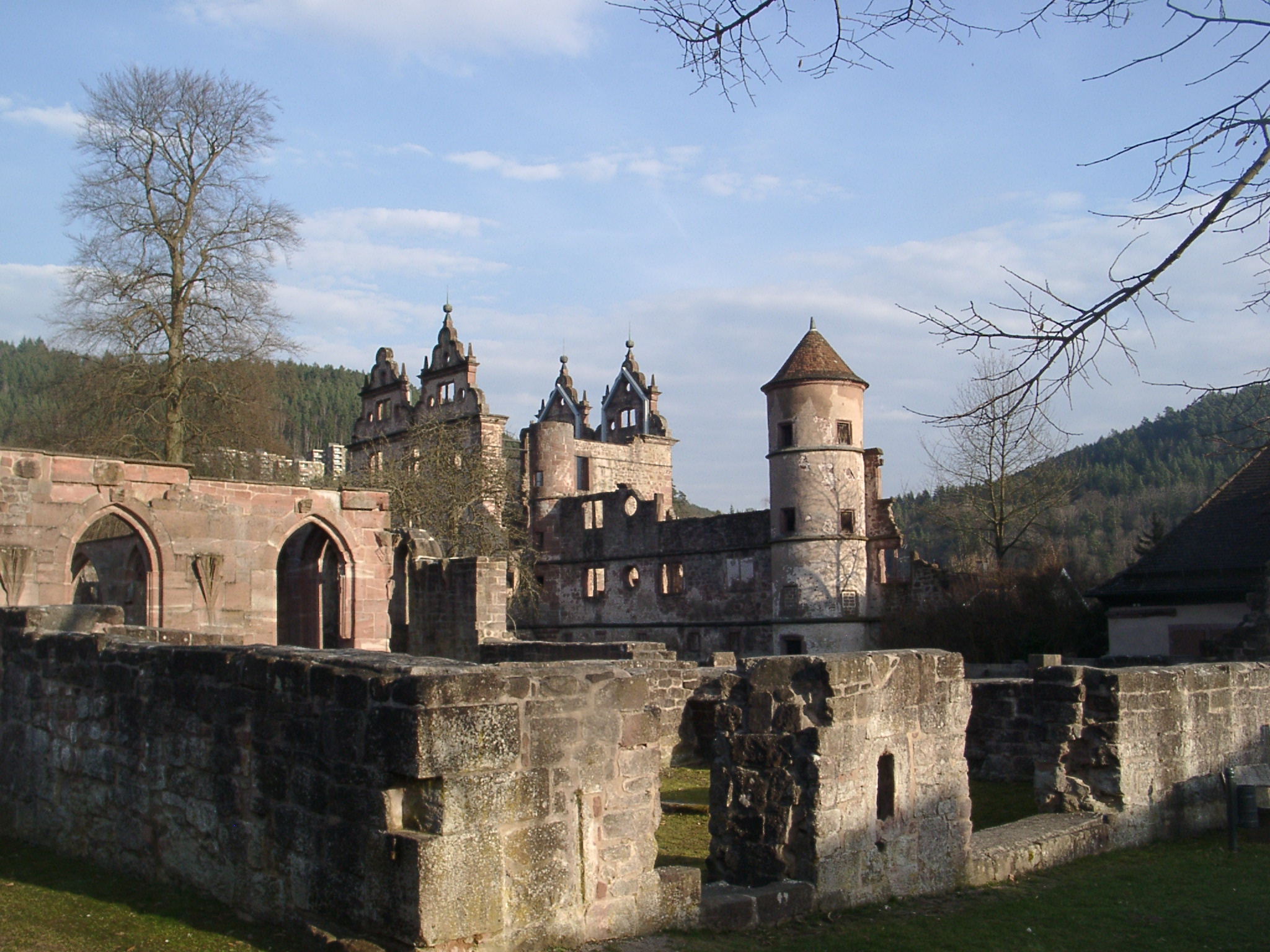
Ruins of Hirsau Abbey

Hirsau Abbey, formerly known as Hirschau Abbey, was once one of the most important Benedictine abbeys of Germany. It is located in the Hirsau borough of Calw on the northern slopes of the Black Forest mountain range, in the present-day state of Baden-Württemberg. In the 11th and 12th century, the monastery was a centre of the Cluniac Reforms, implemented as "Hirsau Reforms" in the German lands by William of Hirsau. The complex was devastated during the War of the Palatine Succession in 1692 and not rebuilt. The ruins served as a quarry for a period of time.

== History ==
=== St Aurelius ===
A Christian chapel at Hirsau dedicated to Saint Nazarius had already been erected in the late 8th century. The monastery itself was founded in about 830 by the Rhenish Franconian count Erlafried of Calw at the instigation of his son, Bishop Notting of Vercelli, who gave it the relics of Saint Aurelius of Riditio, an Armenian bishop who had died about 475, brought from Milan among other treasures.

They were first placed in the oratory of St. Nazarius' Chapel, while the monastery at Hirsau was being built on the count's estates. It was settled by a colony of fifteen monks descending from Fulda Abbey, disciples of Rabanus Maurus and Walafrid Strabo, under an abbot Liudebert or Lutpert. Count Erlafried endowed the new foundation with extended lands and other gifts, and made a solemn donation of the whole into the hands of Lutpert, on condition that the Rule of Saint Benedict should be observed. A first aisleless church, dedicated to Saint Aurelius, was not completed until 838, when it was consecrated by Archbishop Odgar of Mainz, who at the same time translated the relics from their temporary resting place to the new church.

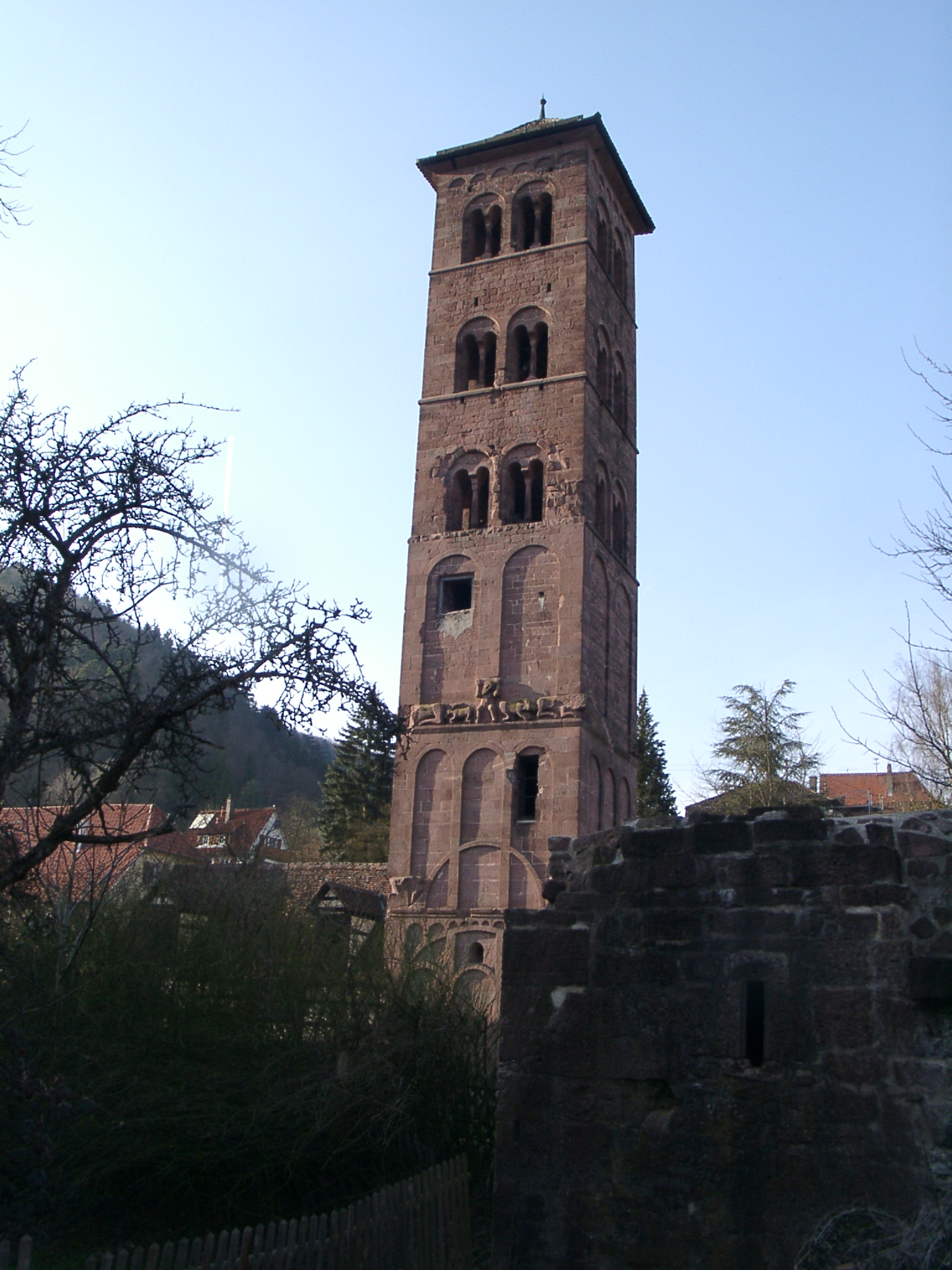
Belltower

Abbot Lutpert died in 853, having brought about a substantial increase both in the possessions of the abbey and in the number of the monks under his rule. Regular observance flourished under him and his successors and a successful monastic school was established. Over about a hundred and fifty years, under the care of the Counts of Calw, it enjoyed great prosperity, and became an important seat of learning. However, towards the end of the 10th century the ravages of pestilence, combined with the greed of its patrons and the laxity of the community, brought it to ruin. In 988 a severe plague devastated the neighbourhood and carried off sixty of the monks including the abbot, Hartfried. Only a dozen were left to elect a successor, and they divided into two parties. The more fervent chose one Conrad, whose election was confirmed by the Ruprecht, Bishop of Speyer, but some of the others, who favoured a more relaxed rule, elected an opposition abbot in the person of Eberhard, the cellarer. For some time the dispute ran high between the rival superiors and their respective followers. The Count of Calw supported the claims of Eberhard, but neither party would give way to the other and in the end the count brought in an armed force to settle the quarrel. The result was that the abbey was pillaged, the monks dispersed, and the valuable library destroyed. The count became master of the property and the abbey remained empty for over sixty years, during which time the buildings fell into a ruinous state.

In 1049 Pope Leo IX, uncle of Count Adalbert of Calw and grandson of the spoliator, came to Hirschau, and required Adalbert to restore the abbey. The count had the abbey church rebuilt in the style of a Roman basilica with an attached cloister. He renovated the premises, but so slowly that they were not refurbished until 1065, when the monastery was resettled by a dozen monks from the renowned Einsiedeln Abbey in Swabia, with Abbot Frederick at their head.

Church of St. Aurelius

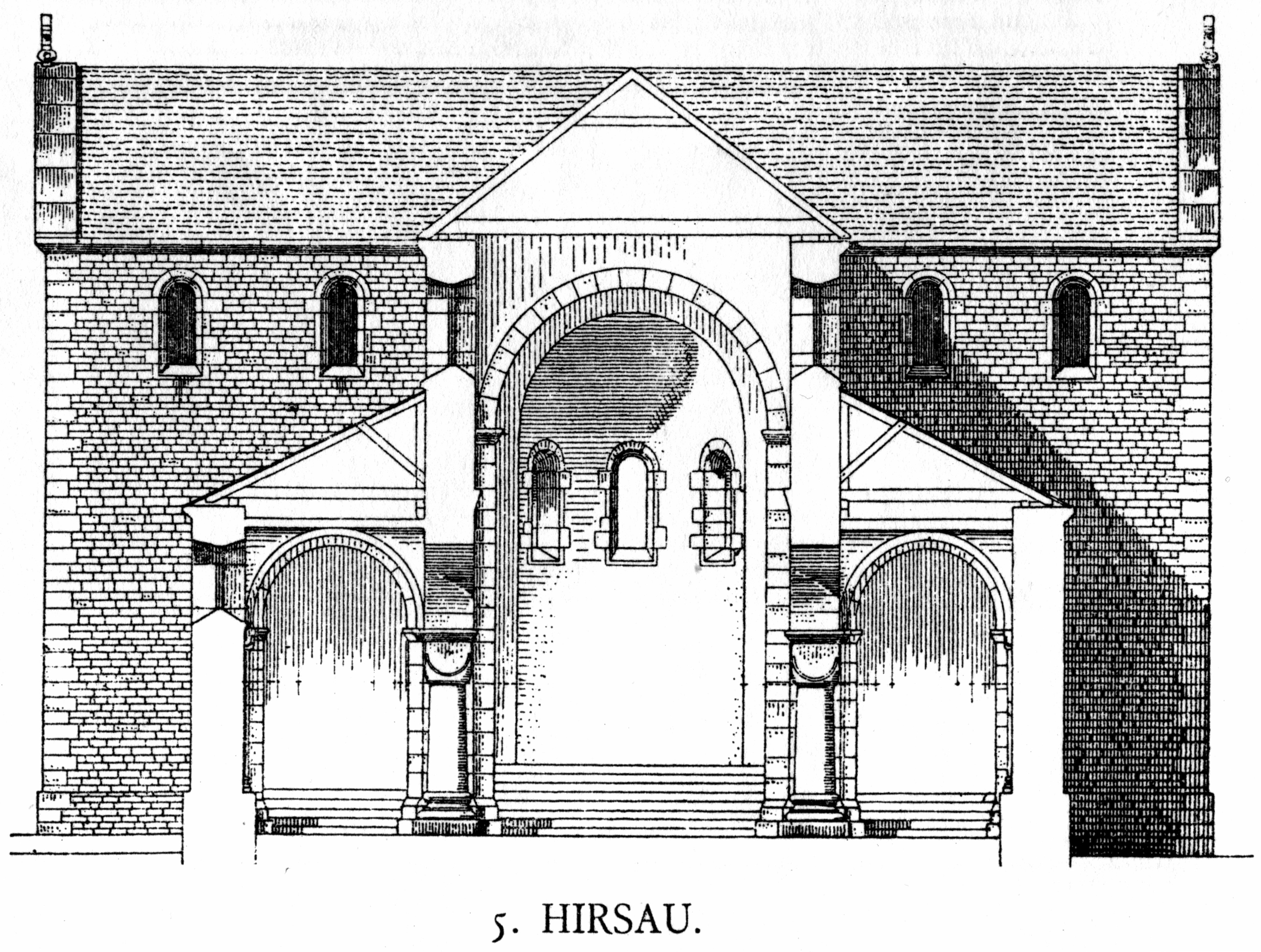
Dehio: section

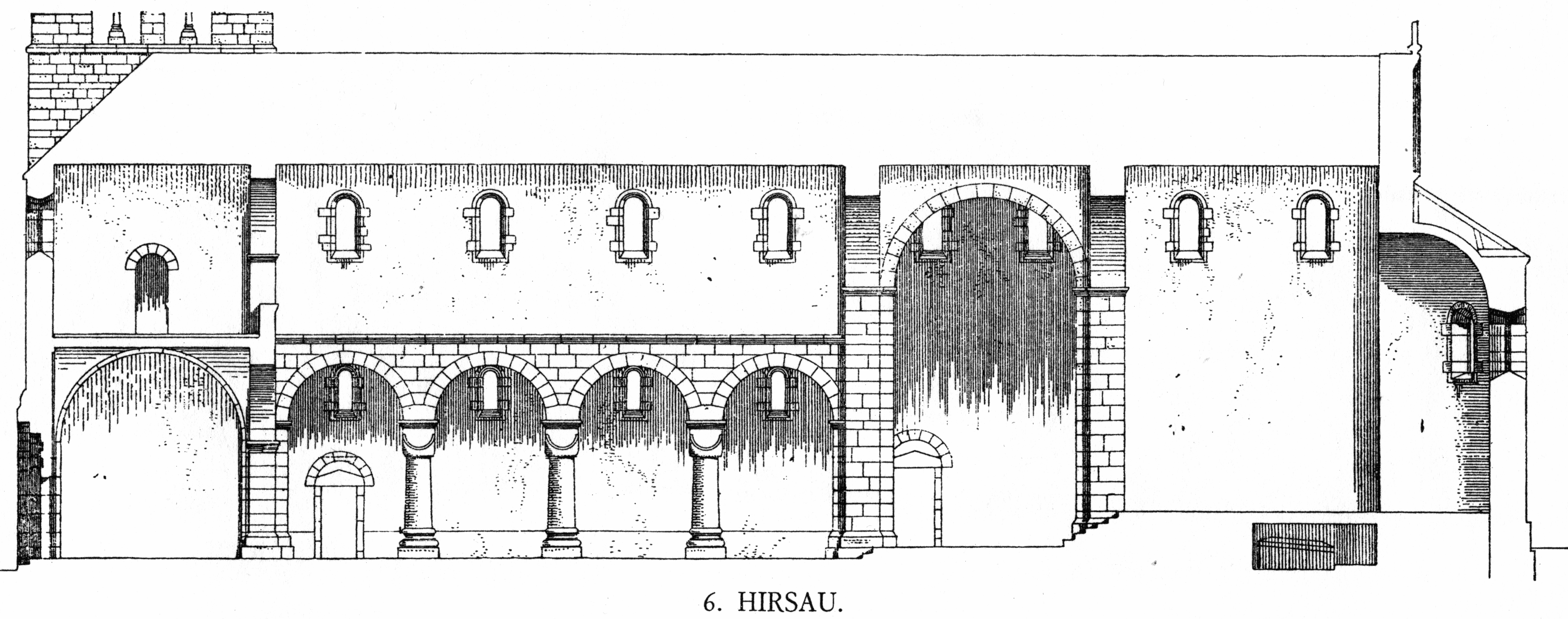
Dehio: section

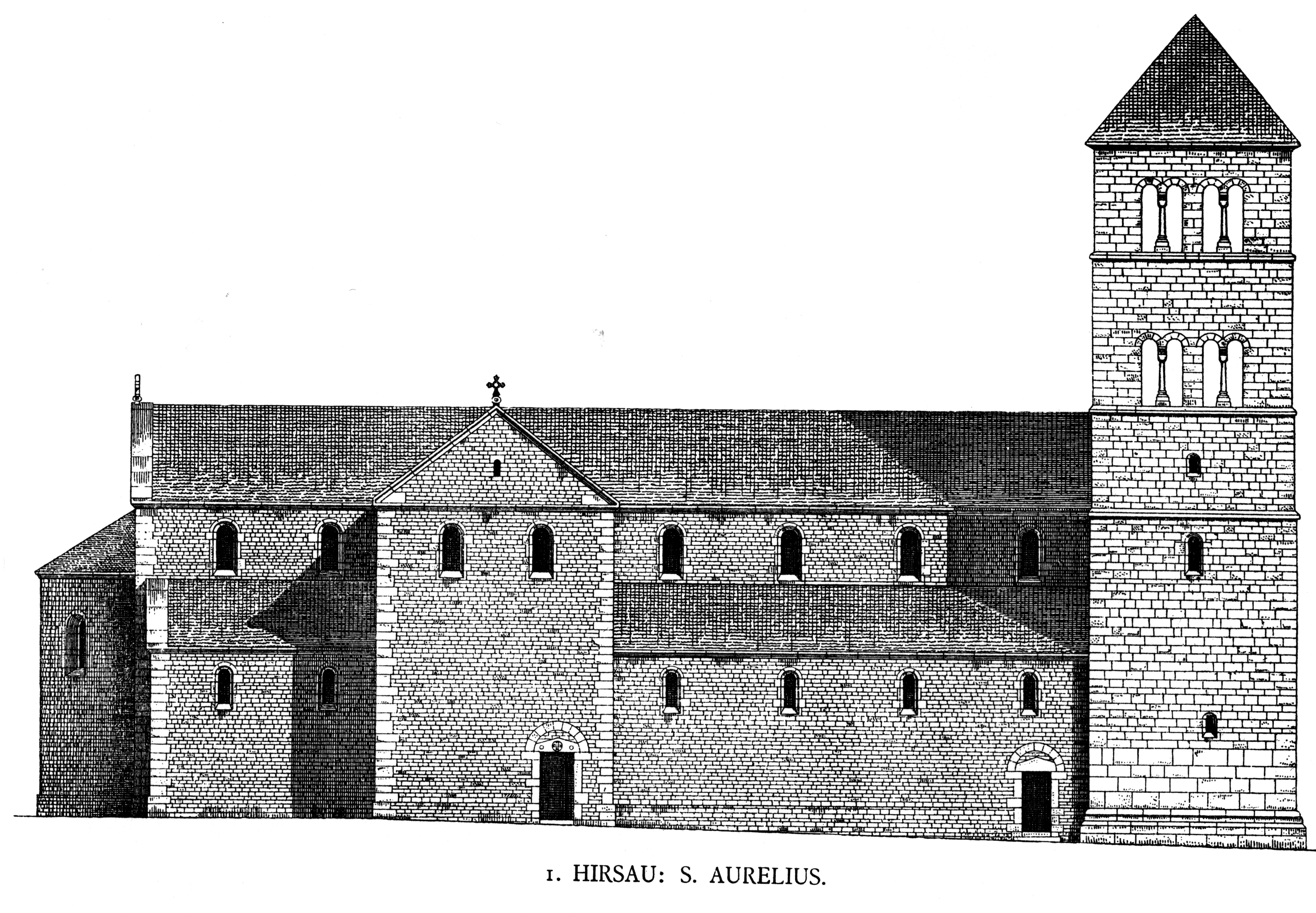
Dehio: elevation

=== Sts Peter and Paul ===
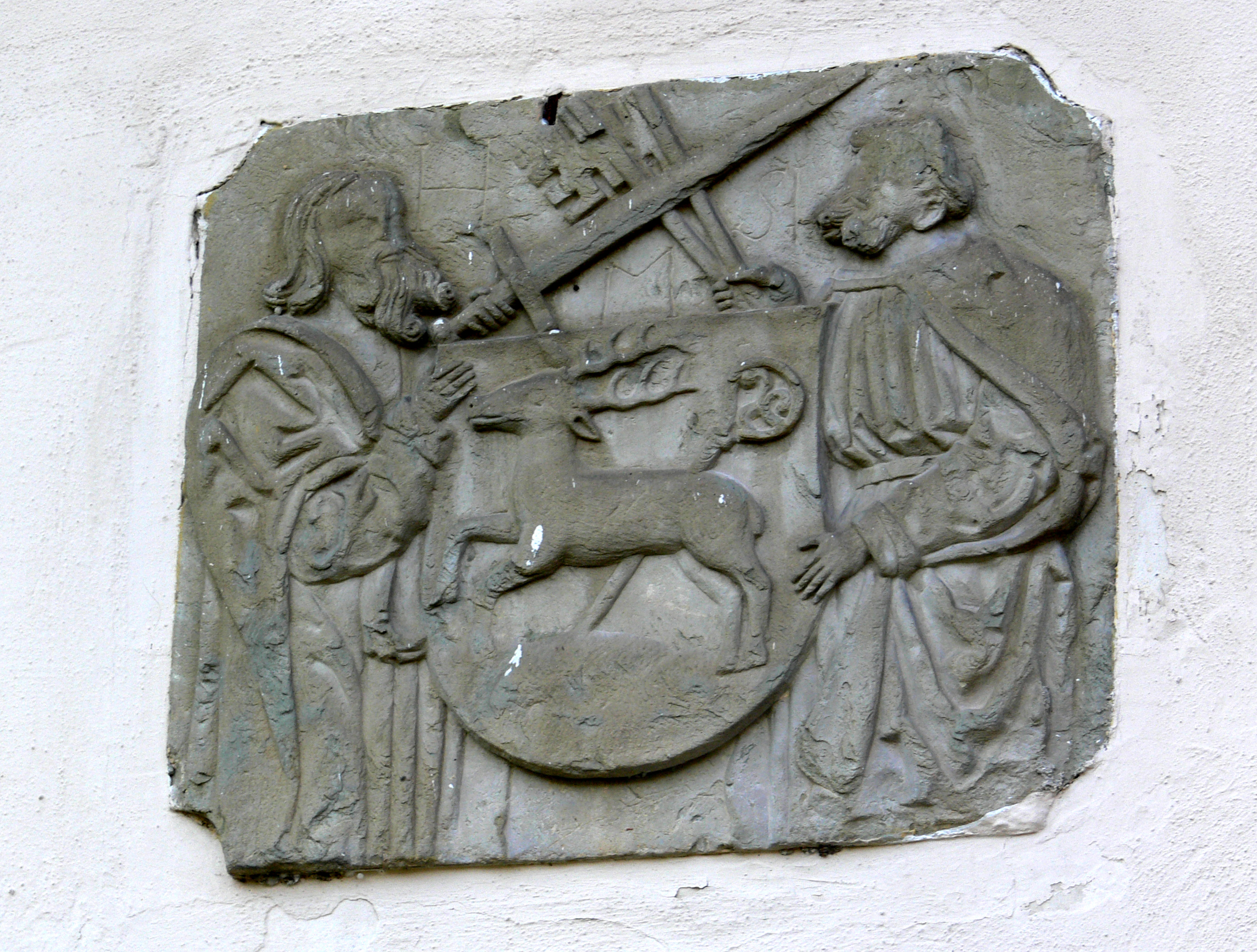
The Hirsch (deer) on the abbey's coat of arms

Abbot Frederick was deposed and the Counts of Calw dismissed his elected successor, Abbot Friedrich. They had a distant connection to Otto, Bishop of Regensburg. In May 1069, William, a monk of Saint Emmeram's Abbey was psent as successor. He immediately took over the management of the monastery, but refused to accept the abbatial benediction until after the death of his unjustly deposed predecessor in 1071. He was solemnly inaugurated by the Bishop of Speyer on Ascension Day in 1071.

When William came the condition of the monastery was far from satisfactory. The monks were living in cramped conditions, as the buildings were still incomplete and furthermore repeatedly affected by floods of the Nagold river. Count Adalbert still retained possession of some of the monastic property, together with a certain amount of unhelpful influence over the community, and regular discipline was very much relaxed. Abbot William's zeal and prudence by degrees remedied this unsatisfactory state of affairs and inaugurated a period of great prosperity, both spiritual and temporal. During the Investiture Controversy that shook the Holy Roman Empire, he secured the independence of the abbey from the Counts of Calw and placed its finances on a sound footing.

In 1089, monks from Hirsau founded Zwiefalten Abbey. William completed the buildings already begun and from 1082 afterwards greatly added to them, as the needs of the increasing community required, a new monastery complex on a high plateau on the opposite side of the Nagold river. The Sts Peter and Paul's abbey church, which was modelled on Cluny II finished about 981 under Abbot Majolus, was consecrated in 1091. The convent followed the next year, when it moved into the adjacent new monastic compound designed according to the Plan of Saint Gall, while old St Aurelius was converted into a priory. William also refounded the monastic school for which the abbey had formerly been famous throughout Germany.

But the abbot's greatest work, perhaps, and that for which his name is best remembered, was the reformation that he effected within the community itself. Cluny was then at the height of its fame and William sent some of his monks there to learn the Cluniac customs and rule, after which the Cluniac discipline was introduced at Hirsau. By his Constitutiones Hirsaugienses, the Ordo Hirsaugiensis, was formed. Known as the Hirsau Reforms, the adoption of this rule revitalised Benedictine monasteries throughout Germany, such as those of Zwiefalten, Blaubeuren Petershausen, Saint Peter and Saint George in the Black Forest in Swabia, as well as the Thuringian monastery of Reinhardsbrunn, Franconian Comburg and St. Paul's Abbey in the Lavanttal in Carinthia. Hirsau priories were located at Reichenbach and Schönrain, in Bavarian Fischbachau and Thuringian Paulinzella.

A friend and correspondent of Pope Gregory VII and Archbishop Anselm of Canterbury, William took active part in the politico-ecclesiastical controversies of his time. He was also author of inter alia the treatise De musica et tonis, as well as the Philosophicarum et astronomicarum institutionum libri iii. The abbot then wrote his well-known "Consuetudines Hirsaugienses" which for several centuries remained the standard of monastic observance. Under William monks were sent out from Hirsau to reform other German monasteries on the same lines, and from it seven new monasteries were founded. The numbers of the community increased to 150 under his rule, manual labour and the copying of manuscripts forming an important part of their occupations. Numerous exemptions and other privileges were obtained from time to time from emperors and popes.

In the twelfth century the autocratic rule of Abbot Manegold caused for a time some internal dissensions and a consequent decline of strict discipline, but the vigorous efforts of several abbots checked the decadence, and temporarily re-established the stricter observance. About the end of the 12th century Hirsau Abbey was again very perceptibly on the decline both materially and morally. It never afterwards again rose into importance.

In the fifteenth century, however, the famous "Customs" gradually became little more than a dead letter. Wolfram, the thirty-eighth abbot (1428–1460), introduced the contemporary Melk Reform. A few years later Hirsau adopted the Constitutions of Bursfelde Abbey and became part of the Bursfelde Congregation. Wolfram's successor, Bernhard, carried on the work of revival, freed the abbey from its debts, restored the monastic buildings, and also reformed several other monasteries.

In the days of Abbot John III (1514–1556) Hirsau fell on hard times: the Protestant Reformation began to make its influence felt, and after a brief period of struggle, the abbey, through the involvement of Duke Ulrich of Württemberg, passed into Lutheran hands, though still maintaining its monastic character. In consequence of the Reformation it was secularized in 1558. In 1630 it became Catholic again for a short time, but after the Peace of Westphalia (1648) it once more came under the control of the Dukes of Württemberg and another series of Lutheran abbots presided over it.

The community eventually came to an end and Christoph, Duke of Württemberg established a Protestant boarding school at the former monastery. His son, Louis III, Duke of Württemberg built a hunting lodge on the site of the abbot's house. Hirsau Abbey was finally destroyed during the Nine Years' War by French troops under General Lieutenant Mélac in 1692.

== Present day ==
The Church of St. Aurelius was renovated in 1954. The relics of St. Aurelius were brought back from Zwiefalten and the church restored as a place of worship.

In 1991, the city of Calw and the Badisches Landesmuseum founded the Monastery Museum Hirsau in a building once part of the monastery complex.

== Burials at Hirsau Abbey ==
- Berthold II, Duke of Carinthia

== Gallery ==
Monastery

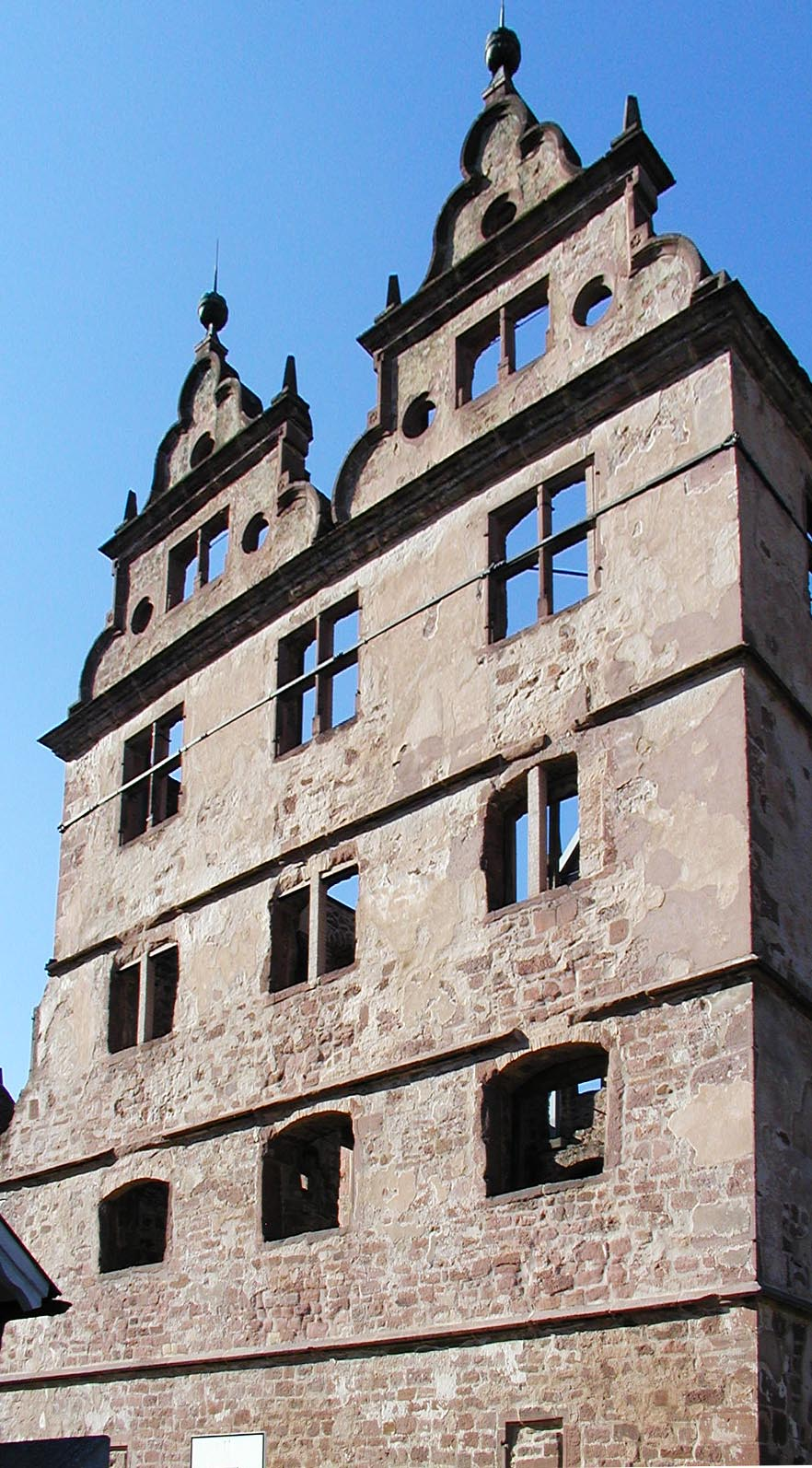
Hunting lodge

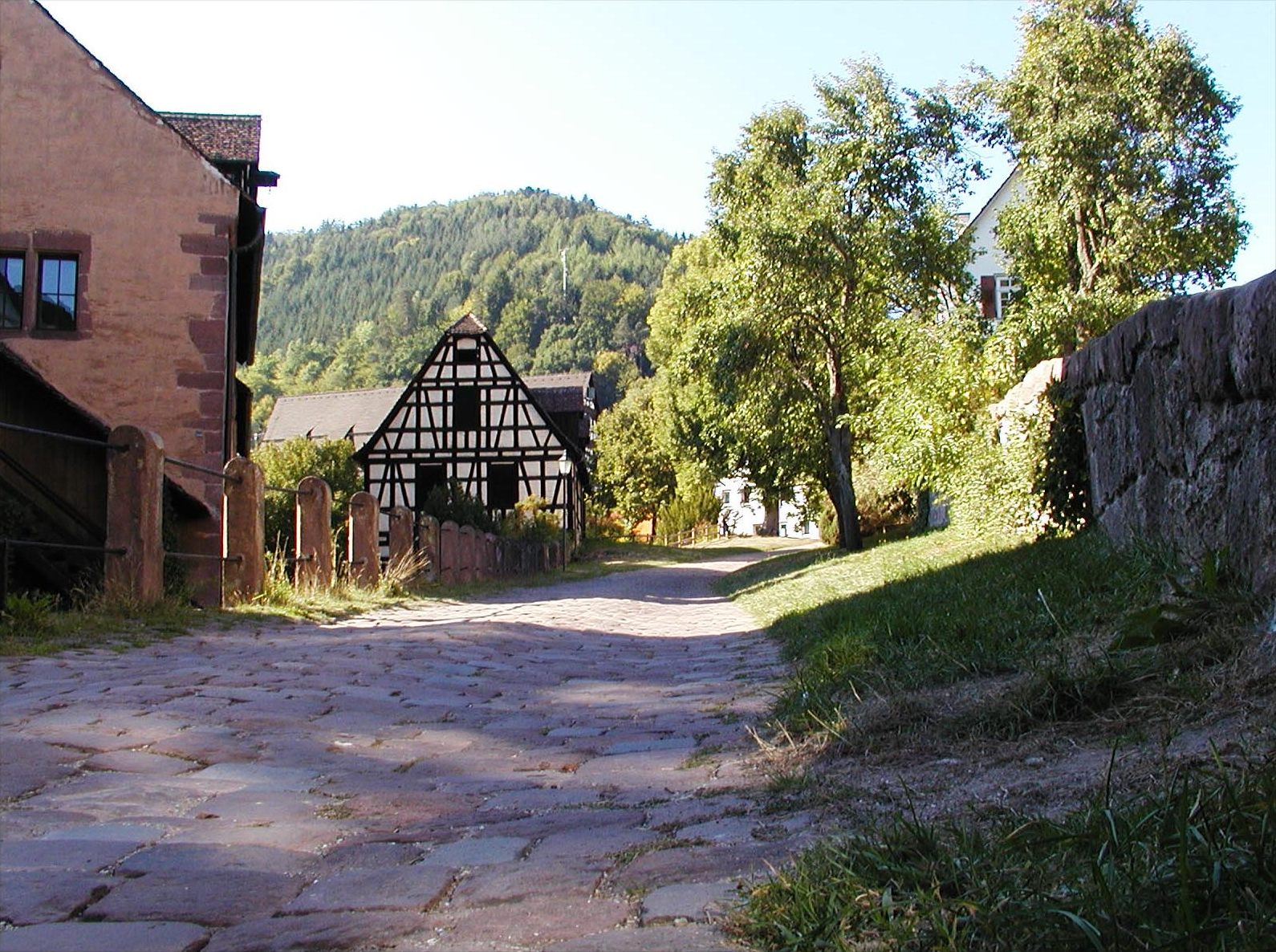
General view

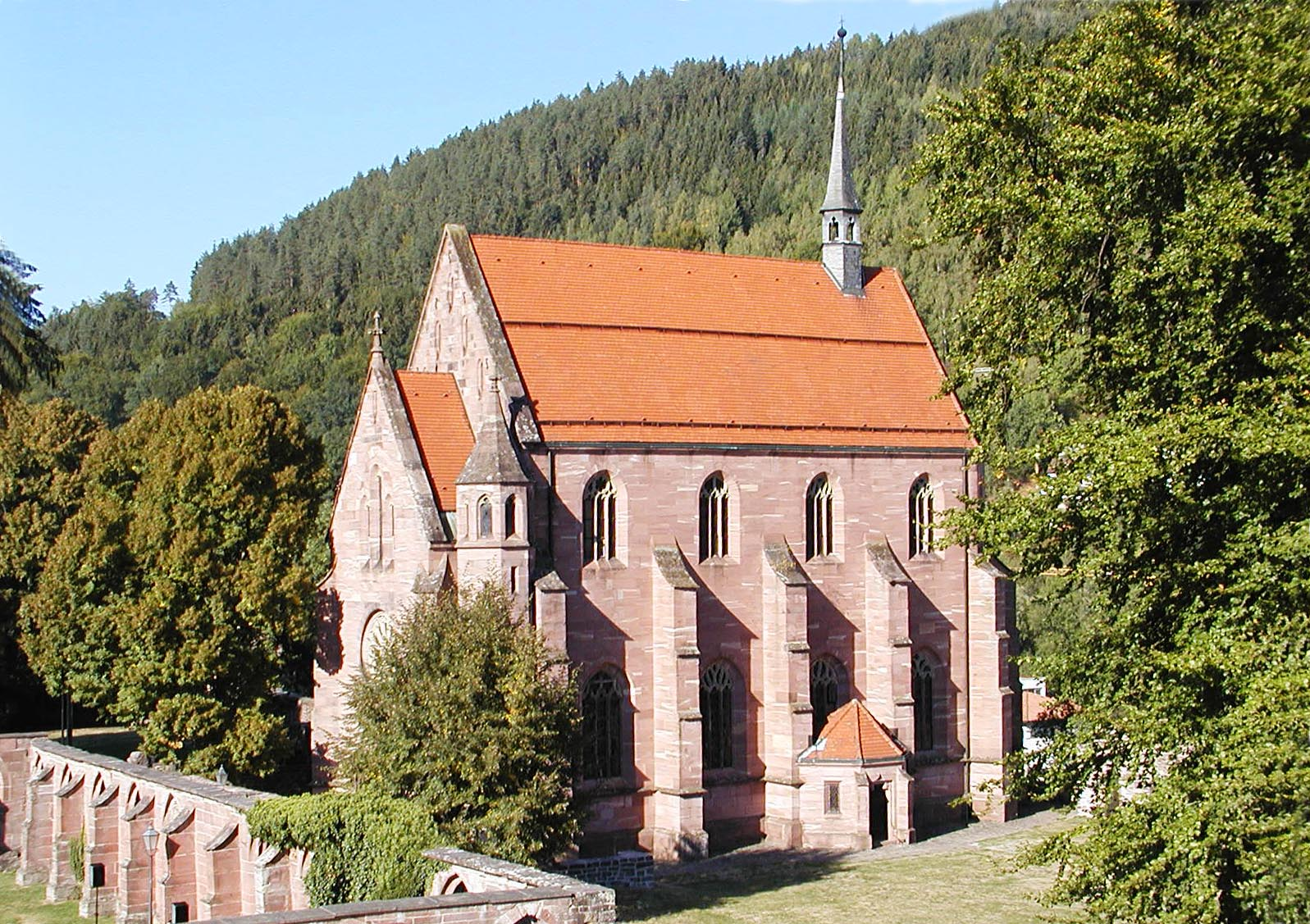
Lady chapel

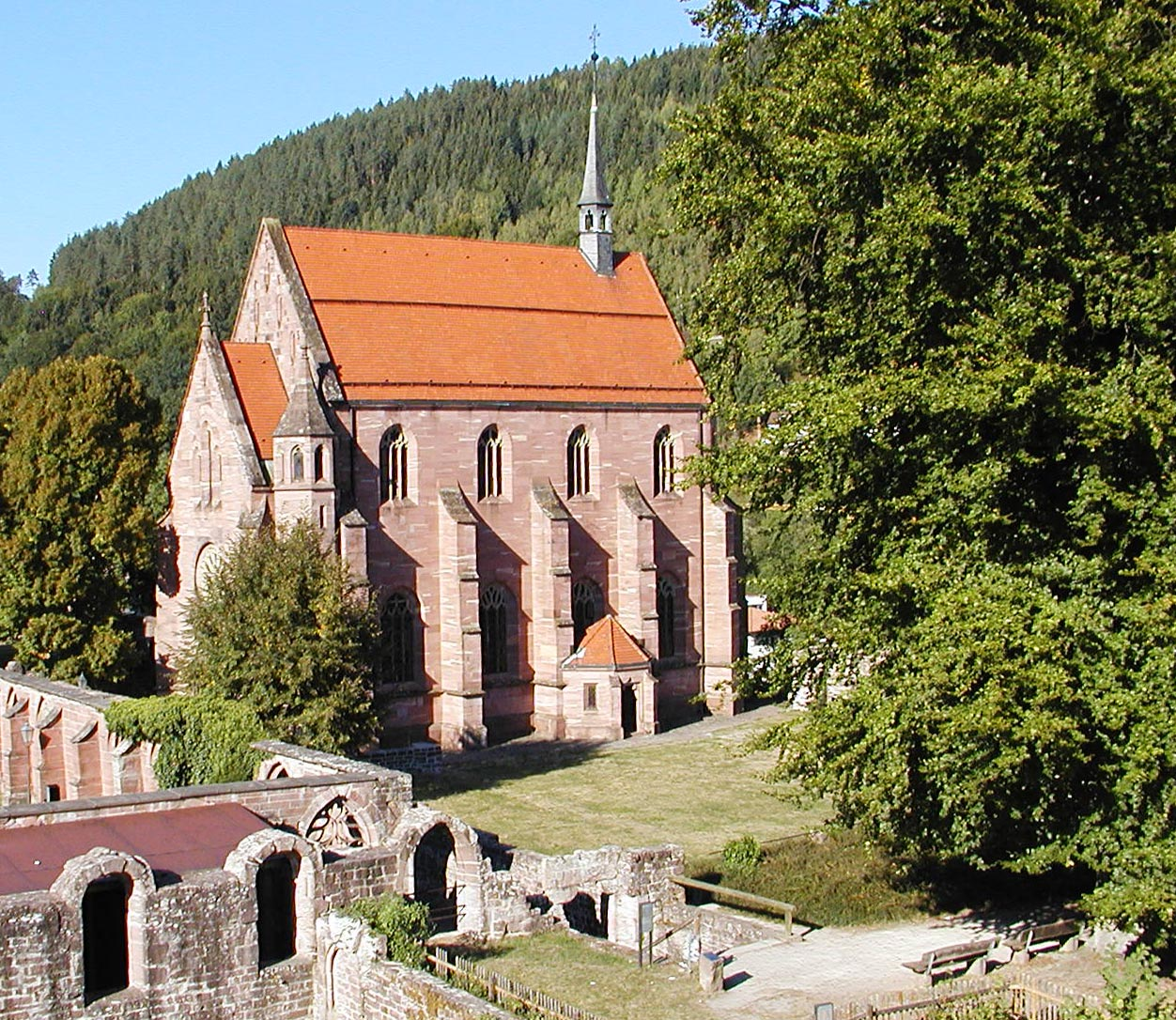
Lady chapel

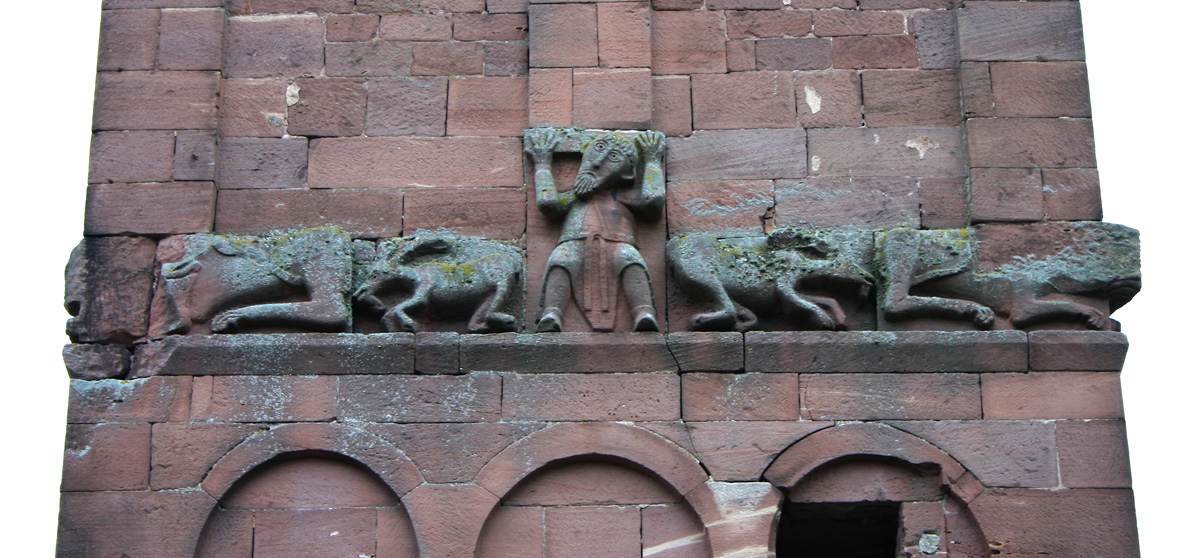
Frieze

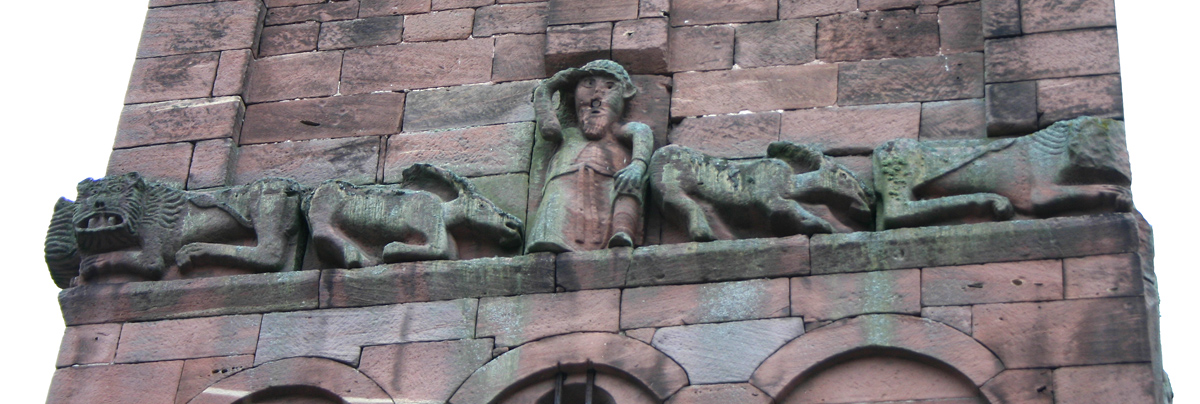
Frieze

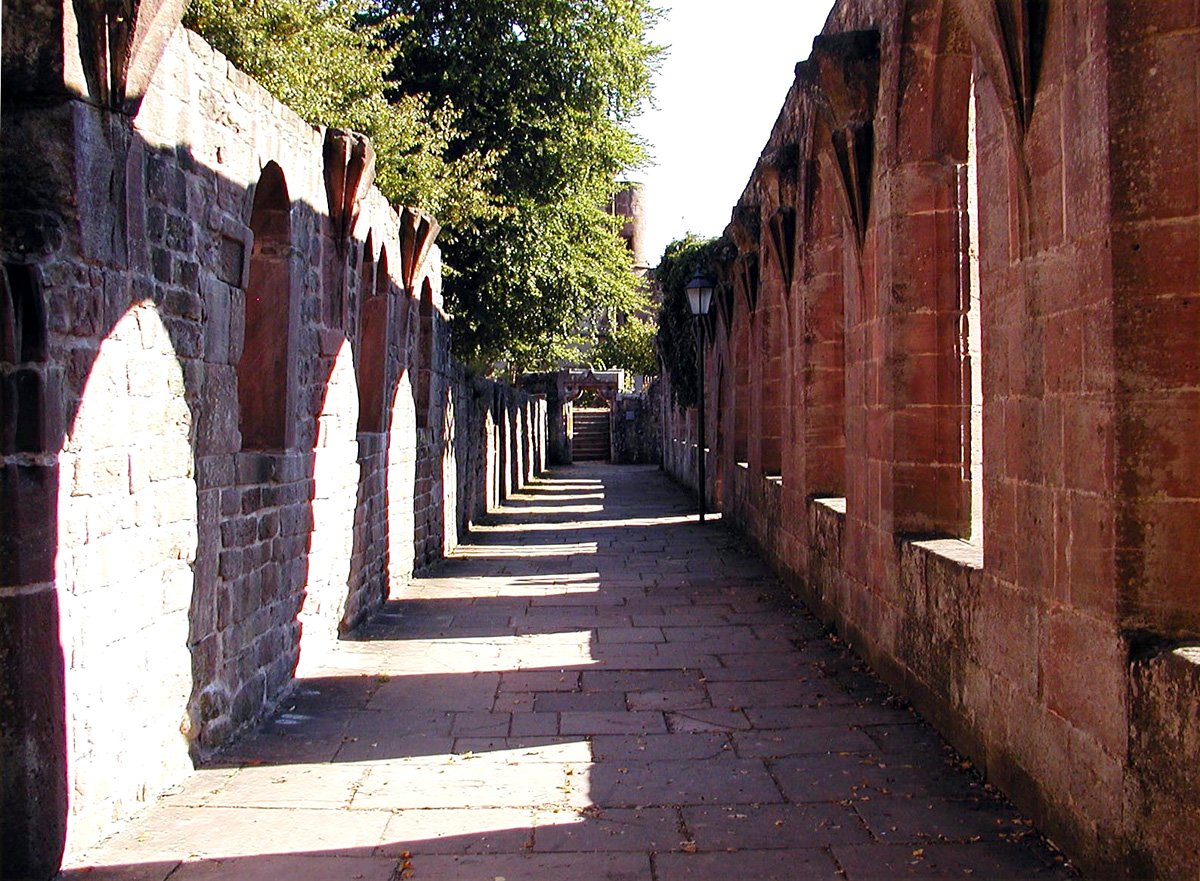
Cloister

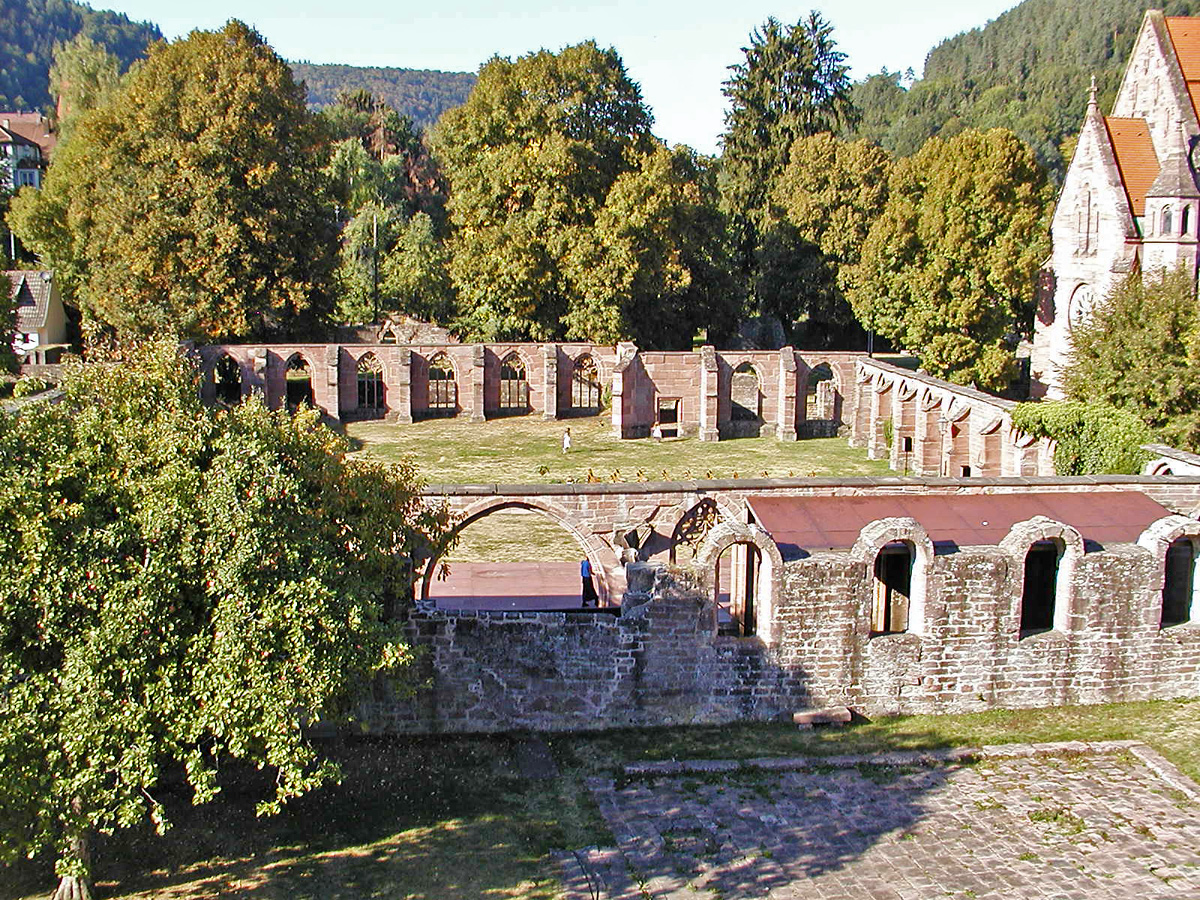
Cloister

== Sources ==
- Herrbach-Schmidt, B., Westermann, C.: Klostermuseum Hirsau: Führer durch des Zweigmuseum des Badischen Landesmuseums. Badisches Landesmuseum, Karlsruhe(1998), ISBN 3-923132-69-7
- Teschauer, O.: Kloster Hirsau, Ein Kurzführer, Calwer Druckzentrum,(1991), ISBN 3-926802-10-3
- Würfel, M.: Lernort, Kloster Hirsau. Einhorn-Verlag, Eduard Dietenberger GmbH (1998), ISBN 3-927654-65-5
- The Chronicon Hirsaugiense, or, as it is called in the later edition, Annales Hirsaugienses of Abbot Trithemius by Trithemius, the celebrated Abbot of Spanheim, who had access to its archives before they were dispersed (Basel, 1559; St Gall, 1690), although containing much that is merely legendary, is nevertheless an important source of information up to the year 1503, not only on the affairs of this monastery, but also on the early history of Germany.
- The Codex Hirsaugiensis was edited by A. F. Gfrorer and printed at Stuttgart in 1843.
- Baer, 1897. Die Hirsauer Bauschule. Freiburg.
- Giseke, 1883. Die Hirschauer während des Investiturstreits. Gotha.
- Helmsdorfer, 1874. Forschungen zur Geschichte des Abts Wilhelm von Hirschau. Göttingen
- Besides the "Customs" already referred to, William of Hirschau left a treatise "De Musica et Tonis" (printed by Gerbert, "Script. Eccles.", and also by Migne, P. L., CL).
- Klaiber, C.H., 1886. Das Kloster Hirschau. Tübingen.
- Steck, 1844. Das Kloster Hirschau
- Süssmann, 1903. Forschungen zur Geschichte des Klosters Hirschau. Halle.
- Weizsäcker, 1898. Führer durch die Geschichte des Klosters Hirschau. Stuttgart
