= Kesselbach (Zwiefalter Aach) =

River in Germany

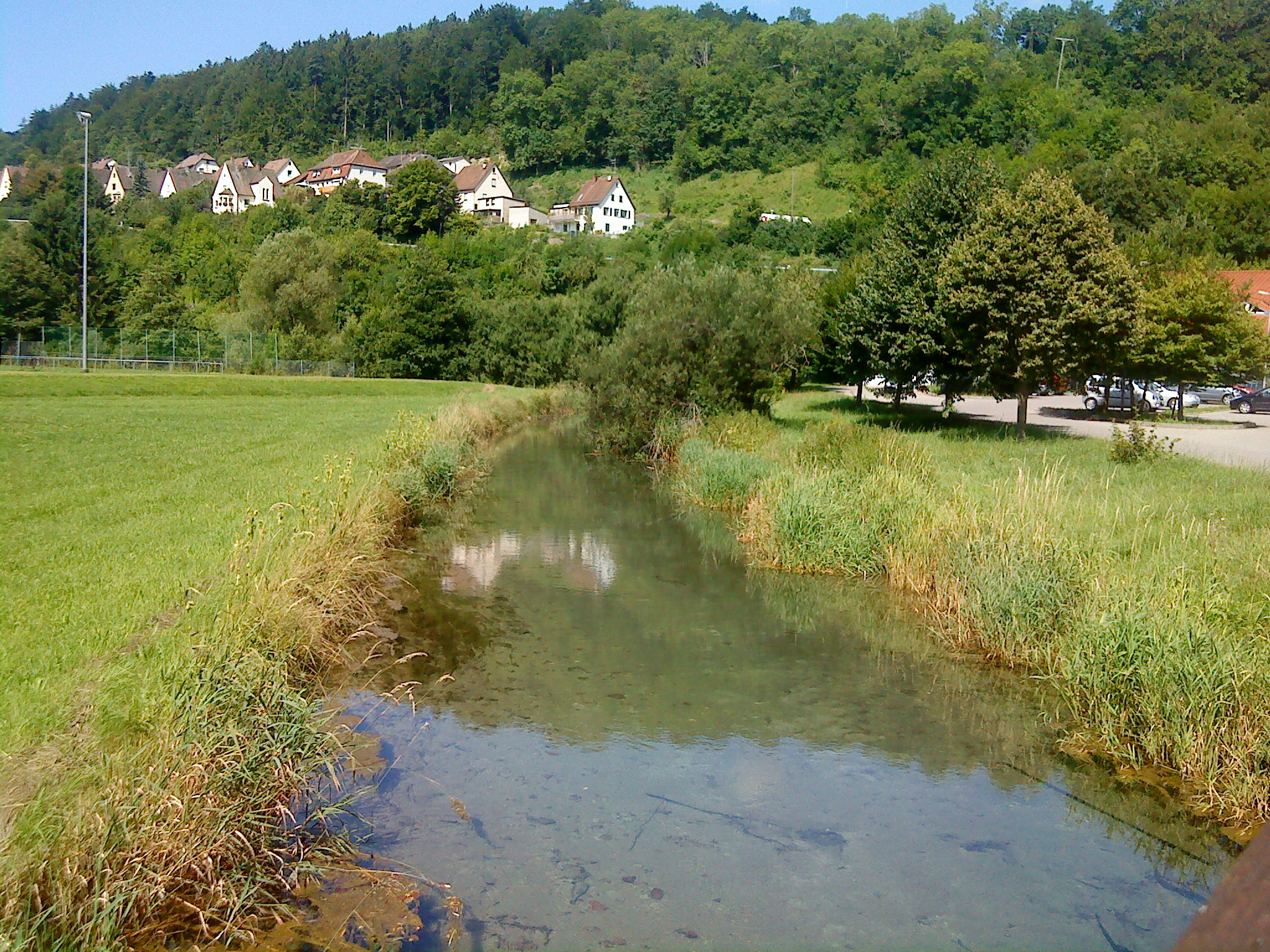

Location
- Country: Germany
- States: Baden-Württemberg

Physical characteristics
- Mouth
  - location: Zwiefalter Aach
  - coordinates: 48.2314°N 9.4607°E

Basin features
- Progression: Zwiefalter Aach→ Danube→ Black Sea

Kesselbach is a short river of Baden-Württemberg, Germany. It flows into the Zwiefalter Aach in Zwiefalten.

== See also ==
- List of rivers of Baden-Württemberg
