= Hasenbach =

Hasenbach may refer to:

- Hasenbach (Zwiefalter Aach), a river of Baden-Württemberg, Germany, tributary of the Zwiefalter Aach
- Zajčje Polje, German Hasenbach, a settlement in southern Slovenia
- Hasenbach, a division of Reichshof, a municipality of North Rhine-Westphalia, Germany
- Hasenbach, a division of Neunkirchen-Seelscheid, a municipality of North Rhine-Westphalia, Germany
