= Weißjura Formation =

Geologic formation in Germany

- Stratigraphic range: Jurassic
- Type: Geologic formation

Lithology
- Primary: Limestone

Location
- Region: Swabian Jura, Baden-Württemberg
- Country: Germany

The Weißjura Formation is a Limestone geologic formation located in the Swabian Jura (Swabian Alps) range, Baden-Württemberg, Germany.

Wimsener Höhle is a Karst cave in the formation. The Zwiefalter Aach river flows out through the water cave.

It preserves fossils dating back to the Jurassic period.

== See also ==
- Jurassic Germany
- List of fossiliferous stratigraphic units in Germany
