= Saint Ernest =

German saint

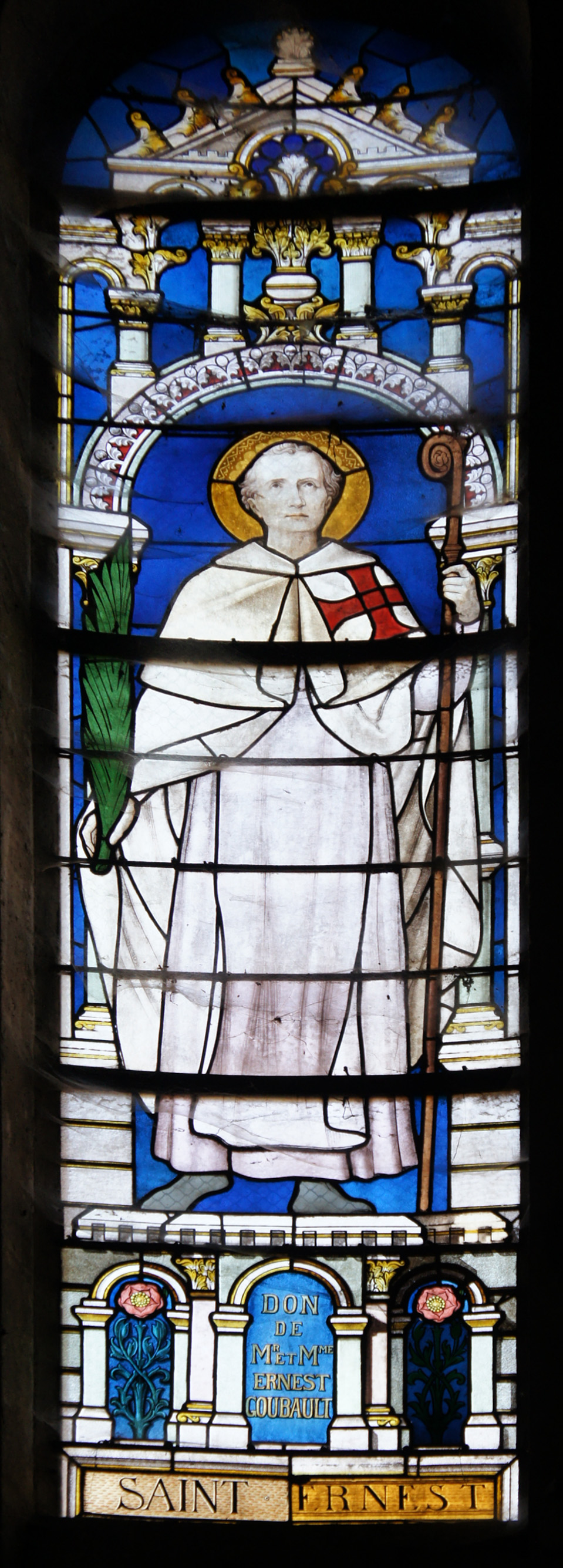
- Ernest in a stained glass window of the Church of St Peter and Paul, Épernay

Abbot of the abbey of Zwiefalten
- Died: 1148 AD; Mecca
- Venerated in: Catholic Church
- Major shrine: Zwiefalten Abbey
- Feast: November 7

Saint Ernest (died 1148) was the abbot of the Benedictine Zwiefalten Abbey in Germany from 1141 to 1146. He participated in the Second Crusade (which was fought by Christians between 1146 and 1149 to defend the Holy Land following the Turkish atabeg Zengi's capture of the strategically important city of Edessa in 1144).

== Life ==
Ernest is a Germanic name meaning severe. Not much is known about Saint Ernest's life. He was born of a noble family in Steisslingen, Germany, and along with his two brothers became important patrons of reformed monasteries in Swabia. How and when Ernst entered the religious life is not clear. A donation to Zwiefalten by the three brothers from 1131 suggests they might have taken monastic vows as early as that time, while the later Vita Ernusti claims he was a child oblate. Because the Hirsau rule, which Zwiefalten followed, did not permit child oblates, this later tradition is likely invented.

== The Crusade ==
When St. Bernard called for participation in the Second Crusade to defend the Latin Kingdom and roll back Zengi's advances in Syria, the German king Conrad III, along with many other nobles and churchmen, including Ernest, responded. Ernest attached himself to a contingent of pilgrims and fighters led by the king's brother, bishop Otto of Freising. The crusade was not successful. The German armies suffered massive attrition on their march through Asia Minor (Anatolia) and those few who did make it to join the other Crusader forces led by the French king Louis VII in the Holy Land eventually retreated from an ill-considered siege of Damascus in July 1148 and returned home in ignominy.

Otto of Freising's group progressed along the southwestern coastal route across Anatolia from Ephesus to Laodicea before making for the coast and securing naval passage to Antioch. They suffered nearly the whole way from severe hunger and other deprivations, including ambushes by Turkish forces in which numerous Christians were taken prisoner or killed.

== Martyrdom ==
St. Ernest himself did not reach Jerusalem. There are no eyewitness or near-contemporary accounts of what happened to him, but a later twelfth-century hagiography, the Vita S. Ernusti abbatis, written at Zwiefalten, describes how he was taken captive by Saracens in an ambush, and then, along with 40 other Christian prisoners selected for their youth and comeliness, brought to Mecca and presented to the "king of Persia" [Ghiyath ad-Din Mas'ud or Atsiz?]. In the vita's account, the king orders Ernest and the other Christians to venerate his pagan gods, but Ernest steadfastly refuses. Brutally tortured, he is brought once again before the idols and told to worship them. Instead, he stones the idols with rocks, smashing them to pieces. Ernest is then killed by having his viscera drawn out of his navel and wound around a rod.

The story contains a number of fanciful elements, but reproduces in particular the popular medieval image of Muslims as idolaters, a myth that Otto of Freising himself went to some lengths to dispel in his chronicle On the History of the Two Cities.
