= Hasenbach (Zwiefalter Aach) =

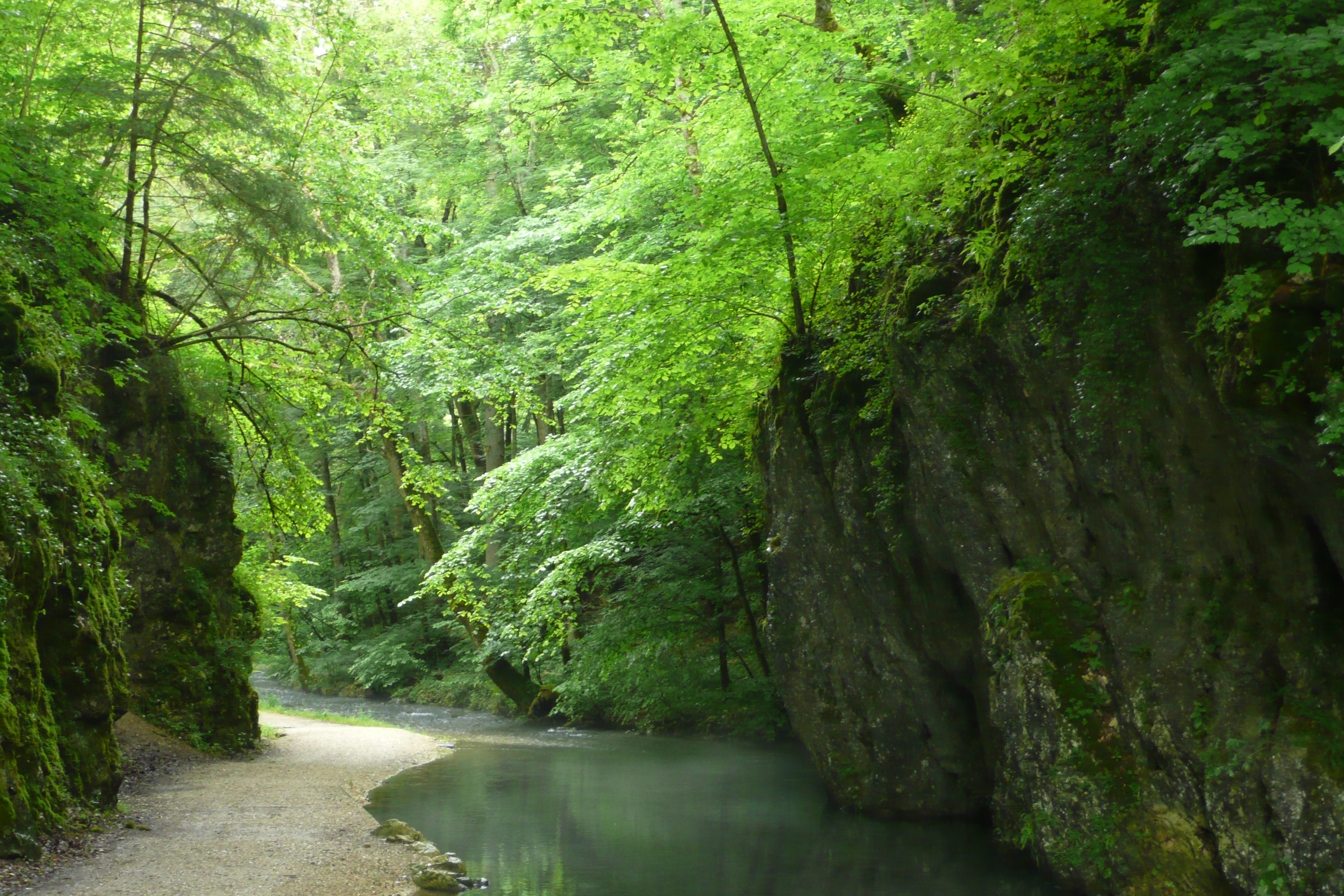

Location
- Country: Germany
- States: Baden-Württemberg

Physical characteristics
- Mouth
  - location: Zwiefalter Aach
  - coordinates: 48.2564°N 9.4484°E

Basin features
- Progression: Zwiefalter Aach→ Danube→ Black Sea

Hasenbach is a small river in the Swabian Alb, Baden-Württemberg, Germany. Its source is a karst spring. It flows into the Zwiefalter Aach close to where this river emerges from the water cave Wimsener Höhle.

== See also ==
- List of rivers of Baden-Württemberg
