= Franz Joseph Spiegler =

German painter

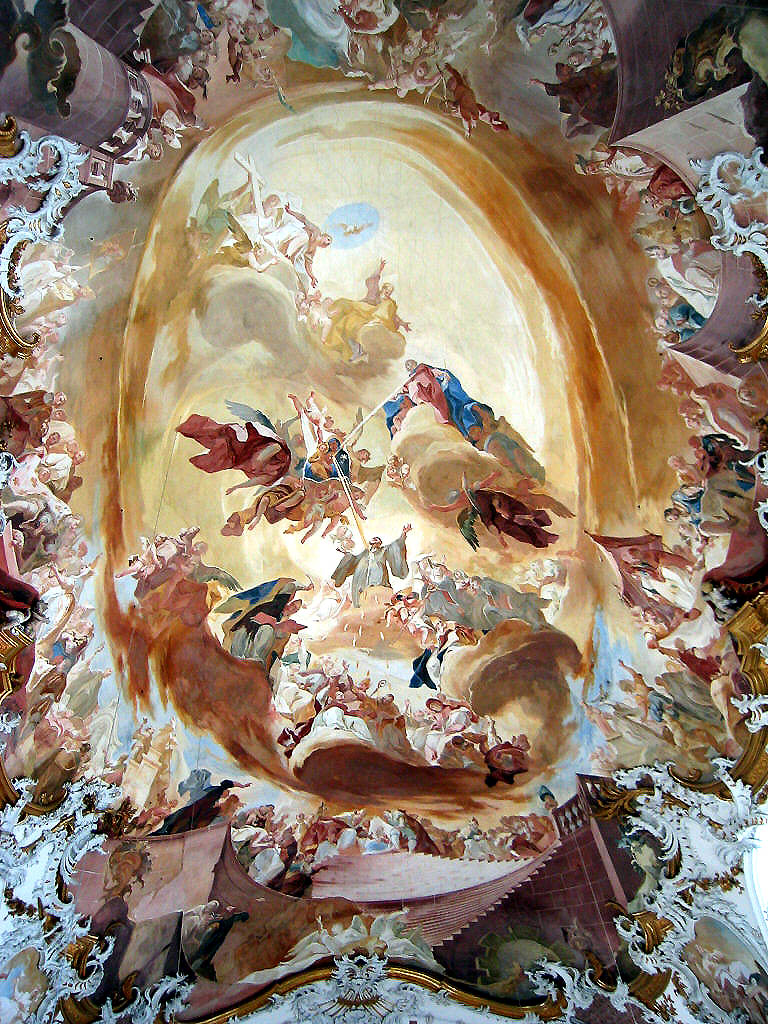
- Ceiling frescoes in Zwiefalten Münster
- Born: April 15, 1691; Wangen im Allgäu
- Died: April 15, 1757 (aged 66); Konstanz
- Known for: Painting

Franz Joseph Spiegler (5 April 1691 – 15 April 1757) was a German Baroque painter. He is best known for his frescoes, which decorate many of the churches and monasteries along the Upper Swabian Baroque Route. The frescoes in the Zwiefalten Abbey are considered his masterpiece.

== Life and work ==
Spiegler was born the Free Imperial City of Wangen im Allgäu, the son of a district court attorney. After the death of his father in 1692, his mother married the painter Adam Joseph Dollmann, a member of an old patrician family in Wangen. This was Spiegler's introduction to the arts.

Around 1710 Spiegler began training as a painter in Munich under the tutelage of his great-uncle, the Bavarian court painter Johann Kaspar Sing. During the course of his studies, Spiegler also became acquainted with the historical painting in vogue with the Dutch painters of the time.

From 1723 to 1725 Spiegler painted frescoes in the Ottobeuren Abbey that show the strong influence of the Italian painter Jacopo Amigoni (1682–1752). Later he also created frescoes and oil paintings for numerous monasteries, churches, and castles in the regions of Upper Swabia, Lake Constance, the Black Forest, and the Upper Rhine. In 1757 Spiegler died in Konstanz.

== Major works ==
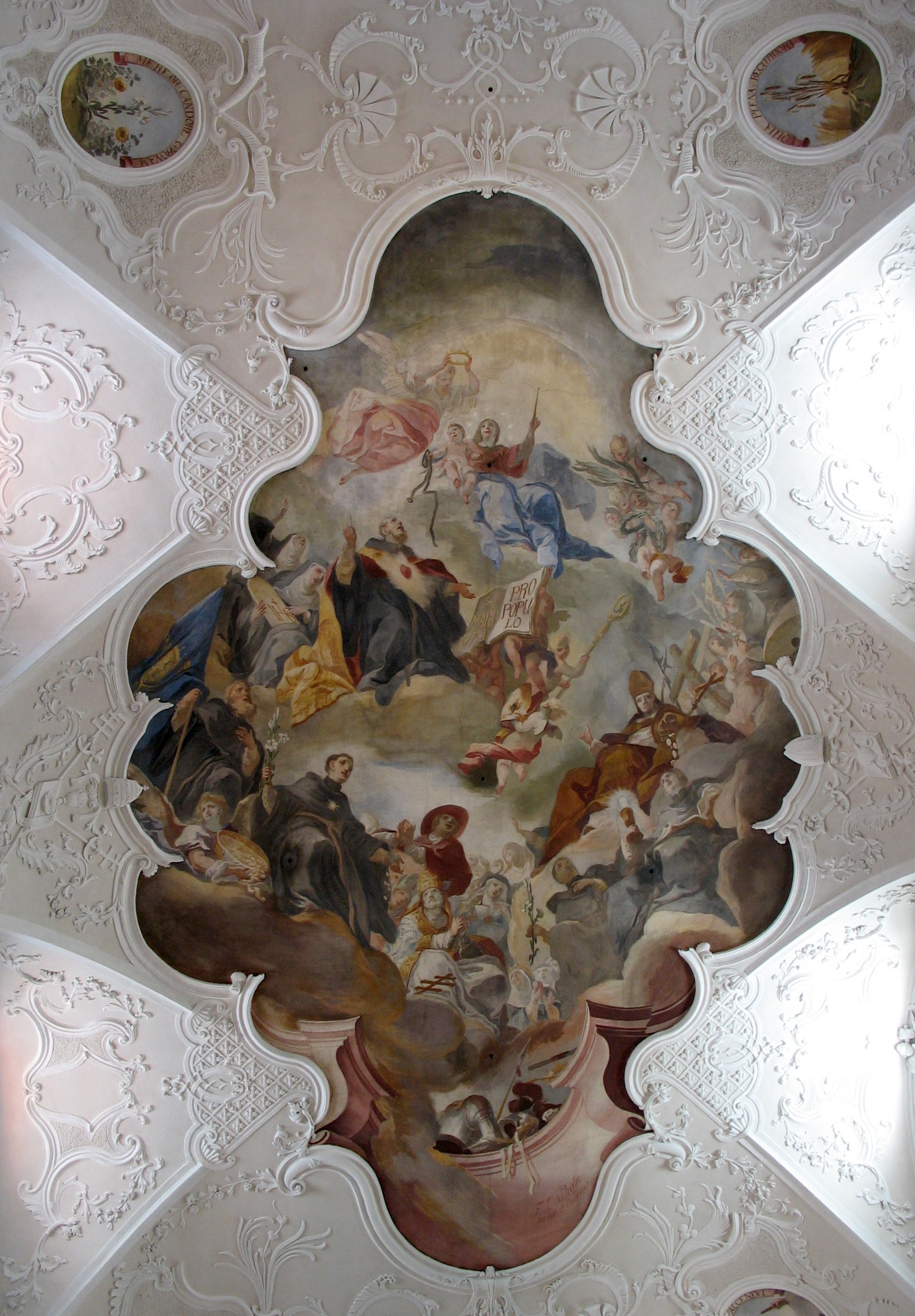
Ceiling fresco depicting St. Augustine's reception into heaven from the Augustinian Church of the Holy Trinity in Konstanz

=== Baden-Württemberg ===
- Altheim, Biberach (near Riedlingen)—Parish Church of St. Martin (1747) (frescoes and three oil paintings)
- Bad Säckingen—Convent Church of St. Fridolin (1753–1754) (frescoes)
- Bonndorf— Schloss Bonndorf (1726) (fresco)
- Gossenzugen—Chapel (ca. 1749) (frescoes)
- Konstanz—Augustinian Church of the Holy Trinity (Dreifaltigkeitskirche) (1740) (frescoes)
- Mainau—Castle chapel (1737–1738) (frescoes)
- Merdingen—Parish Church of St. Remigius (1739–1741) (frescoes and altar paintings)
- Mochental—Castle chapel (1734) (fresco)
- St. Peter im Schwarzwald—St. Peter's Abbey in the Black Forest (1727; 1739) (frescoes)
- Salem—Cistercian Abbey Church (1730) (ceiling frescoes in the transepts and the organ loft)
- Stühlingen—Monastery Church of Maria Loreto (1740–1741) (four side altar paintings and upper galleries)
- Untersulmetingen—Chapel in Schloss Untersulmetingen (frescoes and oil paintings)
- Weingarten—Benedictine Monastery Church of St. Martin of Tours and St. Oswald (1783) (oil painting on side altar)
- Zwiefalten—Zwiefalten Münster (1728–1729; 1747–1753) (frescoes)

=== Bavaria ===
- Hergatz—Parish Church of Maria Thann (1722–1723) (frescoes)
- Lindau—Cathedral "Unserer Lieben Frau" (1736) (fresco)
- Ottobeuren—Benedictine Monastery Church of the Holy Trinity and monastery buildings (1723–1725) (frescoes in the corridors and stairways and in the secret archives of the abbot, the ceiling fresco of Comedy and Tragedy in the theater)

=== Switzerland ===
- Muri—Benedictine Abbey of St. Martin of Tours (1746) (five oil paintings for the high altar and side altar paintings)

== Gallery ==
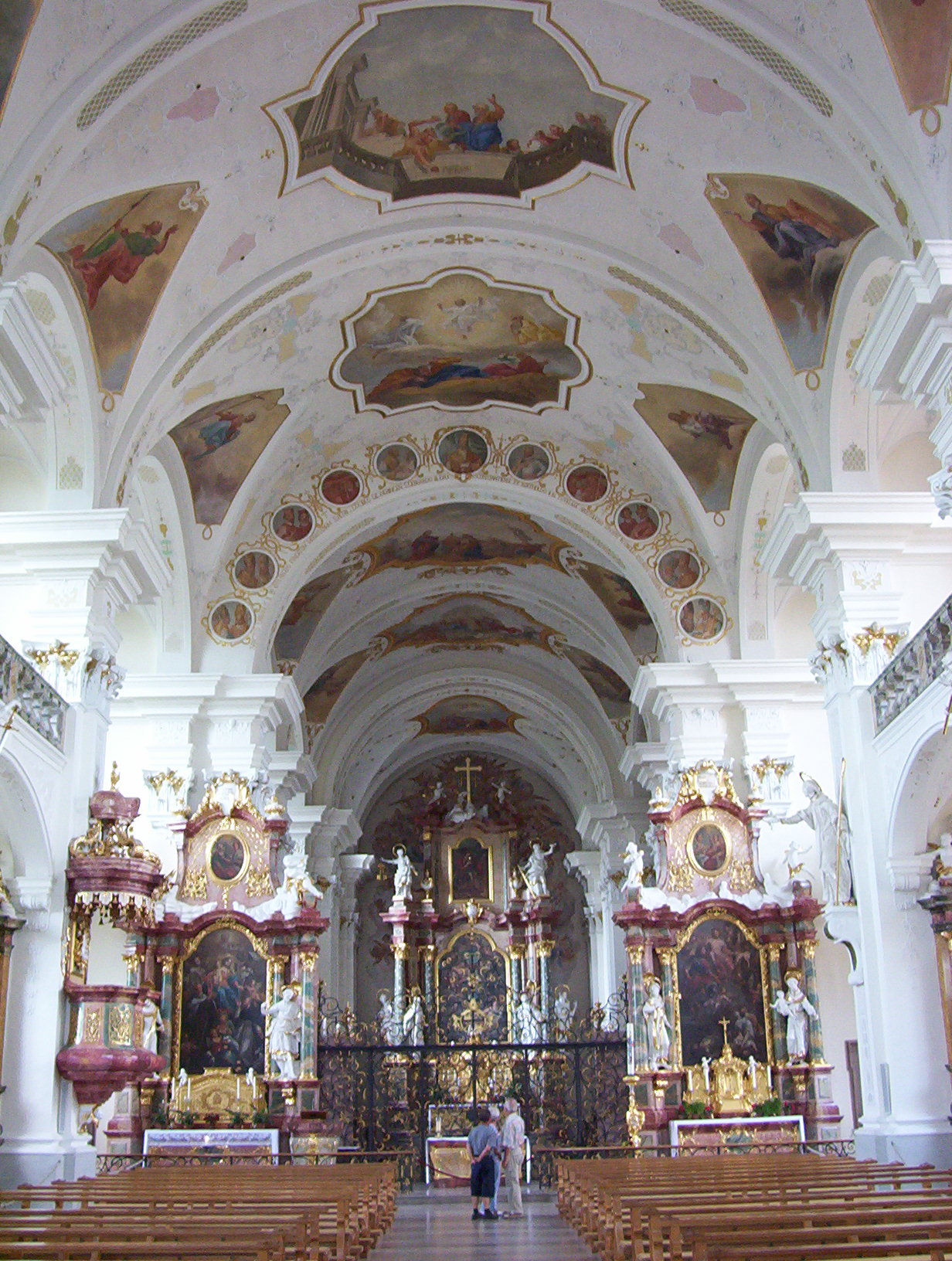
Interior of St. Peter's Abbey in the Black Forest

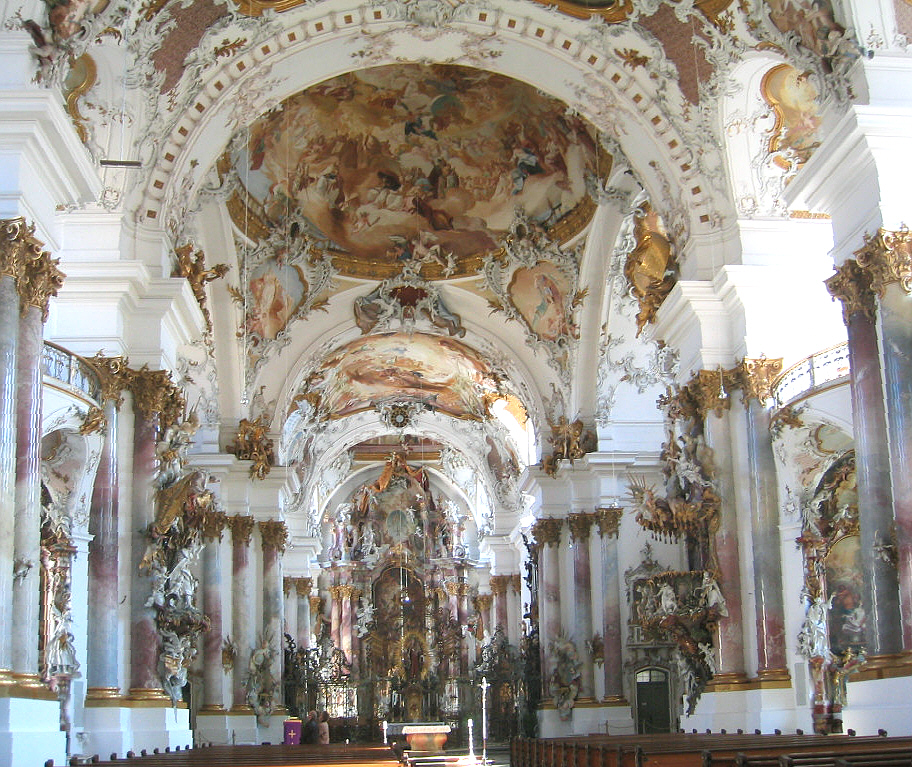
Interior of the Zwiefalten Abbey

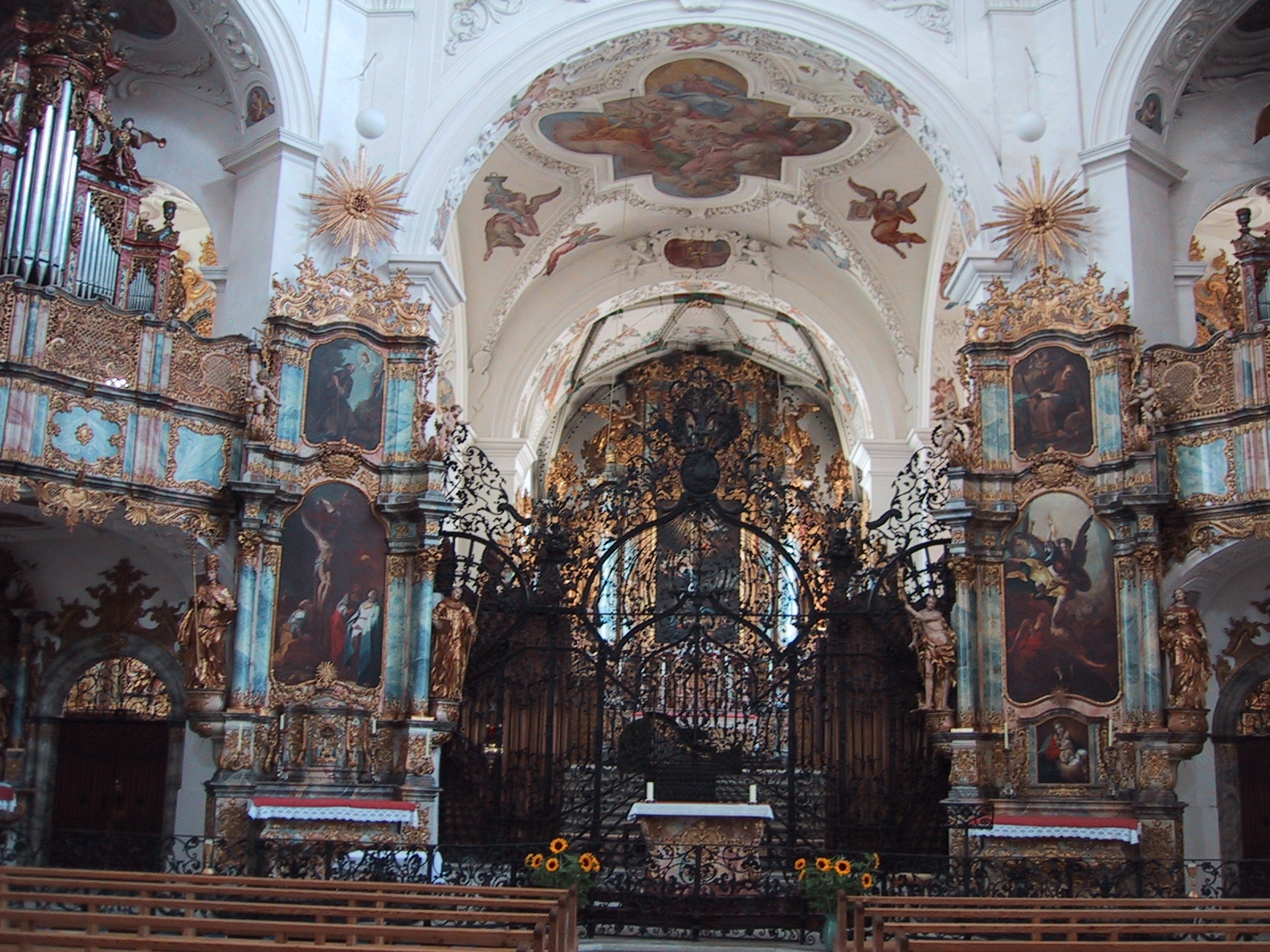
Interior of Muri Abbey, showing high altar painted by Spiegler

== Bibliography ==
- Bruno Bushart. Franz Joseph Spiegler. Versuch einer Positionsbestimmung. In: Eduard Hindelang (Ed.). Franz Anton Maulbertsch und sein schwäbischer Umkreis. Sigmaringen: Museum Langenargen, 1996. ISBN 3-7995-3165-3. pp. 87–114.
- Raimund Kolb. Franz Joseph Spiegler, 1691-1757. „Barocke Vision über dem See“. Erzähltes Lebensbild und wissenschaftliche Monographie. Bergatreute: Eppe, 1991. ISBN 3-89089-019-9.
- Peter Stoll: The Monasteranenagh miracle (1579): an Irish legend in a south German abbey church. In: Thomas O'Connor, Mary Ann Lyons (ed.): The Ulster earls and baroque Europe : Refashioning Irish identities, 1600 - 1800. Dublin : Four Courts Press, 2010. ISBN 978-1-84682-185-1. pp. 262 – 277. (About one of Spiegler's frescoes in Zwiefalten.)
