= Ortlieb of Zwiefalten =

Ortlieb of Zwiefalten (died 1164) was a German Benedictine monk who wrote the first chronicle of Zwiefalten Abbey and then served as abbot of Neresheim Abbey from 1140 until his death.

Ortlieb was the librarian of Zwiefalten during the "golden age" of its scriptorium. (Note: A period largely corresponding to the abbacy of Ulrich I (1095–1139) after the dedication of the abbey church in 1109.) Ortlieb is the scribe of the bookplate in at least 37 manuscripts originating in Zwiefalten, 29 of which include a decoration.

Ortlieb's Latin chronicle, De fundatione monasterii Zwivildensis libri duo, (Note: "Two Books on the Foundation of the Monastery of Zwiefalten") survives in only one manuscript. It is based in part on a collection of historical notices made by Ulrich, the second abbot of Zwiefalten. Ortlieb wrote between 1135 and 1137. His work is divided into two books and was intended for the use of the brothers. He may have left it unfinished. The chronicle of Berthold of Zwiefalten takes up the project. Berthold wrote later and makes use of Ortlieb's text, but Ortlieb also cites him as a source.

Ortlieb provides the correct etymology of Zwiefalten (Zwivaltaha): from Middle High German zwivalt (twofold) and aha (creek), or in Latin duplex fluvius. He occasionally inserts German words into his text, apologizing for the barbarisms and modestly feigning a lack of proficiency in Latin.
