= Neresheim Abbey =

Coordinates: 48°45′21″N 10°20′37″E

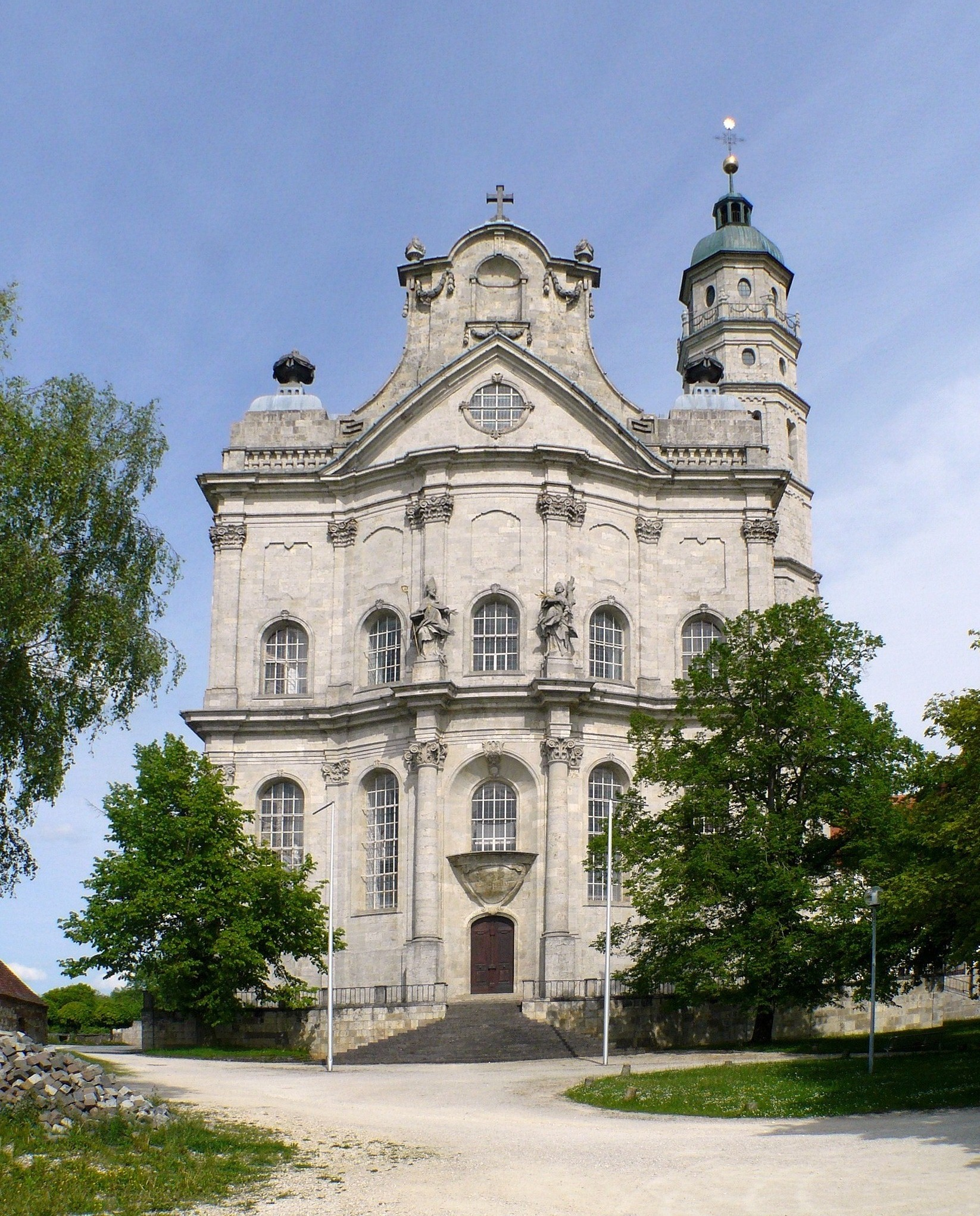
- Interactive map of Neresheim Abbey

Monastery information
- Order: Benedictine
- Established: 1095 (as a canon house); 1106 (as a monastery)
- Country: Germany

Neresheim Abbey or the Abbey of Saints Ulrich and Afra, Neresheim (German: Abtei Neresheim or Abtei der heiligen Ulrich und Afra) is located above the town of Neresheim in Baden-Württemberg, southern Germany. It is now a Benedictine monastery and is part of the Beuronese Congregation.

Coat of Arms of Neresheim Abbey

== First foundation ==
Neresheim was founded in 1095 as a house of (secular) Augustinian Canons, and converted to a Benedictine monastery in 1106. From 1140 until 1164, Ortlieb of Zwiefalten served as abbot.

In the 13th century, the abbey owned seven villages and it had an income from a further 71 places in the area. Ten parish churches were incorporated. The present abbey was erected between 1747 and 1792 from plans by Balthasar Neumann. After his death in 1753 his disciples and followers continued his work. It is a masterpiece of European baroque. During wars and conflicts the monastery was destroyed several times for example during the Thirty Years' War and during Napoleonic Wars of the beginning of the 19th century

== Second foundation ==
In 1802 the monastery was suppressed and secularized. Due to the disruptions caused by the Napoleonic invasion, custodianship over the abbey's assets and property was granted to the Princely House of Thurn und Taxis for the years 1803-06. Afterwards, the Bavarian state assumed ownership. Both the abbey and the County of Thurn un Taxis were annexed by the kingdom of Württemberg in 1810.

Precious objects were bought from Thurn und Taxis by Bavaria. The Prince of Thurn und Taxis funded and refounded the monastery, which opened in 1919. The first abbot was Bernhard Durst (1921–65). In 1919, the abbey was resettled by Benedictines from Beuron Archabbey and the Emaus Abbey in Prague.

== Church ==
The medieval monastery had a Roman basilica but in 1695 it was transformed to a baroque church. After much internal debate, in 1745, the decision was taken to build a new abbey church instead of rebuilding the old Romanesque church, which had been superficially updated to the Baroque style in the late 17th century. Abbot Amandus Fischer (1711–29) had brought in architect Dominikus Zimmermann to rebuild and redecorate the abbey's Festsaal, which was carried out in 1719-20 in a high Rococo style. Seeking stylistic continuity with his predecessor's building program, Abbot Aurelius Braisch (1739–55) commissioned architect and building engineer Johann Balthasar Neumann to rebuild the abbey church in 1747. Neumann, the most sought-after architect in central Europe at the time, had designed the pilgrimage church of Vierzehnheiligen and the Residenz at Würzburg, which were admired for their light formal invention, sumptuous materials and lightness of touch. Neumann's plan called for a conventional basilica consisting of nave, crossing and choir which were articulated as a series of oval-shaped bays surmounted with shallow domes.

Work commenced on the new church in 1750, but Neumann's premature death in 1753 necessitated the finding of new builders willing to carry out Neumann's plans. Subsequent architects altered or abandoned the original design, particularly the construction and profile of the domes, which slowed progress. The finished church, consecrated in 1792, should be attributed to Neumann with reservations or characterized as the work of disparate hands.

The domes were frescoed by Austrian painter Martin Knoller from Steinach, Austria over the six summers of 1770-75. Seven scenes from the Life of Christ are depicted, including Christ among the Doctors, the Last Supper and the Ascension.

Johann Nepomuk Holzhey of Ottobeuren built the last of the great South-German, Baroque organs at Neresheim between the years 1792 and 1797.

== The abbey today ==
Today there are 13 monks in the monastery, Norbert Stoffels having been their guiding abbot between 1977 and 2012. Now since March 2012 P. Albert Knebel is Prior-Administrator. There is a bookshop and a restaurant for visitors.

The monks run a conference centre and guesthouse, and offer courses and spiritual training. In 2004, the monastery set up the Neresheim Abbey Boys' Choir, which provides a free musical education and voice training. The choir sings regularly at services in the abbey church at Neresheim and also makes appearances outside the monastery.

In May 2010 the car of a kidnapped, later murdered person was found in the monastery yard. Visitors who took pictures in the period some days before and after May 13 were asked to contact the German police.

== See also ==
- 18th-century Western domes

== Pictures ==
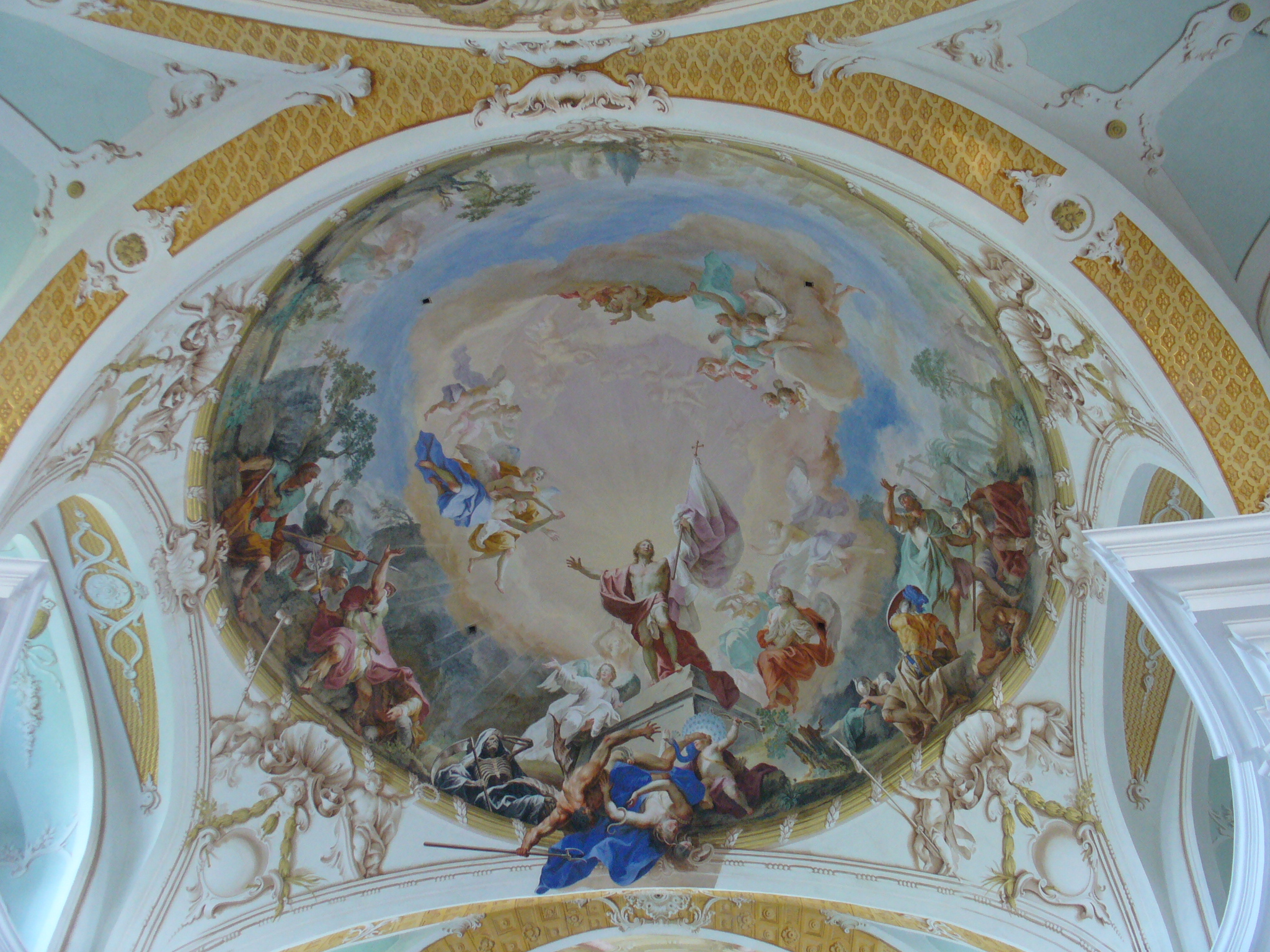
Main dome

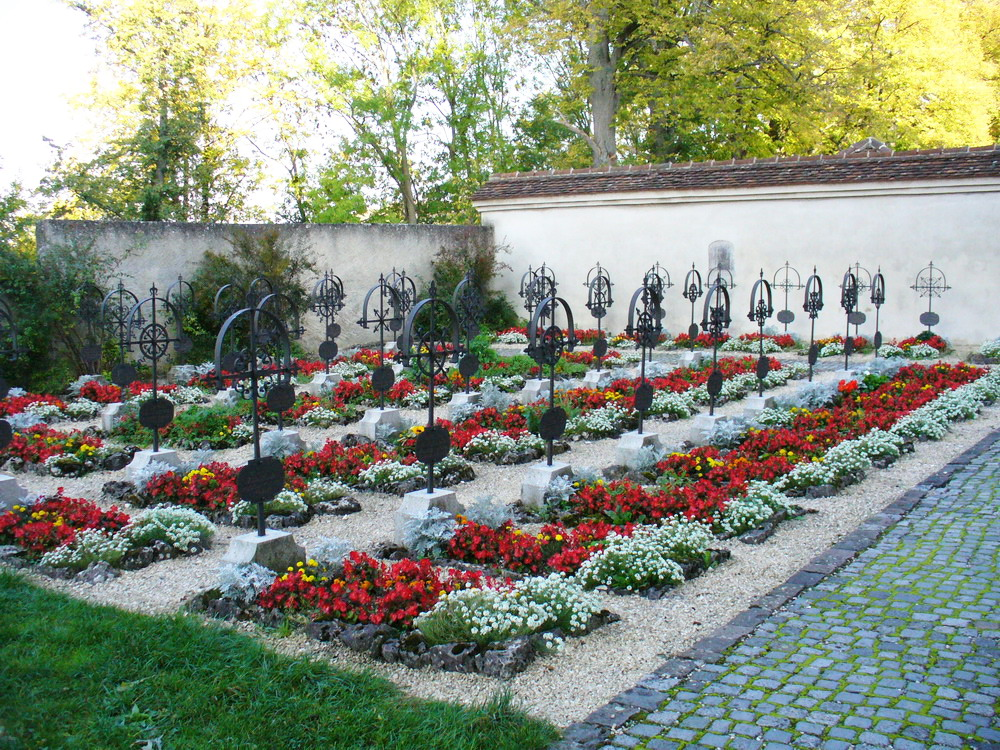
Abbey Cemetery

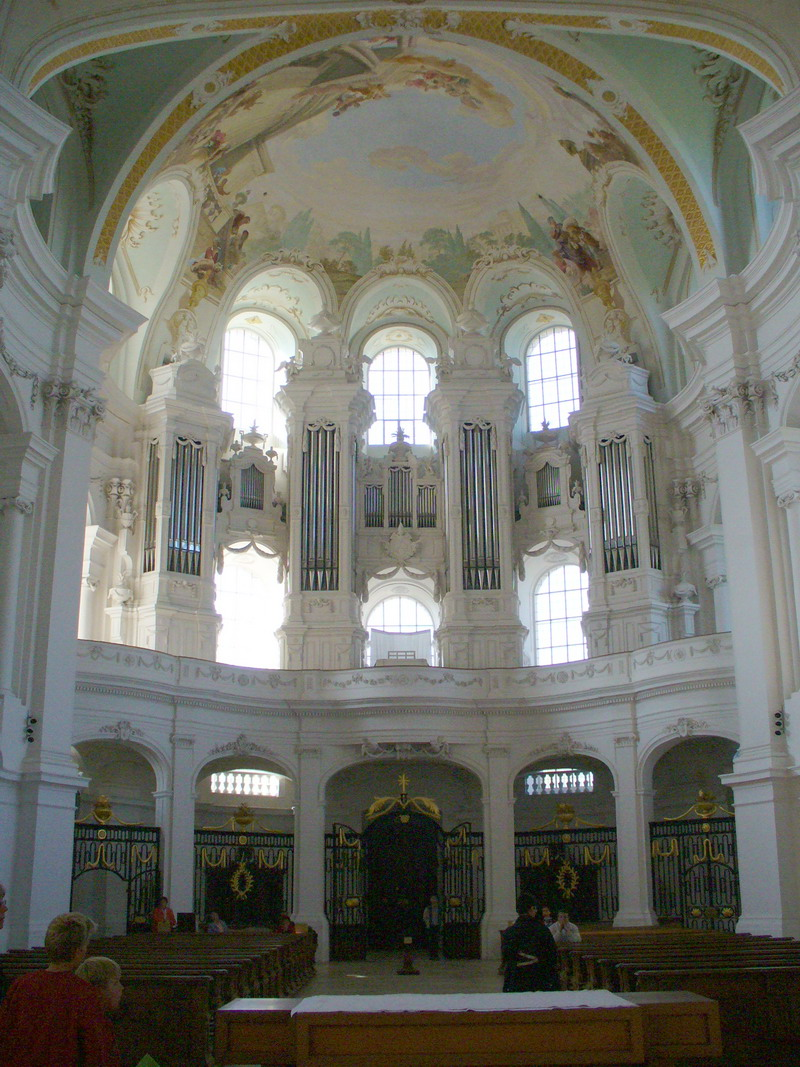
Holzhay-Organ

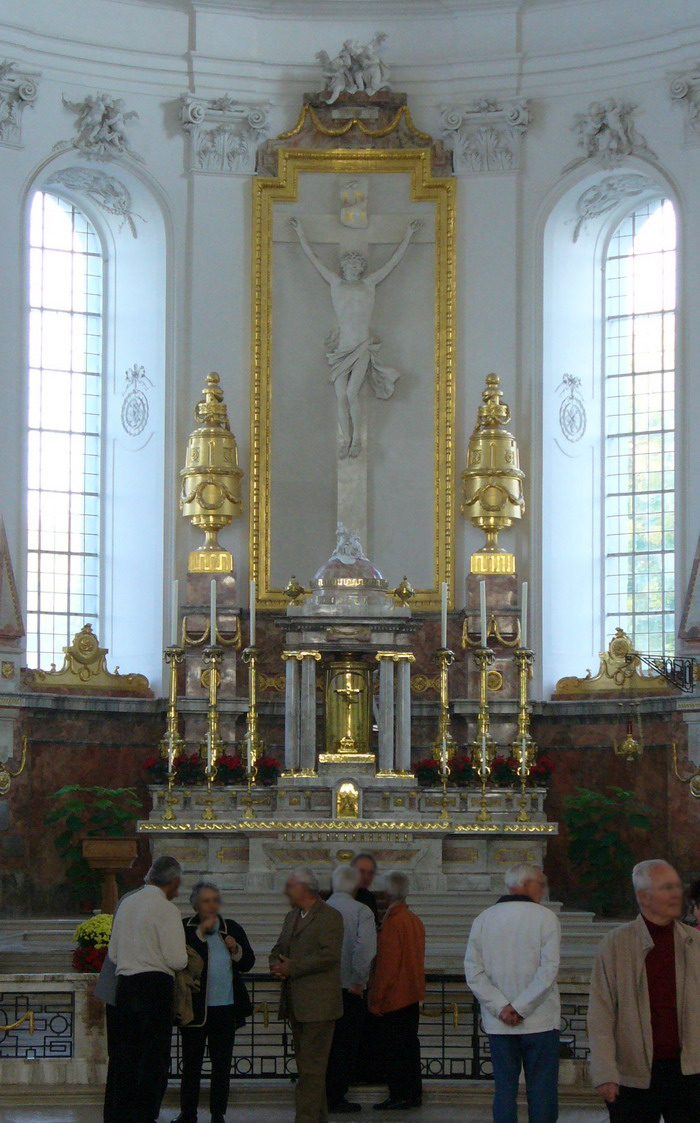
Main altar
