= Berthold of Zwiefalten =

Berthold of Zwiefalten (c. 1089 – 21 May 1169) was a German Benedictine monk who thrice served as abbot of Zwiefalten Abbey and wrote its early history.

Berthold was born around 1089 in Württemberg, the son of a nobleman of the same name. He entered Zwiefalten before 1098, but he was living at Kladrau in Bohemia in 1117. In 1135–1137 he was in Prague. In 1137, he was back in Zwiefalten as custos (custodian).

It was during the years 1137–38 that Berthold wrote the Latin Libellus (or Liber) de constructione Zwivildensis monasterii (Book on the Construction of Zwiefalten Monastery) as a continuation of the chronicle begun by Ortlieb of Zwiefalten, although it appears to have stemmed from a dispute between the two men. It was intended mainly for the internal use of the monastic community. At places, the Libellus is written more like a tract against the Emperor Henry IV. It draws on the chronicles of Bernold of Constance, Bonizo of Sutri, Ekkehard of Aura and Frutolf of Michelsberg as sources for these years.

Berthold was elected abbot in 1139, but was forced resign in 1141 after being accused of misuse of monastic property. He was re-elected in 1146 or 1147, but forced to resign a second time in 1152 or 1156. Elected a third time in 1148, he resigned a third time in 1169. He seems to have died on 21 May 1169, or perhaps later.
