= Zwiefalten Abbey =

German former Benedictine monastery

- Kloster Zwiefalten, Abtei Zwiefalten, Reichsabtei Zwiefalten
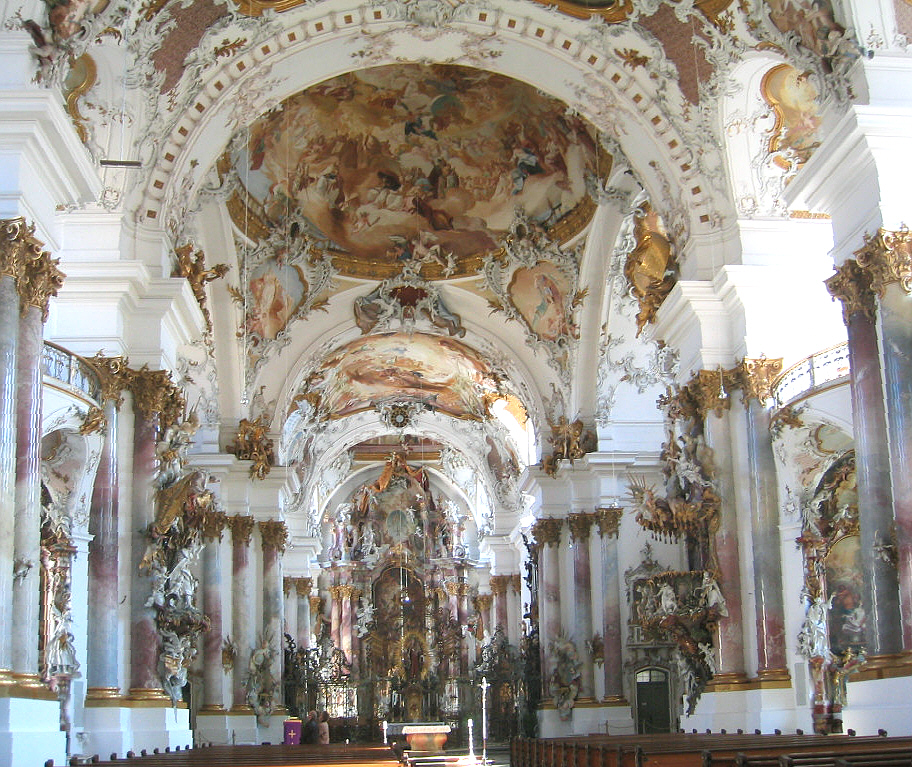
- Interior of the abbey church

- Location within Germany
- Interactive map of Zwiefalten Abbey

Monastery information
- Full name: Abbey of Our Lady of Zwiefalten
- Order: Benedictine
- Established: 1089
- Disestablished: 1802
- Mother house: Hirsau Abbey
- Dedication: Our Lady

People
- Founder: William of Hirsau

Architecture
- Status: closed
- Functional status: Sanatorium
- Architect: Johann Michael Fischer
- Style: Baroque

Site
- Location: Zwiefalten, Baden-Wurttemberg, Germany
- Coordinates: 48°13′55″N 9°27′41″E

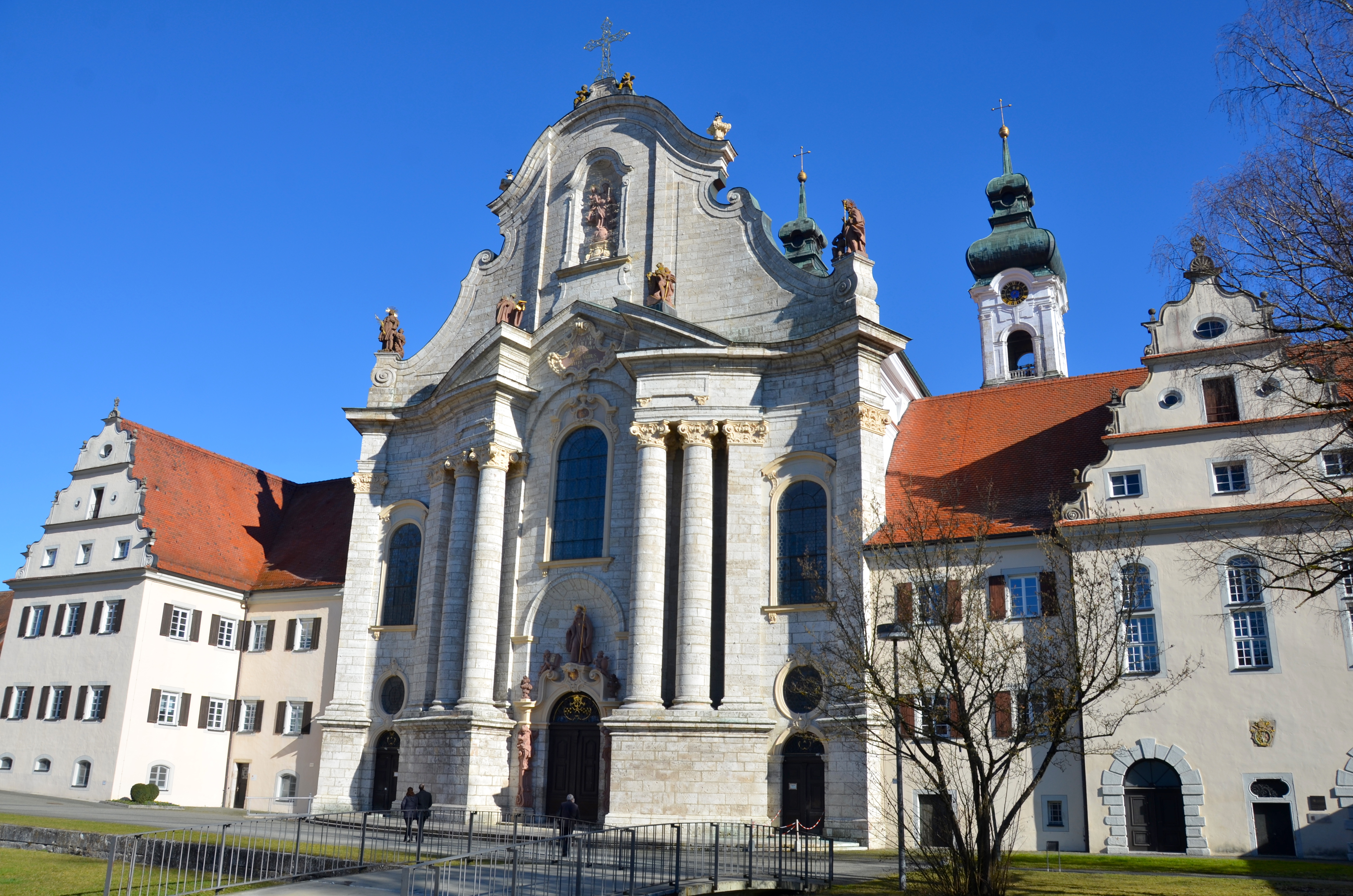
Minster of Our Lady, Zwiefalten

The Abbey of Our Lady of Zwiefalten, more commonly known as Zwiefalten Abbey (German: Kloster Zwiefalten, Abtei Zwiefalten or, after 1750, Reichsabtei Zwiefalten) is a former Benedictine monastery situated at Zwiefalten, near Reutlingen, in the German State of Baden-Württemberg. Zwiefalten lies on the touristic Upper Swabian Baroque Route. The abbey church is a major example of baroque architecture.

The complex is now the home of a psychiatric clinic.

== History ==
The monastery was founded in 1089 at the time of the Investiture Controversy by Counts Gero and Kuno of Achalm, advised by Bishop Adalbero of Würzburg and Abbot William of Hirsau. The first monks were also from Hirsau Abbey, home of the Hirsau Reforms (under the influence of the Cluniac reforms), which strongly influenced the new foundation. Noker von Zwiefalten was the first abbot and led from 1065–90. Zwiefalten adopted the "Hirsau Reforms" of abbot William of Hirsau.

Starting around 1100, Zweifalten was, for a time, a double-abbey. Gertrude (†1160), daughter of Duke Bolesław III Wrymouth of Poland was a nun at Zweifalten. Her mother, Salomea of Berg was a generous patron.

The monk Ortlieb wrote a history of the monastery in the early 12th century. Berthold continued it to 1137–38. He served as abbot in 1139–1141, 1146/7–1152/6 and 1158–1169.

During the 12th century Saint Ernest (died 1148) was abbot. Between 1145 and 1149 he participated in the Second Crusade to regain the Holy Land.

Although Pope Urban VI granted special privileges to it, Zwiefalten Abbey was nevertheless the private monastery of the Counts of Achalm, later succeeded by the Counts of Württemberg. The abbey was plundered in 1525 during the German Peasants' War.

Christoph Rassler was abbot from 1658–75 and Augustin Stegmüller was abbot in the 18th century. In 1739, work commenced on the abbey, which continued by Johann Michael Fischer until 1765 . It is considered a model of integrated Baroque design. Frescoes in the church by Franz Joseph Spiegler are considered his best work.

In 1750 the abbey was granted the status of Reichsabtei, which meant that it had the status of an independent power subject only to the Imperial Crown and was free of the rule of Württemberg. Benedictine Ernest Weinrauch was a highly respected organ player and contrapuntist, who composed an oratorio at Zwiefalten.

On 25 November 1802, however, it was secularised and dissolved and became a lunatic asylum and later psychiatric hospital, which it is today, as well as the site of the Württemberg Psychiatry Museum.

== Buildings ==
The present buildings were constructed in German Baroque style from 1739–47 under the direction of Johann Michael Fischer (1692–1766) of Munich, who began overseeing the work in 1741. The interior, considered a model of Baroque design, is filled with ornate chapels and gilded balustrades, dominated by the high altar, which combines a Gothic statue of the Virgin Mary dating from 1430 with Baroque additions (dating from about 1750) by Johann Joseph Christian (1706–77). The elaborate frescoes are by Franz Joseph Spiegler (1691–1757).

== Gallery ==
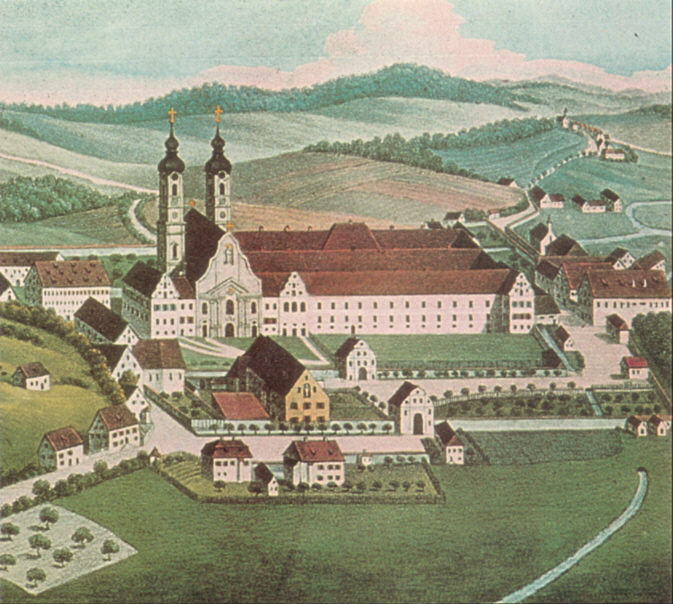
Zwiefalten, 1826

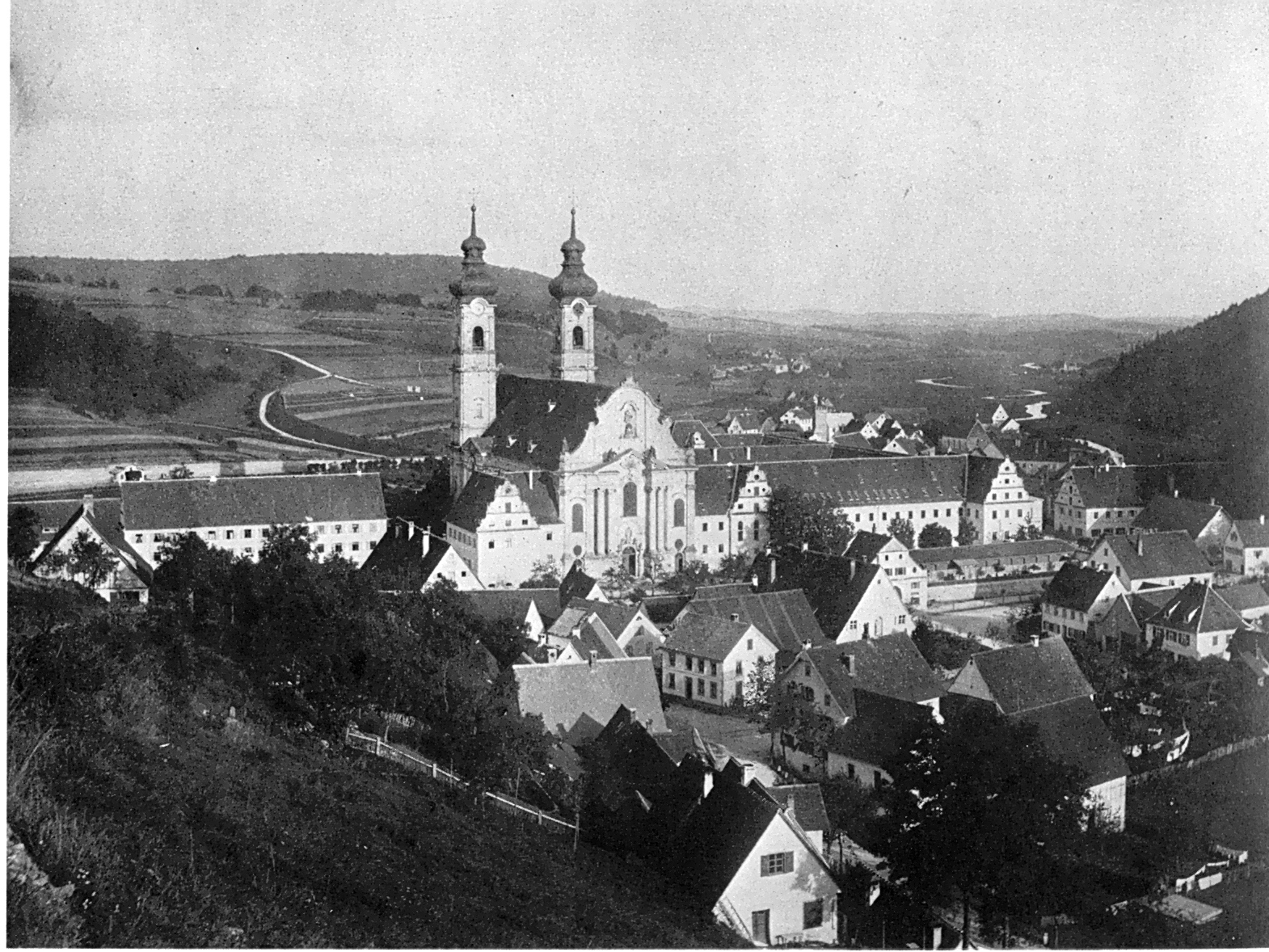
The Abbey in 1890

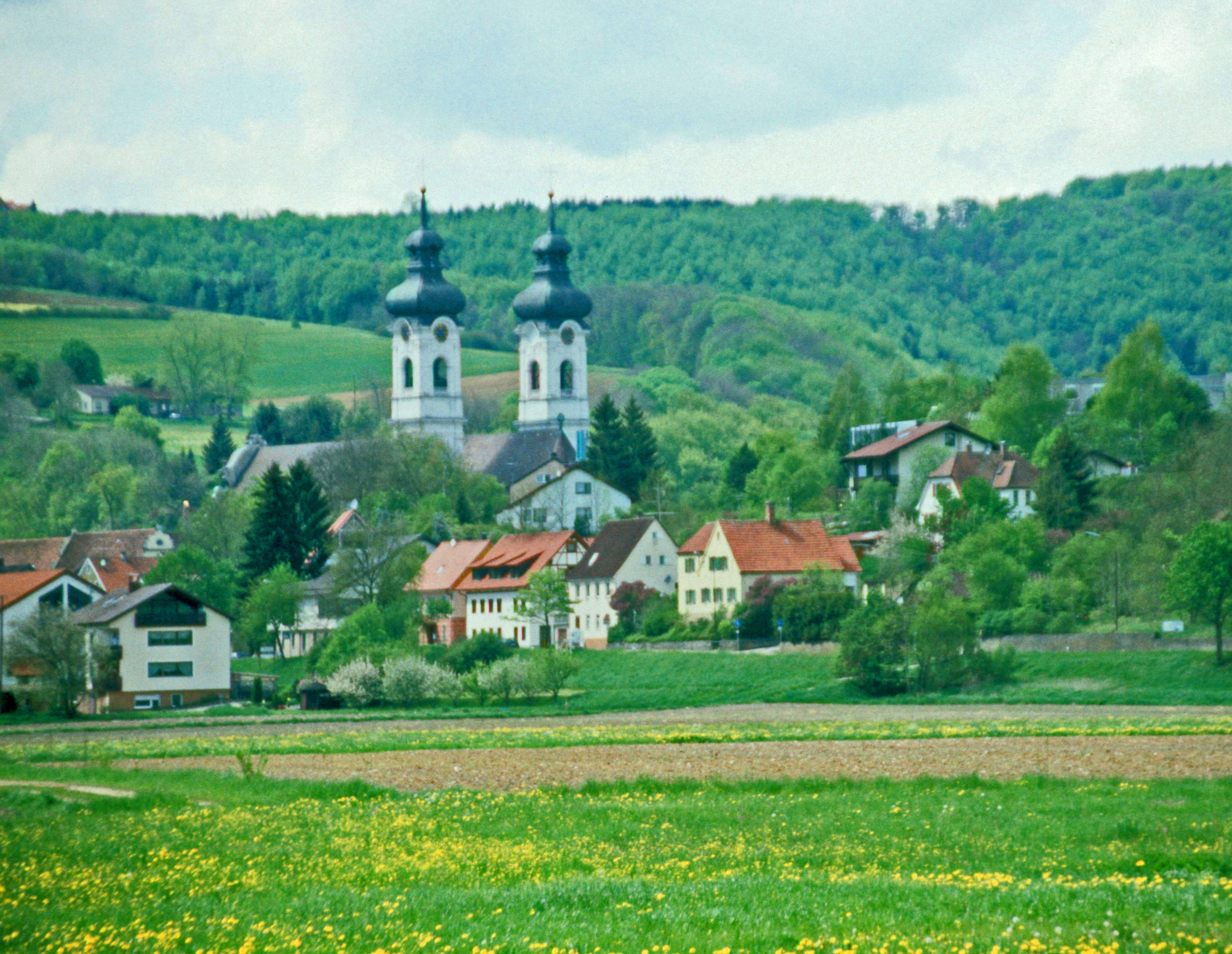
The Abbey in 2002

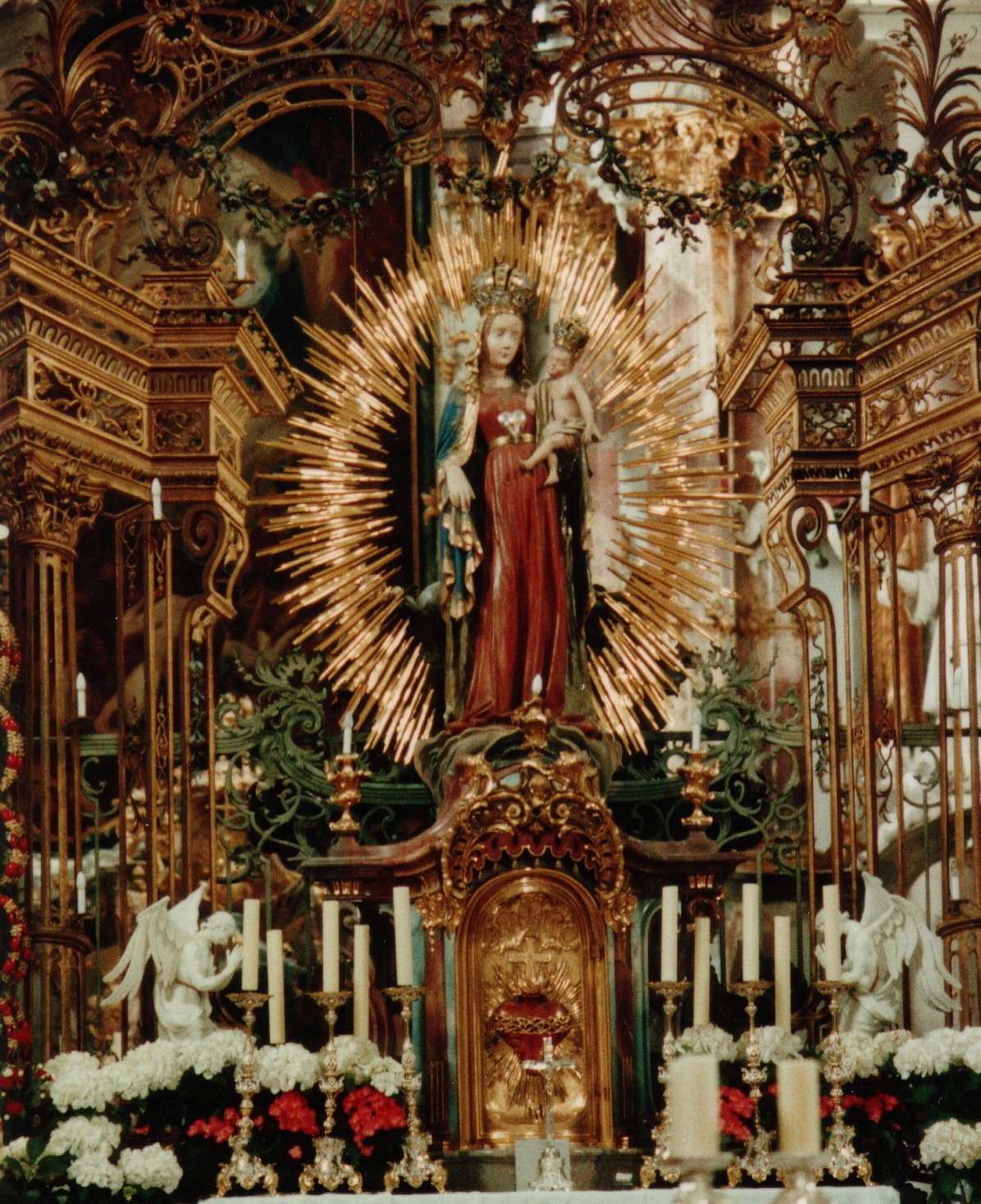
High altar in Zwiefalten Abbey

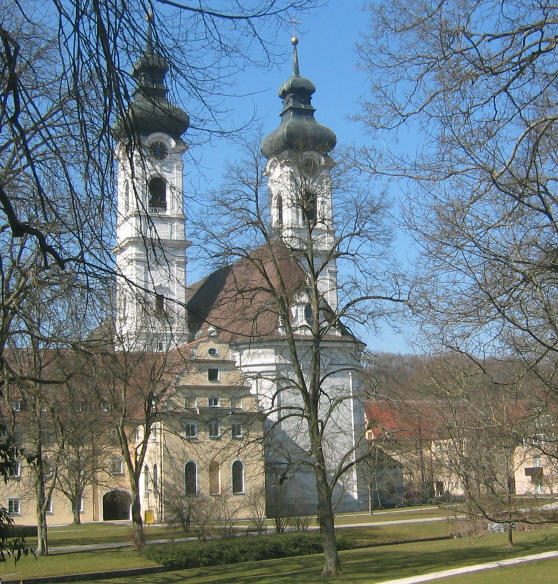
Exterior of the abbey

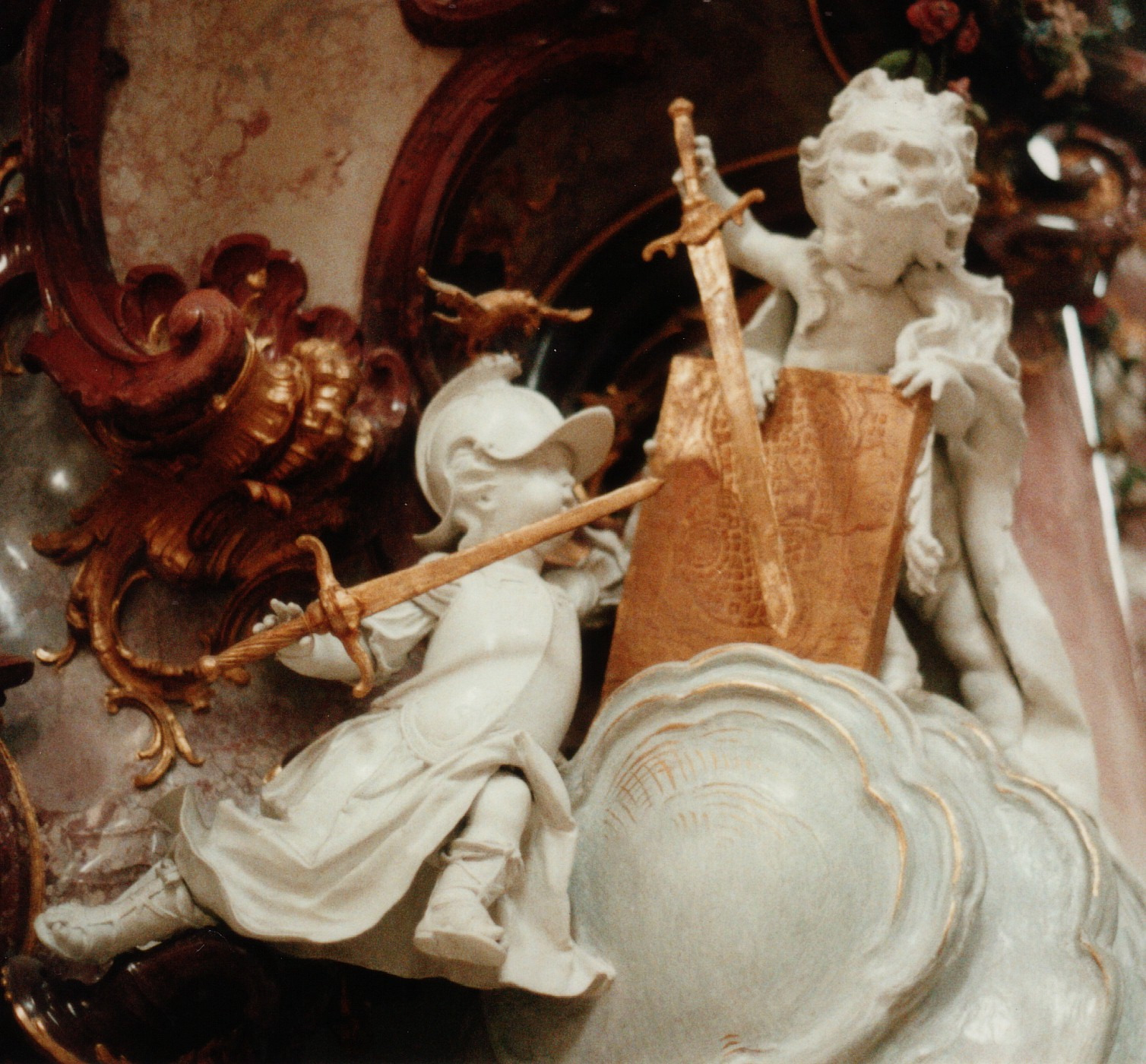
Nebuchadnezzar battles King Zedekiah of Judah, who holds a plan of Jerusalem

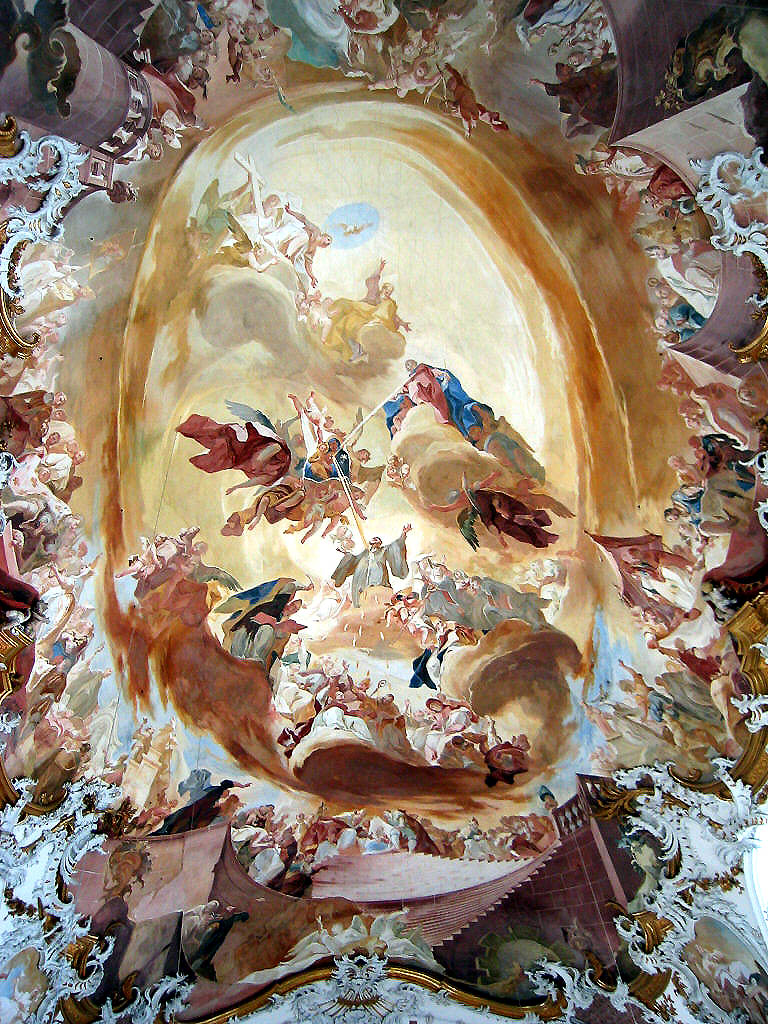
Ceiling fresco in the abbey
