= Zajčje Polje =

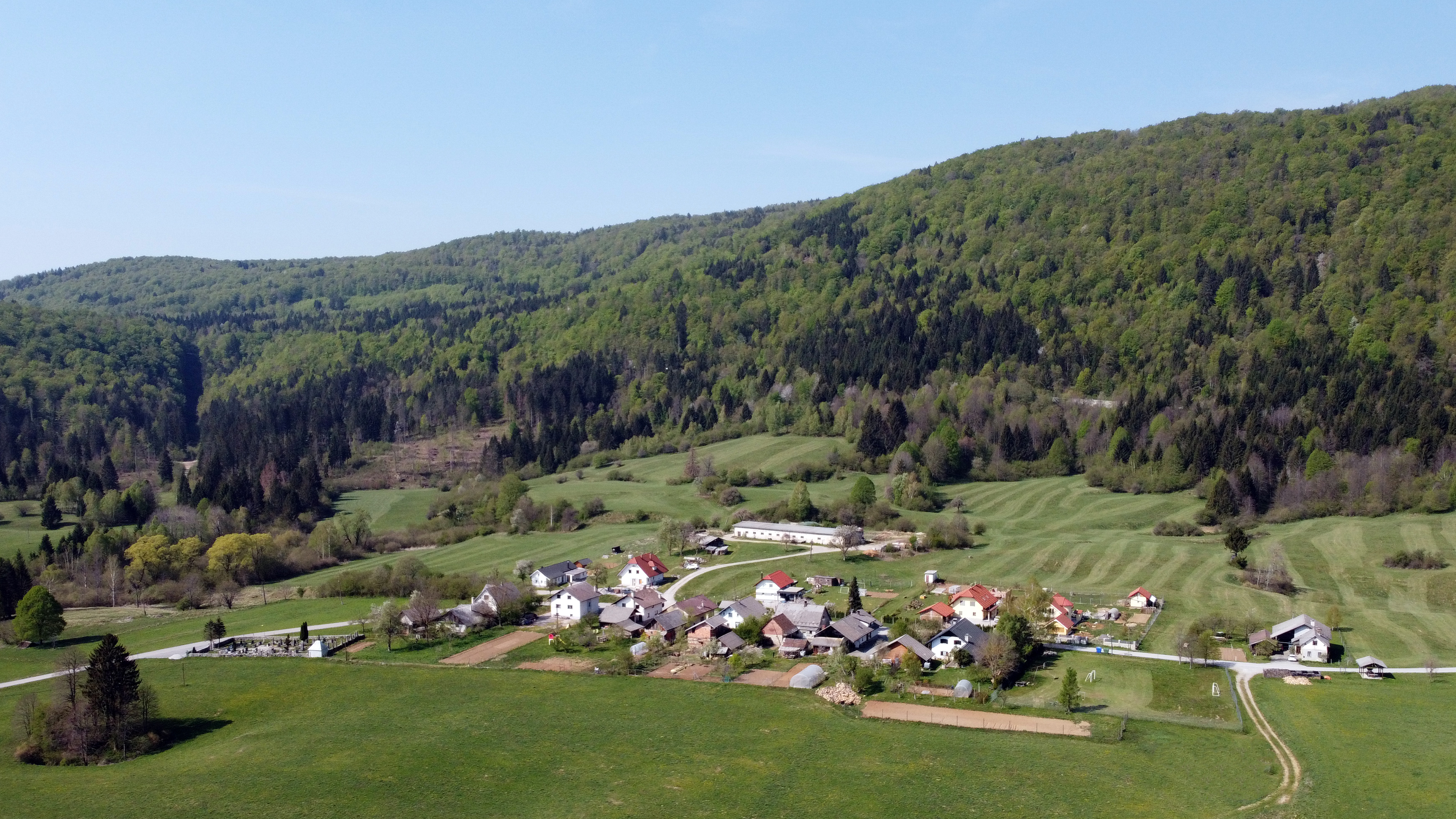

- Location in Slovenia
- Coordinates: 45°35′50.55″N 14°53′33.7″E
- Country: Slovenia
- Traditional region: Lower Carniola
- Statistical region: Southeast Slovenia
- Municipality: Kočevje

Area
  - Total: 3.22 km^{2} (1.24 sq mi)
- Elevation: 474.9 m (1,558 ft)

Population (2002)
  - Total: 38
- Postal code: 1330

Zajčje Polje (pronounced [ˈzaːi̯tʃjɛ ˈpoːljɛ]; also formerly Zajčja vas, German: Hasenfeld or Hasenbach, Gottscheerish: Huəshnbold) is a settlement in the Municipality of Kočevje in southern Slovenia. It was inhabited mostly by Gottschee Germans. The area is part of the traditional region of Lower Carniola and is now included in the Southeast Slovenia Statistical Region.

== Name ==
The Slovene name Zajčje Polje, the German name Hasenfeld, and the Gottscheerish name Huəshnbold all literally mean 'hare field'. It is presumed that Haas (literally, 'hare') was the surname of one of the early settlers here, and that the village is named after him. The alternate Slovene name Zajčja vas means 'hare village' and the alternate German name Hasenbach means 'hare creek'.

== History ==
Zajčje Polje was a Gottschee German village. In the Kočevje land registry of 1574 the village had six full farms that were subdivided into 12 half-farms, corresponding to a population between 90 and 100. In 1770 the settlement had 22 houses. Before the Second World War the settlement had 24 houses and a population of 96. Early in the war its original population was evicted. Italian troops burned the area in the summer of 1942 but did not destroy all of the houses. Some of the old houses were renovated after the war.

== Churches and cemetery ==
The local church was originally a 17th-century building dedicated to Saint Anthony. The church stood on the southwest edge of the village and was first mentioned in written sources by Johann Weikhard von Valvasor. It had a polygonal chancel walled on three sides. It was razed in 1741.

In its place a chapel dedicated to Saint Valentine was built, and this was converted to a church when a nave was added to it in 1867. Saint Valentine's Church had a hexagonal chancel walled on five sides, a rectangular nave, and a wooden bell-cot above the entrance. The church received a new roof and a new ceiling in the nave in 1938 and 1939. The chancel had a metal roof, and the nave had a tile roof. The bell-cot had a square metal hip roof. A simple stone door casing stood at the entrance. The nave had two rectangular windows set in stone casings on either side, and a coffered wooden ceiling. Saint Valentine's Church survived the war in good condition, but was demolished after 1947.

The village also has a cemetery, which was established in 1836. It lies south of the village, along the road from Črni Potok pri Kočevju to Kočevje. The cemetery is in active use and is one of the better-preserved cemeteries in Gottschee, containing many stone and cast-iron Gottschee German grave markers.
