= Wimsener Höhle =

Cave in Hayingen, Germany

Wimsener Cave
- Wimsener Höhle
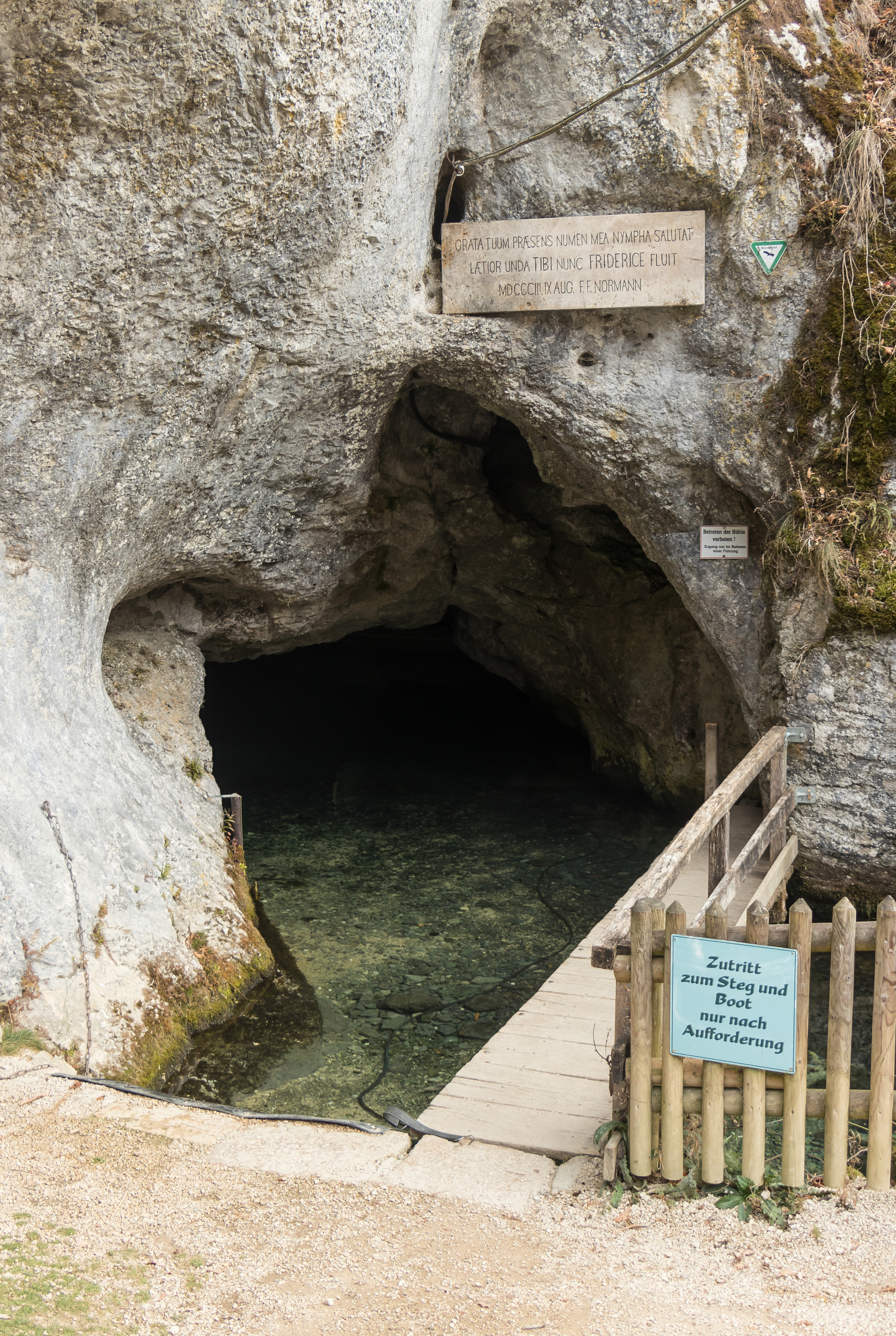
- Wimsener Höhle cave entrance
- Interactive map of Wimsener Cave
- Location: Hayingen, Baden-Württemberg, Germany
- Coordinates: 48.2565°N 9.4482°E
- Length: 723 Metern metres (show cave is 70 metres)
- Discovery: first record 1477
- Geology: karst
- Show cave opened: 1803
- Lighting: electric (since 1927)
- Visitors: 70,000 (2011)
- Features: Germany´s only watercave which can be visited by boat
- Website: Official website

The Wimsener Höhle (or Wimsen Cave) is Germany´s only water cave, which can be visited by boat. It is located in the municipal area of Hayingen on the Swabian Alb, about three kilometers north of Zwiefalten.

== Description ==
The Wimsener Höhle or Wimsen Cave is Germany´s only water cave, which can be visited by boat. It is located in Wimsen, part of the municipal area of Hayingen, about three kilometers north of Zwiefalten a small hamlet on the Swabian Alb. Wimsen consists of a mill, a barn, an inn and the Wimsener cave, all of which is privately owned belonging to Ehrenfels Castle.

Of the cave´s 1200 meters in length only 70 meters are accessible to a visitor in a boat. About 70 meters behind the entrance the cave ceiling drops down to the water surface, so the rest of the cave can only be explored with diving equipment.

The Zwiefalter Aach arises from the cave with an average flow of 590 L/s, a minimum of 60 L/s, and a maximum of 6240 L/s. Water and air temperature in the cave are between 7 and 8 °C representing the annual mean temperature of the region.

== History ==
In 1803, Duke Friedrich II, the later King Frederick I of Württemberg visited the cave, after which the cave was also named "Friedrichshöhle" in his honor.

In 1910, the limestone cave was partly surveyed. It was not until 1959, when divers were able to penetrate a siphon, that further explorations and measurements could be made.

From 1961 to 1975, Jochen Hasenmayer, among others, played an important role, as he reached 400 meters far and 40 meters deep into the cave.

== Geology ==
The Wimsener Höhle is located in limestone rocks of the Weißjura Formation, which were deposited in the Jurassic ocean some 150 million years ago. The Wimsen cave is estimated to be about one million years old and was created as is typical for a solutional cave by the spring water of the Zwiefalter Aach, which when rainwater absorbed carbonic acid, seeped through the soil layers in the catchment area and penetrated deeply into the white jura.

== See also ==
- List of show caves in Germany

== Literature ==
- Rainer Straub (2013). Die Wimsener Höhle - Expedition in die tiefste Unterwasserhöhle Deutschlands. Thorbecke. p. 112. ISBN 3799507957.
