= Zwiefalten =

- Municipality
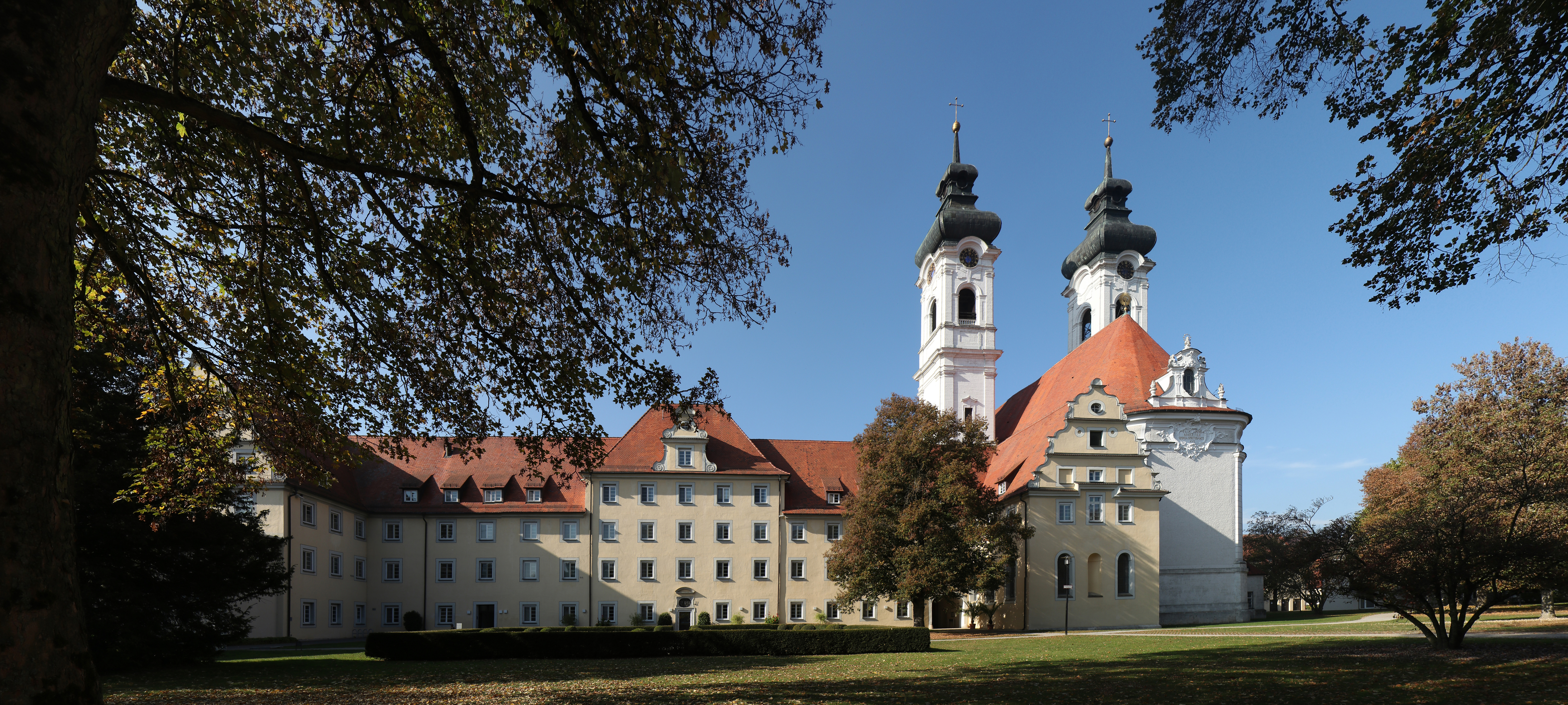

- Coat of arms

- Location of Zwiefalten within Reutlingen district
- Interactive map of Zwiefalten
- Location within Germany Location within Baden-Württemberg
- Coordinates: 48°13′57″N 09°27′51″E
- Country: Germany
- State: Baden-Württemberg
- Admin. region: Tübingen
- District: Reutlingen

Government
  - Mayor (2020–28): Alexandra Hepp (CDU)

Area
  - Total: 45.43 km^{2} (17.54 sq mi)
- Elevation: 538 m (1,765 ft)

Population (2025-12-31)
  - Total: 2,303
  - Density: 50.69/km^{2} (131.3/sq mi)
- Time zone: UTC+01:00 (CET)
  - Summer (DST): UTC+02:00 (CEST)
- Postal codes: 88529
- Dialling codes: 07373
- Vehicle registration: RT
- Website: www.zwiefalten.de

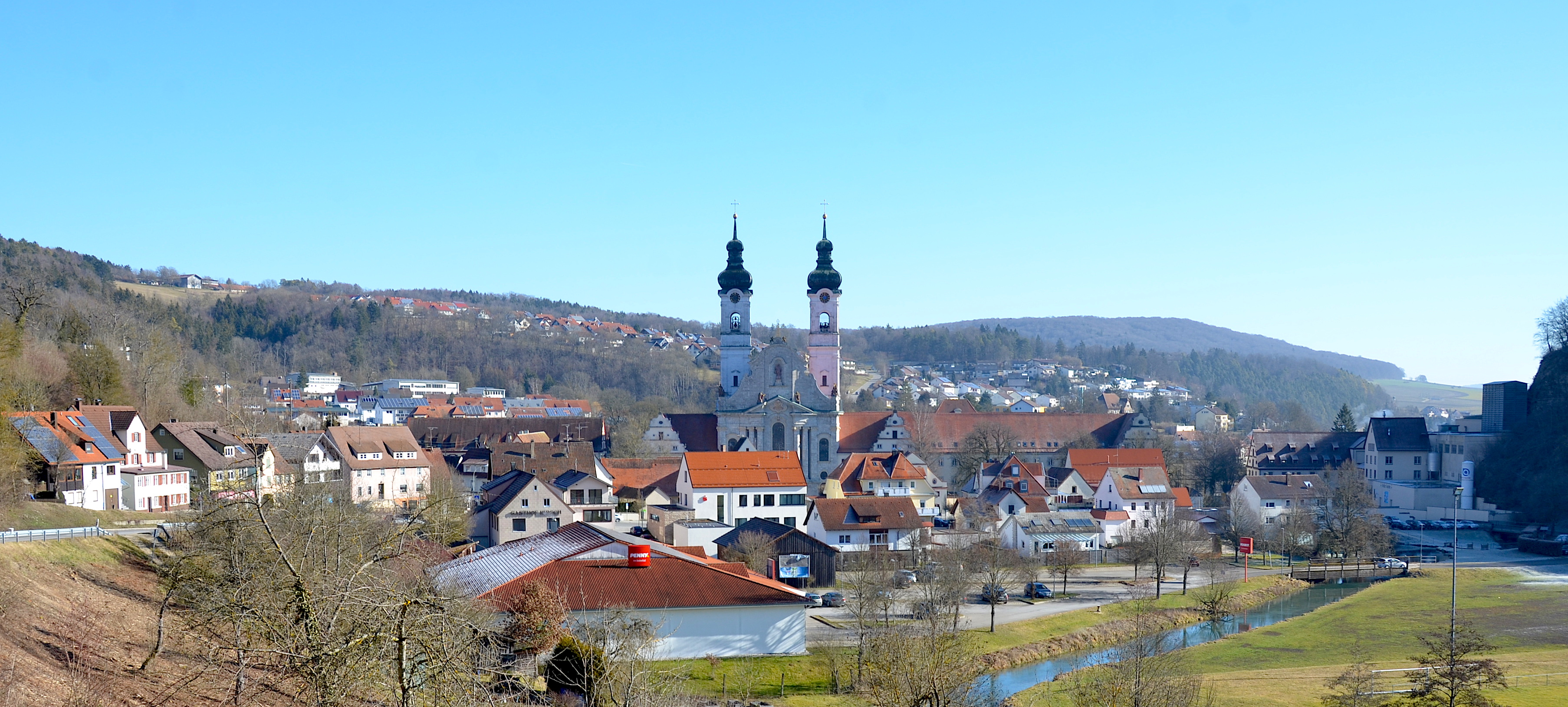
Zwiefalten (View towards East)

Zwiefalten (German pronunciation: [ˈt͡sviːˌfaltn̩]) is a municipality in the district of Reutlingen, Baden-Württemberg, Germany located halfway between Stuttgart and Lake Constance. The former Zwiefalten Abbey dominates the town. The former monastery is considered one of the finest examples of late Baroque art.

== Geographical location ==
The name derives from its location in the valleys of Zwiefalter Aach and the Kessel-Aach and was mentioned first as Zwivaltum in 904.

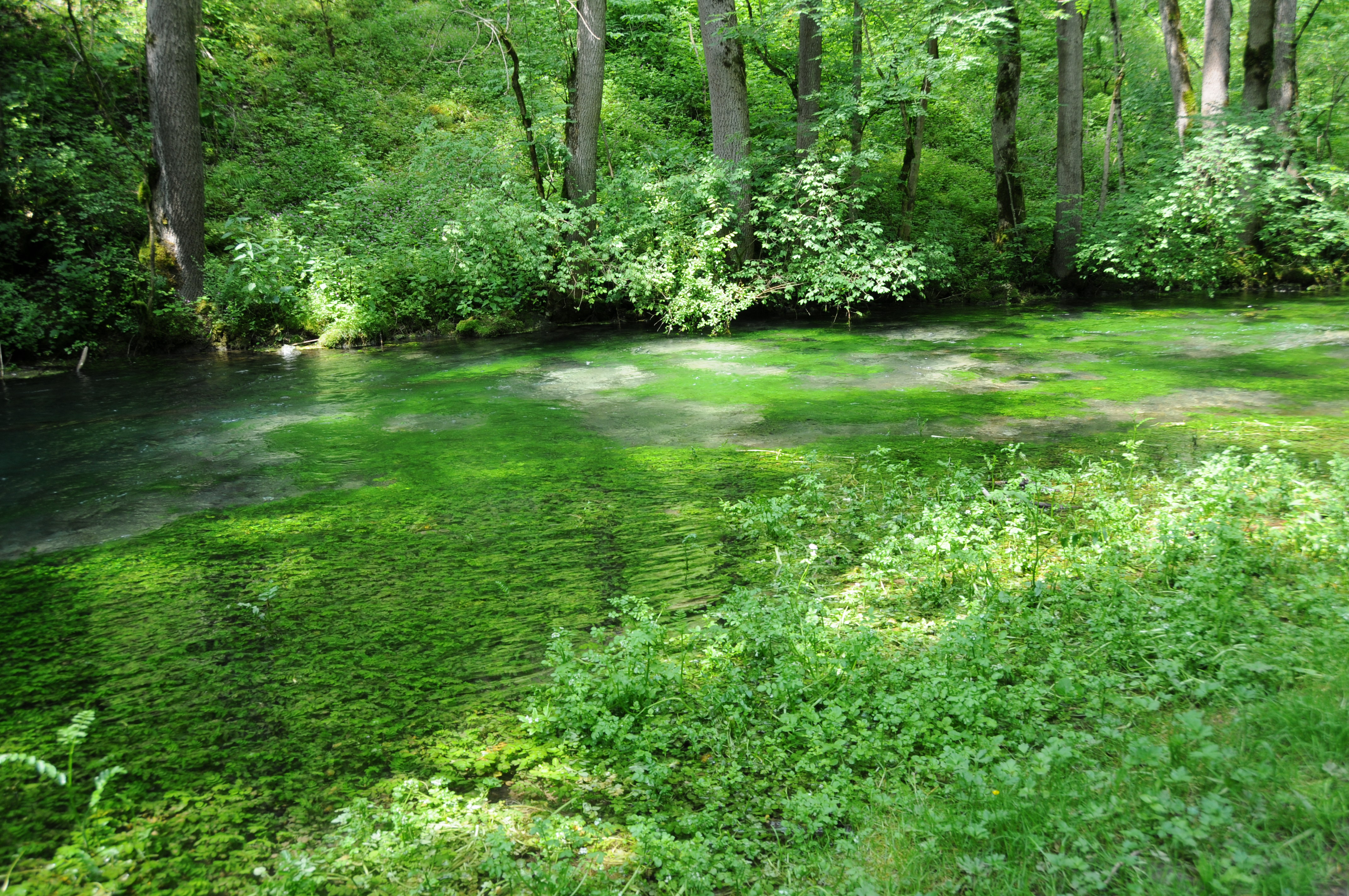
Zwiefalter Ach south of Wimsener Höhle

== Neighboring communities ==
The following cities and towns are bordering to the municipality of Zwiefalten (listed clockwise from the north) and belong to the district of Reutlingen and the Alb-Donau-district¹ and district Biberach²: Hayingen, Emeringen¹, Riedlingen², Langenenslingen² and Pfronstetten.

== Municipality arrangement ==
The municipality Zwiefalten with the municipality parts Baach, Gauingen, Gossenzugen, Hochberg, Mörsingen, Sonderbuch, and Upflamör Zwiefalten include a total of seven villages, one hamlet (Attenhöfen) and three yards (Loretto, Bühlhof, Straubinger).

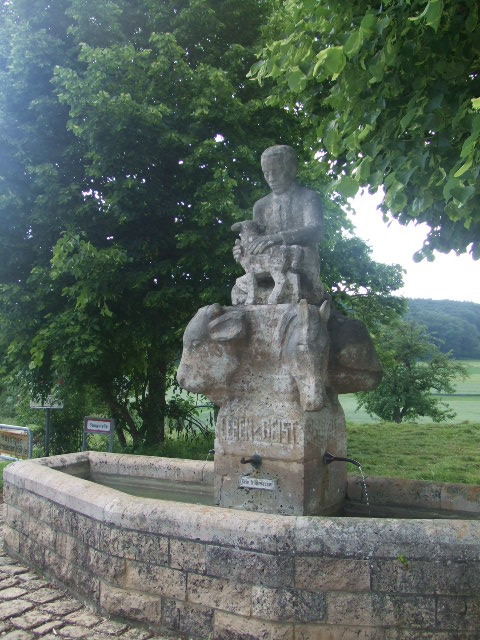
Gauingen fountain

== History ==
Zwiefalten owes its former value the Benedictine Zwiefalten Abbey, founded in 1089 by monks from Hirsau. Until the 15th century the convent succeeded to buy a large territory on the Swabian Jura. In 1525, during the German Peasants' War, peasants looted the monastery.

For area of the monastery Zwiefalten were the places

- Aichelau (today Pfronstetten)
- Aichstetten (today Pfronstetten)
- Daugendorf (today Riedlingen)
- Dürrenwaldstetten (today Langenenslingen)
- Geisingen (today Pfronstetten)
- Mörsingen (today Zwiefalten)
- Neuhausen an der Erms (1750, today Metzingen)
- Oberstetten (today Hohenstein)
- Ödenwaldstetten (1750, today Hohenstein)
- Pfronstetten
- Tigerfeld (today Pfronstetten)
- Unlingen
- Upflamör (today Zwiefalten)
- Wilsingen (today Trochtelfingen)

Ceiling painting in Münster At the secularisation of 1803 the monastery was forcibly dissolved. 1812 the royal Württemberg sanatorium was established in the monastery buildings.

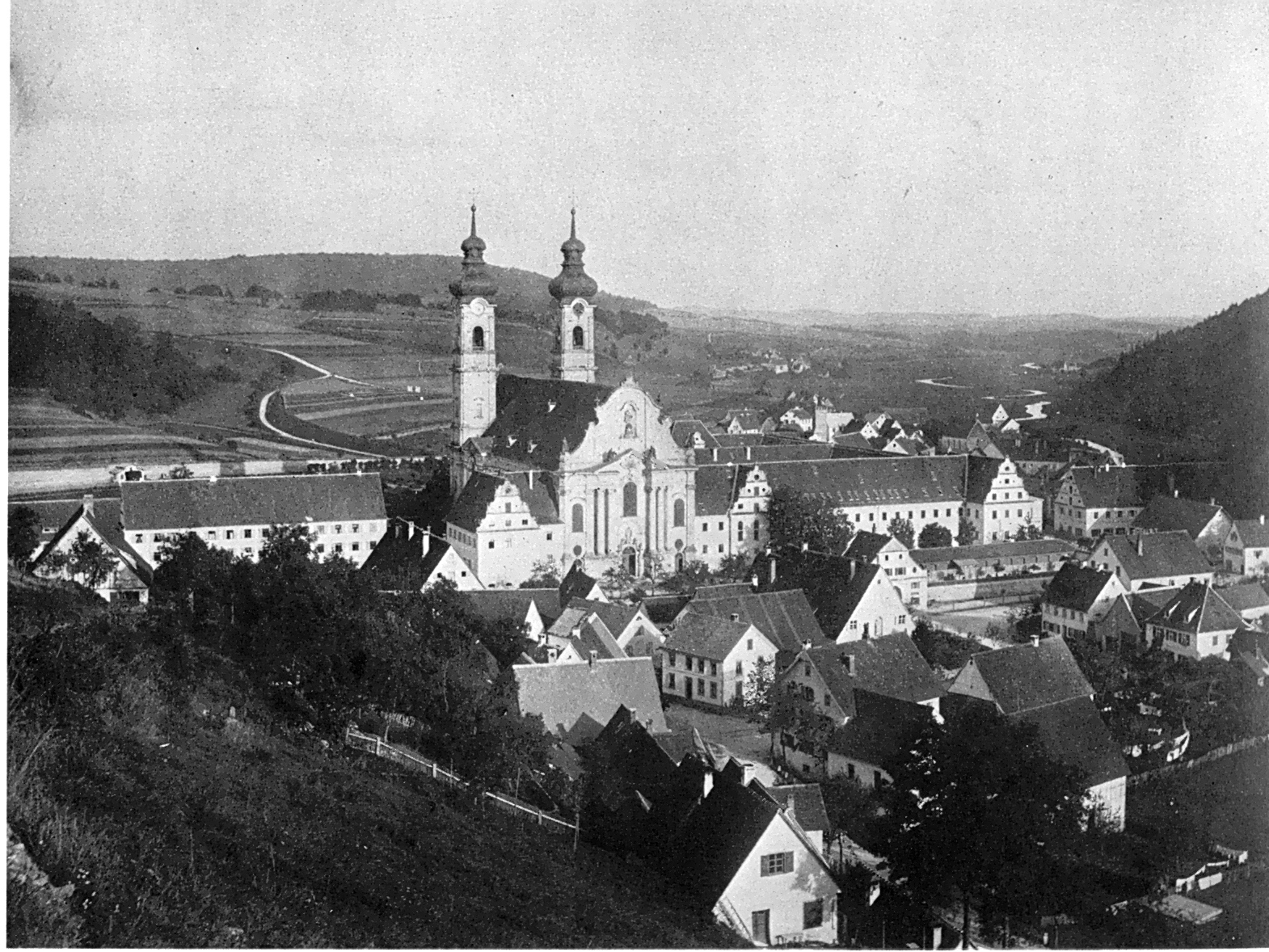
Zwiefalten 1890

As part of the Nazi euthanasia killings of Action T4, the State Hospital and Sanatorium Zwiefalten was an intermediate storage for the killing center Grafeneck Castle. At least 1 673 mentally ill women, men, teenagers and children were "relocated" 1939/40 on Zwiefalten in other public institutions or to Grafeneck. The so-called "gray buses" of the Gemeinnützige Krankentransport GmbH (Gekrat) were always in town in this period. The laid between patients and residents came from Ellwangen, Fußbach, Heggbach, Kaufbeuren, Konstanz, Kork, Krautheim, Liebenau, Maria Berg, Rastatt, Sinsheim and Stetten im Remstal. As part of the "euthanasia" -killing action T4, the first transport of 50 women left Zwiefalten on 2 April 1940. Until December 9, 1940 more than 1,000 patients were deported and killed in 22 transports from Zwiefalten to Grafeneck. However, the killing of patients in Zwiefalten was continued with morphine or trional syringe. In 1949 the former director Martha Fauser (Director 1940-1945) was sentenced to a prison term of only one year and six months for the "crime of manslaughter". A memorial stone in the cemetery commemorates this event. Today the former monastery is the center of Psychiatry Clinic Münster Zwiefalten.

=== Baach with Attenhöfen ===
Incorporated 1938, (535 m above sea level; 260 inhabitants) Baach is on the road from Riedlingen to Aachtal. Attenhöfen is a hamlet of four farms on a hill above the right bank of Aach and the southernmost city in the district of Reutlingen.

=== Gossenzugen ===
Incorporated 1938, (545 m above sea level; 120 inhabitants) Gossenzugen is located northwest of Zwiefalten in the valley of Zwiefalter Aach.

=== Gauingen ===
Incorporated on 1 January 1975 (738 m above sea level; 140 inhabitants) Gauingen is on Hochalb on the road to Reutlingen (B 312). A street village that goes down from high surface in a side valley of Zwiefalter Aach.

=== Hochberg ===
Incorporated On 1 January 1975. (685 m above sea level; 80 inhabitants) Hochberg is five kilometers above Zwiefaltens westwards on the edge of the Tobeltal.

=== Mörsingen ===
Incorporated on February 1, 1972 (661 m above sea level; 100 inhabitants) Mörsingen lies in a valley in the Swabian Jura, about 5 km southwest of Zwiefalten.

=== Sonderbuch ===
Incorporated on January 1, 1975 (674 m above sea level; 190 inhabitants) Sonderbuch is lying on the slope of a side valley northeast of Zwiefalten.

=== Upflamör ===
Incorporated on 1 January 1974 (740 m above sea level; 90 inhabitants) Upflamör is the highest hamlet and is located west of Zwiefalten. See also: Conquest Mountain

== Population Development ==
The population figures are census results (¹) or official updates the State Statistical Office (only primary residences).

- Date Population
- December 1, 1871 ¹ 2045
- December 1, 1900 ¹ 2414
- May 17, 1939 ¹ 2559
- September 13, 1950 ¹ 2879
- 6 June 1961 ¹ 3037
- May 27, 1970 ¹ 3000
- May 25, 1987 ¹ 2334
- December 31, 1995 2273
- December 31, 2000 2180
- September 30, 2003 2166
- December 31, 2005 2133
- December 31, 2010 2067
- December 31, 2020 2251

== Council ==
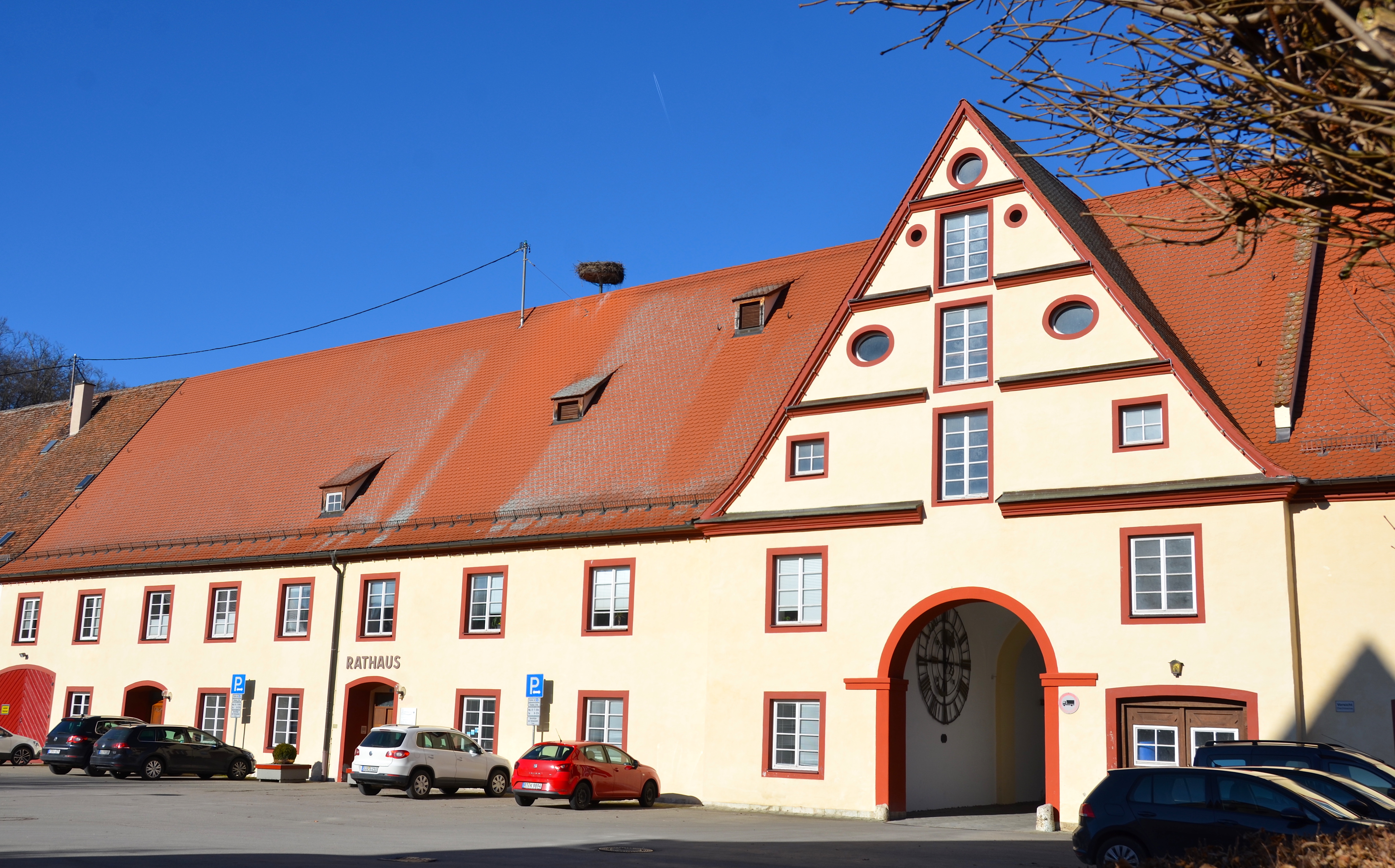
Town hall Zwiefalten

The council of Zwiefalten has after the last election 15 members (2009: 14). The municipal election held on 25 May 2014 led to the following official results. The council consists of the elected honorary councilors and the mayor as chairman. The mayor is entitled to vote in the municipal council.

- CDU / Civil constituency association 72.7% 11 seats (2009: 73.3%, 11 seats)
- Free Voters Zwiefalten / SPD 27.3% 4 seats (2009: 26.7%, 3 seats)

== Mayor ==
The mayor is elected for a term of eight years.

- 1962-1990: Karl Ragg (CDU)
- 1990-2014: Hubertus-Jörg Riedlinger (SPD)
- 2014–2020: Matthias Henne (CDU)
- since 2020: Alexandra Hepp (CDU)

== Crest ==
Blazon: "In Blue superimposed two interlocking silver rings that form three circle segments, in which seven (3: 1: 3). six-pointed golden stars appear" The colors of the emblem have been established with advice from the Archives Directorate Stuttgart in the council meeting on December 15, 1933. The Landratsamt Reutlingen has awarded the flag on March 9, 1982. On a blue background there are two interlocking rings that symbolize the confluence of Zwiefalter-Aach and the Kessel-Aach. The seven golden stars are from the arms of the former counts of Achalm.

== Twinning ==
Zwiefalten is twinned with La Tessoualle, France, since August 12, 1973

== Things ==
Abbey Zwiefalten Zwiefalten is located on the Upper Swabian Baroque Route.

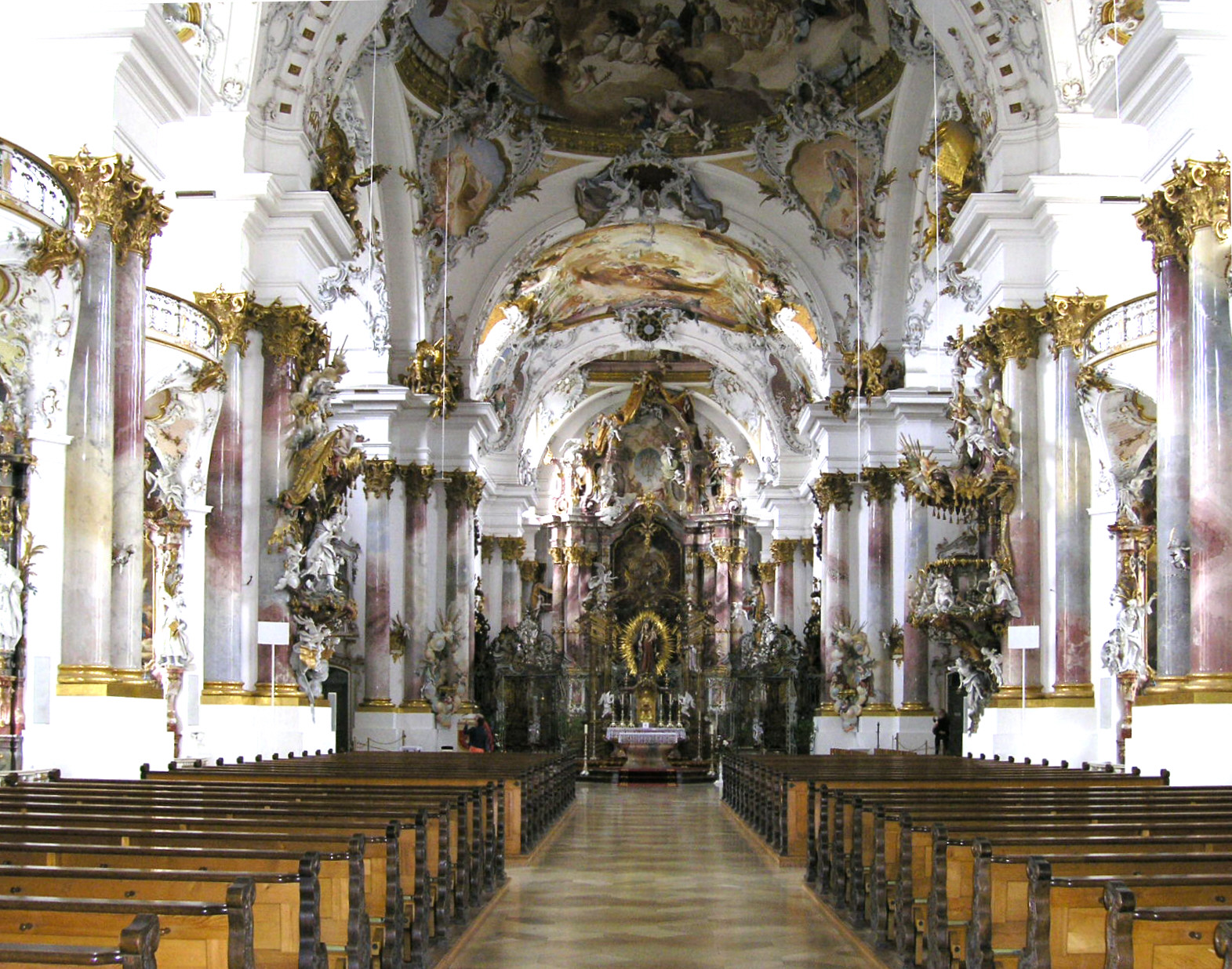
Zwiefalten Abbey

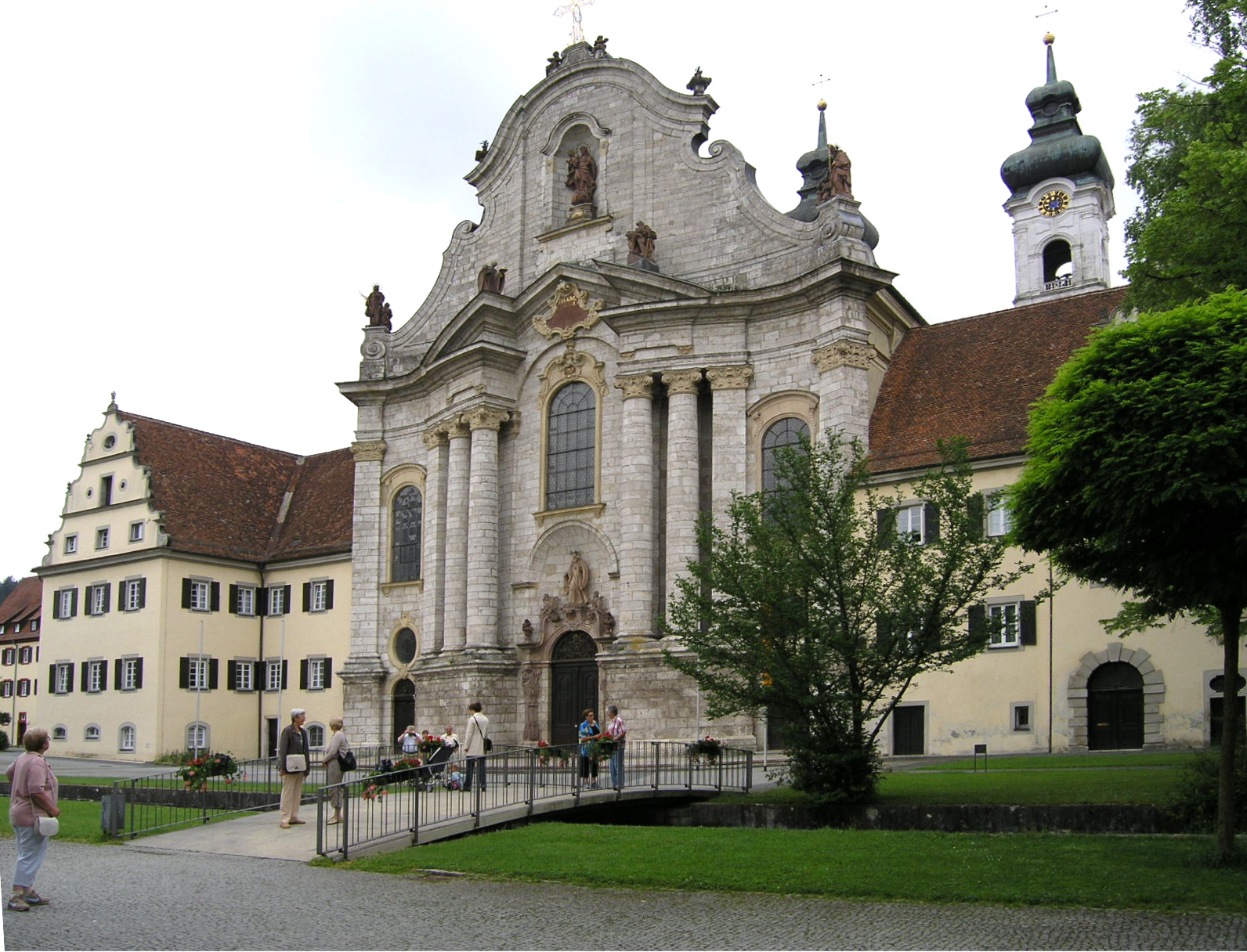
Zwiefalten

== Museums ==
- Württembergian Psychiatry Museum
- Peterstormuseum: Local museum in the former school building

== History ==
Founded at the confluence of two rivers, Zwivaltum was mentioned for the first time in a document by King Ludwig IV dated 15 June 904, but the town's claim to fame is its former Benedictine monastery, the Zwiefalten Abbey, which was founded in 1089 by monks from Hirsau. Counts Luitold von Achalm and Kuno von Wülflingen gave extensive donations the monastery. There was also at one time a convent on the spot, but by the 14th century it was no longer there. Until the 15th century, the monastery was influential, but in 1525 the German Peasants' War resulted in the monastery being plundered.

In 1750 the abbey was granted the status of Reichsabtei, which meant that it had the status of an independent power subject only to the Imperial Crown and was free of the rule of Württemberg. By 1802, however, the monastery was dissolved as part of the German mediatization. Today it is part of the psychiatric hospital.

as Notre-Dame Cathedral, the church in 1806 secularized [8] abbey, considered a masterpiece of the German late Baroque. Construction was started in 1739 by brothers Joseph and Martin Schneider and completed by 1765 by Johann Michael Fischer. The rich interior of the church contains a late Gothic miraculous image of 1430 and baroque frescoed ceilings and an altarpiece by Franz Joseph Spiegler, frescoes by Andreas Meinrad von Au, stucco work by Johann Michael Feuchtmayer d. J., also sculptures and a choir of Johann Joseph Christian.

== Natural monuments ==
- Wimsener Höhle (Wimsen cave), a since 1447 well-known sea cave accessible with a boat. The total length is 723 meters, but only 263 m are measured.
- Zwiefaltendorfer Tropfsteinhöhle (Zwiefaltendorf stalactite cave), with a length of 27 meters the smallest show cave in Germany. Zwiefaltendorf is subsite of Riedlingen.
- Aachtopf (Kesselbach) springs in the valley of Dobel valley, similar to the Blautopf in Blaubeuren.
- Heuneburg (Upflamör) is a Celtic rampart in the forest near Upflamör. The 4.5-hectare (11-acre) site was settled not later than the 7th century BC.
- Schlossberg Sonderbuch with Burgstall Sonderbuch.

== Regular events ==
The Narrenzunft Raelle e. V. operates the Swabian-Alemannic Fastnacht in place.

== Economy and infrastructure ==
=== Transport ===
Zwiefalten is located on the main road B 312. This connects the town to the north with Reutlingen and to the south with Riedlingen. The Public transport is ensured by the Verkehrsverbund Neckar-Alb-Donau (NALDO). The community is located in the comb 227.

== Facilities ==
Zwiefalten has the Münster Hospital Zwiefalten as a psychiatric center. The town was also the seat of the deanery Zwiefalten of the Roman Catholic Diocese of Rottenburg-Stuttgart, which now belongs to the deanery Reutlingen-Zwiefalten headquartered in Reutlingen.

=== Education ===
- Münster School Zwiefalten
- Health and nursing school

== Sons and daughters of the town ==
- Henry (I.) of Zwiefalten (* in the 13th century; † in the 13th century), Benedictine prior of the monastery Ochsenhausen 1238-1263
- Carl von Sallwürk (1802-?), Hohenzollern official
- Gustav Werner (1809-1887), a Protestant pastor and founder of the still existing Gustav-Werner-Foundation

== Personalities who have worked on site ==
- Ernest Weinrauch (1730-1793), composer and Benedictine Father in the monastery Zwiefalten
- Conradin Kreutzer (1780-1849), composer and conductor, visited the Benedictine Abbey Zwiefalten school

== Others ==
- Zwiefalter Klosterbrauerei
- Landschulheim Upflamör
