= Zwiefalter Aach =

River in Germany

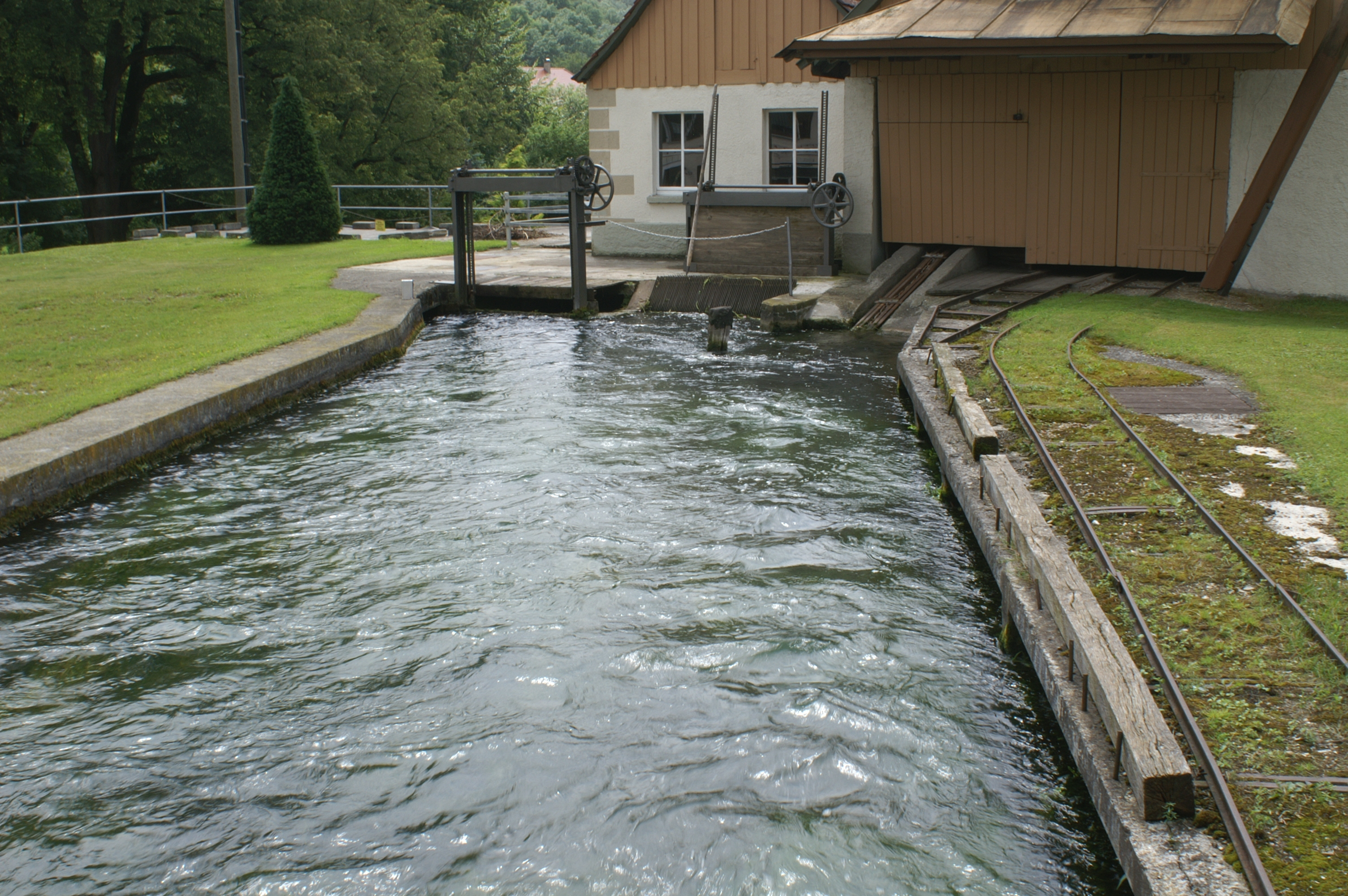
- Zwiefalter Aach in Zwiefaltendorf

- Mouth of the Ziefalter Aach

Location
- Country: Germany
- State: Baden-Württemberg

Physical characteristics
- Mouth
  - location: Danube
  - coordinates: 48°15′33″N 9°26′53″E
- Length: 8.9 km (5.5 mi)

Basin features
- Progression: Danube→ Black Sea

The Zwiefalter Aach or Zwiefalter Ach is a river in Reutlingen district and Biberach district in Baden-Württemberg, Germany. It is approximately 9 kilometres long and is a tributary of the Danube near Zwiefalten. The river is known for the Wimsener Höhle.
