= Schrempf (surname) =

Schrempf is a German surname. Notable people with the surname include:

- Christoph Schrempf (1860–1944), German evangelical theologian and philosopher
- Detlef Schrempf (born 1963), German basketball player
- Friedrich Schrempf (1858–1912), editor and member of the German Reichstag
- Romana Schrempf (born 1986), Austrian biathlete and cross-country skier

== See also ==
- Schrimpf
- Schrumpf
