= Reichskrieg (1311–1312) =

1311–1312 war

The Reichskrieg was a war fought in 1311 and 1312 by the imperial cities of the Holy Roman Empire against Eberhard I, Count of Württemberg, known as 'Eberhard the Illustrious Highness'.

== Course ==
Eberhard I supported the Bohemian estates and the Bohemian king, Henry of Carinthia in their conflict against Emperor Albert I of Habsburg and his successor, Henry VII. In 1309, charges were brought against Eberhard because of the grasping, self-serving way he discharged his duties as Landvogt, and he was therefore summoned by Henry VII to a Hoftag at Speyer. Eberhard left Speyer prematurely, whereupon Henry imposed the Imperial Ban on him. Henry now supported the Swabian imperial cities in their confrontation with Count Eberhard of Württemberg, who had also operated an aggressive territorial policy against the cities. Because Henry was going to Italy, he appointed the new Reichslandvogt, Conrad IV of Weinsberg, as the army commander of the Swabian imperial cities and several nobles. The principal Swabian cities involved were Esslingen am Neckar and Reutlingen; the nobles included von Tübingen, von Vaihingen and Herter of Dusslingen.

In spring 1311 the Reichskrieg began, the first military action presumably being the siege of enemy's family castle, Wirtemberg, which took place at the beginning of May. After a failed relief attempt on 26 May, the castle was captured on 13 July. After the Hohenasperg Castle fell in August 1312, Eberhard, now a fugitive, was received by his Baden brother-in-law, Margrave Rudolf Hesso in one of the two bergfrieds of Besigheim.

Only the death of Henry VII on 24 August 1313, and the political situation after the king's election in 1314, when Louis IV was crowned king and Frederick the Fair was declared as counter-king, prevented Württemberg's defeat. Eberhard then cleverly manoeuvered between king and counter-king, so that he was not only able to compensate himself for his territorial losses but also gain additional territories.

The Reichsheer captured or destroyed inter alia the following castles: Wirtemberg, Hohenasperg, Hohenjungingen, Ror, Old Lichtenstein, Haideck, Hochbiedeck, Greifenstein, Untergreifenstein, Dischingen near Stuttgart (thanks to coins discovered at the site by G. Weindefenung its destruction was dated to the early 14th century). and Marbach am Neckar.

The following were not captured: Hohenneuffen, Hohenurach and town, Hohenwittlingen Castle and Seeburg.

== Literature ==
- Hans-Martin Maurer: Geschichte Württembergs in Bildern. Kohlhammer, Stuttgart, 1992, ISBN 3-17-010960-X
- Theodor Schön: Schloß Wirtemberg in Blättern des Schwäbischen Albvereins. 1897
- Erwin Haas: Die sieben württembergischen Landesfestungen. ISBN 3-921638-59-3
- Jürgen Meyer: Zerstört ward alles, stehen blieb kein Stein. In: Im Schatten der Vergangenheit. Oertel + Spörer, 2004, ISBN 3-88627-270-2
