= Schimpf =

Schimpf, Schimpff
Origin
- Language: German
- Meaning: playful, humorous
- Region of origin: Germany

Other names
- Variant forms: Scherzer, Kurzweil

Schimpf is a German surname, which originally meant a humorous or playful person, from the Middle High German schimpf, meaning "play" or "amusement". The name may refer to:

- Axel Schimpf (born 1952), German admiral
- Richard Schimpf (1897–1972), German general
- Rolf Schimpf (1924–2025), German actor
- Ryan Schimpf (born 1988), Major League Baseball player

== See also ==
- Schimpff's Confectionery, Jefferson, Indiana
- Schrimpf
