= Besigheim =

- Municipality
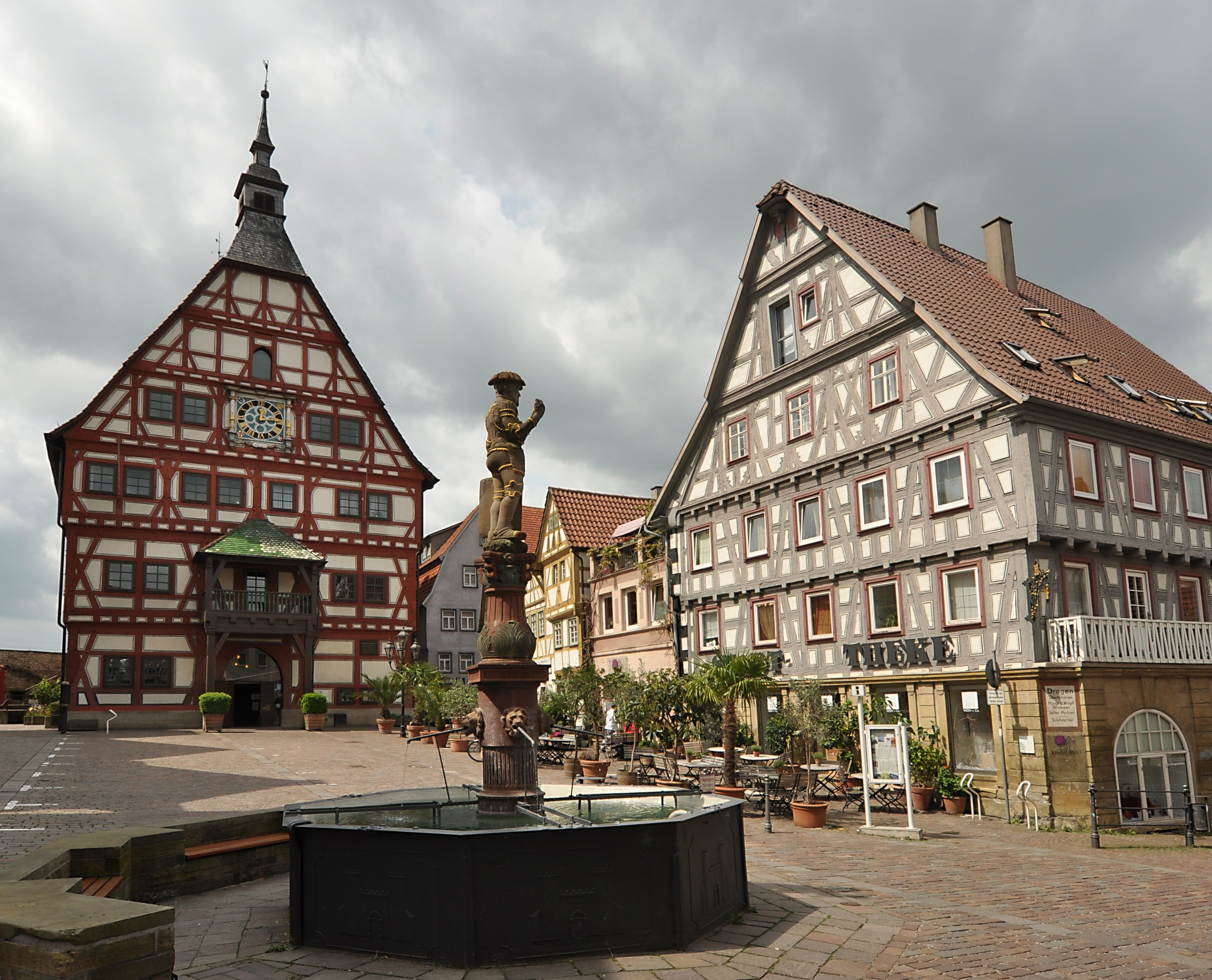

- Coat of arms

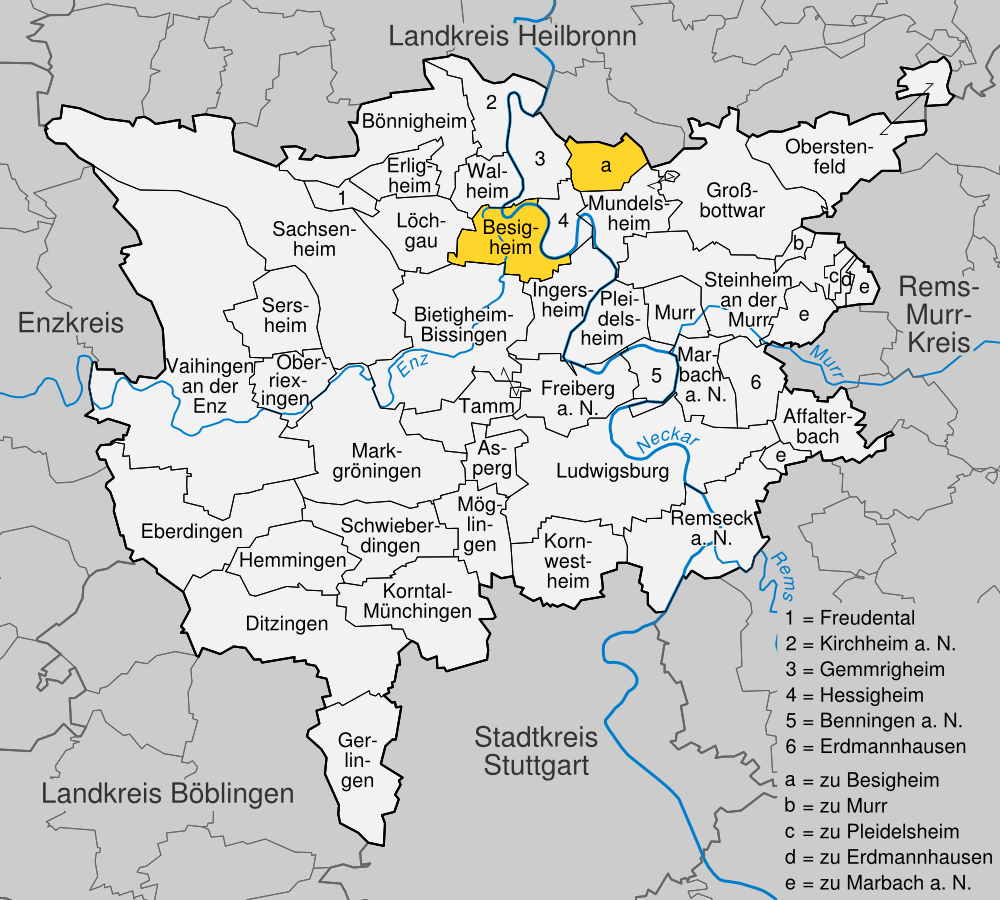
- Location of Besigheim within Ludwigsburg district
- Interactive map of Besigheim
- Location within Germany Location within Baden-Württemberg
- Coordinates: 48°59.9′N 9°8.5′E
- Country: Germany
- State: Baden-Württemberg
- Admin. region: Stuttgart
- District: Ludwigsburg
- Founded: 12th century

Government
  - Mayor (2024–32): Florian Bargmann

Area
  - Total: 16.83 km^{2} (6.50 sq mi)

Population (2025-12-31)
  - Total: 12,159
  - Density: 722.5/km^{2} (1,871/sq mi)
- Time zone: UTC+01:00 (CET)
  - Summer (DST): UTC+02:00 (CEST)
- Postal codes: 74354
- Dialling codes: 07143
- Vehicle registration: LB
- Website: www.besigheim.de

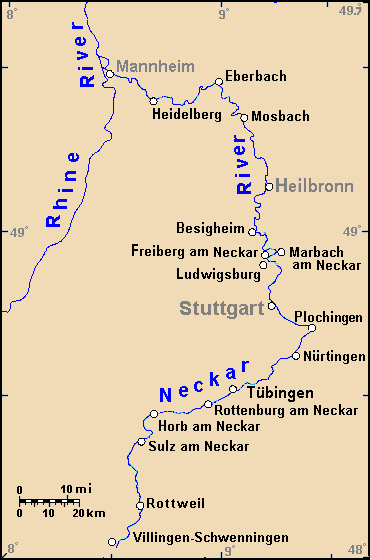
Besigheim on Neckar River

Besigheim (German pronunciation: [ˈbeːzɪçhaɪm]) is a municipality in the district of Ludwigsburg in Baden-Württemberg in southern Germany.

It is situated 13 km north of Ludwigsburg at the confluence of the Neckar and Enz rivers. The town has many old buildings and a town hall that dates back to 1459. There are two medieval towers, Gothic church, cobblestone market place and other historical objects of interest.

== History ==
Besigheim was founded in the 12th century as a well-defended walled city. The first mention of the city in official documentation was in 1153 in a decree by King Friedrich I.

In 1693, the fortifications were all but destroyed by French troops, and by 1750 were little more than rubble.

== International relations ==
Besigheim is twinned with:

- Aÿ, France.
- (United Kingdom) Newton Abbot, England.
- Bátaszék, Hungary.

== Notable people ==
- John Zeller (1830–1902), Protestant missionary in Ottoman Israel.
- Friedrich Schrempf (1858–1912), editor and member of the German Reichstag
- Christoph Schrempf (1860–1944), evangelical theologian and philosopher
- William Frank (1878–1965), athlete, bronze medallist in the marathon at the 1906 Intercalated Games
- Werner Villinger (1887–1961), Nazi Germany child and youth psychiatrist
- Luisa Richter (1928–2015), a Venezuelan-based graphic artist and professor
- Hans Mezger (1929-2020), an engineer famous for the engines designed at Porsche for the 911 and many racecars. His 911 engine had been used and developed for around four decades until 2010.
