= Schrumpf =

Schrumpf is a surname of German origin, originating as a nickname for a wrinkly person. Notable people with the surname include:

- Augusta Schrumpf (1813-1900), Norwegian dramatic actress and operatic soprano
- Fabian Schrumpf (born 1982), German politician
- Jan Schrumpf (1921-2007), Dutch professional footballer
- Mildred Brown Schrumpf (1903-2001), American home economist, food educator, and author

== See also ==
- Schrimpf
- Schrempf (surname)
