= Grabenstetten =

- Municipality
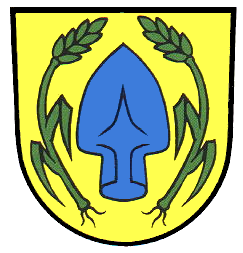
- Coat of arms

- Location of Grabenstetten within Reutlingen district
- Interactive map of Grabenstetten
- Location within Germany Location within Baden-Württemberg
- Coordinates: 48°31′24″N 09°27′41″E
- Country: Germany
- State: Baden-Württemberg
- Admin. region: Tübingen
- District: Reutlingen

Government
  - Mayor (2017–25): Roland Deh

Area
  - Total: 14.53 km^{2} (5.61 sq mi)
- Elevation: 688 m (2,257 ft)

Population (2025-12-31)
  - Total: 1,724
  - Density: 118.7/km^{2} (307.3/sq mi)
- Time zone: UTC+01:00 (CET)
  - Summer (DST): UTC+02:00 (CEST)
- Postal codes: 72582
- Dialling codes: 07382
- Vehicle registration: RT
- Website: www.grabenstetten.de

Grabenstetten is a municipality in the district of Reutlingen in Baden-Württemberg in Germany.

It lies within the area of the Celtic Heidengraben.

== Municipality arrangement ==
Besides the homonymous village Grabenstetten there are no other places that belong to Grabenstetten.

== Neighboring communities ==
To Grabenstetten borders the municipalities and towns Erkenbrechtsweiler ¹, Lenningen ¹, Römerstein, Bad Urach and Hülben. The list is based on the clockwise beginning in the north. The named part of the district of Reutlingen or the Esslingen district ¹:

== Historical Geography ==
In the municipality lies the ruin Hofen.

== History ==
The Alemannic expanding settlement Grabenstetten is first mentioned in the 1st half of the 12th century as "Grabanostetten" and 1152 under the name "Grabanostettin". Only in 1635 the Thirty Years' War (1618–1648) came to Grabenstetten. Soldiers set fire in their departure to the place, except for the church, the rectory, the school and a few smaller homes the whole place burned down. The following year, 325 people died of hunger and disease. The bailiff of Neuffen told the Duke that no more than 6 people lived in Grabenstetten. The reconstruction after the fire of 1635 was very slow. 1664 lived only 13 families in the village. Until 1842 Grabenstetten belonged to the Oberamt Nürtingen, then it was reclassified to the Oberamt Urach. After the dissolution of Oberamt Urach in 1938, Grabenstetten fell to the district of Reutlingen.

== Religions ==
Since 1275 Grabenstetten has a church. The Reformation was, as elsewhere in the Duchy of Württemberg, introduced in 1534.

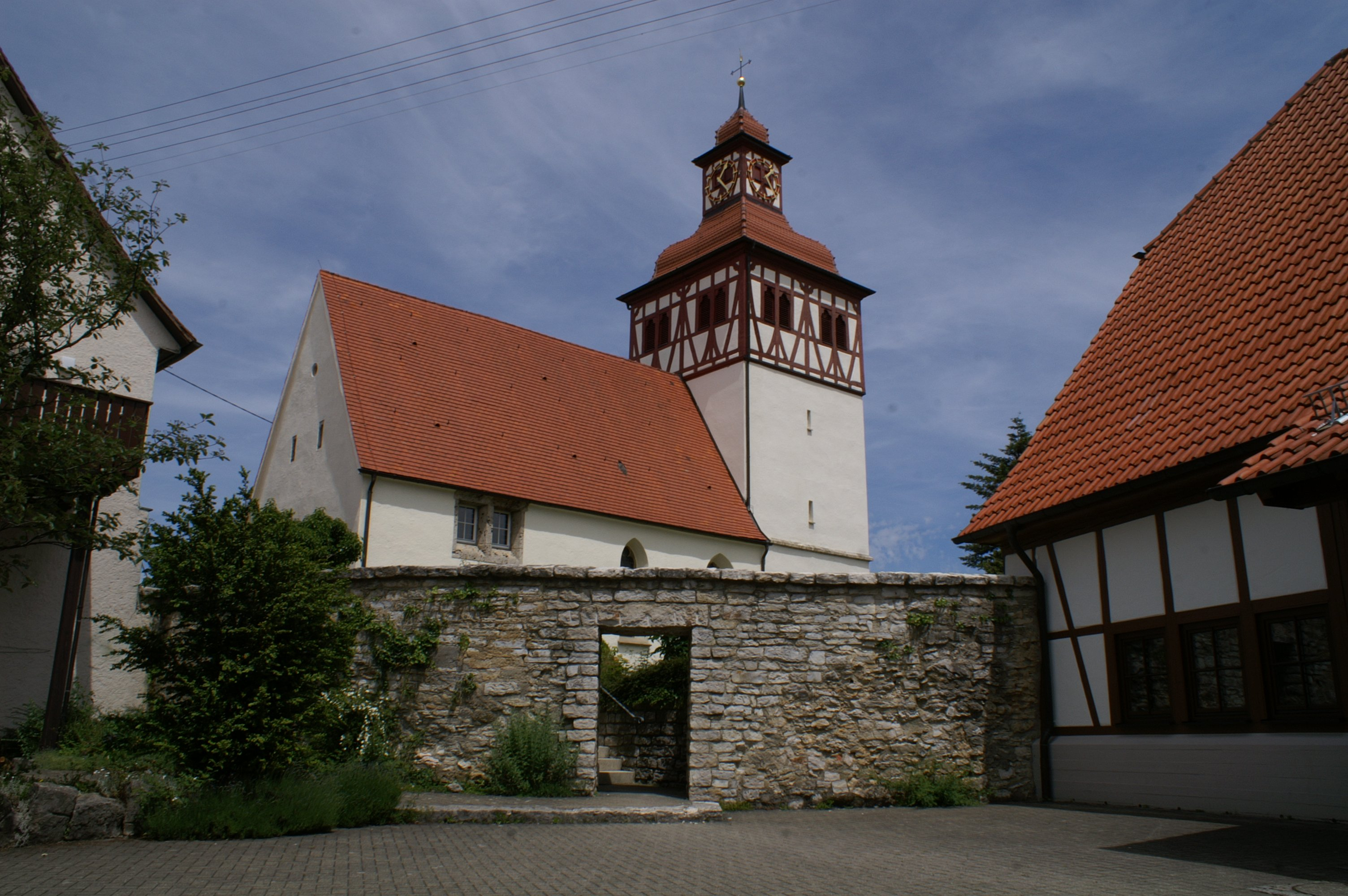
Grabenstetten Peter-and Paul-Kirche

== Mayor ==
The mayor is elected for a term of eight years. The current incumbent Harald Steidl (CDU) was re-elected in October 2010 with 94.8% of the vote.

== Crest ==
Blazon: In gold (yellow), a fallen blue plowshare, both sides accompanied by one each rooted, curved green ear. The municipality flag has the colors green-yellow (green-gold). The coat of arms, whose figures indicate agriculture, goes back to a "Fleckensigill" from 1825. Emblem and flag were officially awarded by the Ministry of the Interior of Baden-Württemberg on 14 November 1967.

== Museums ==
- Early History Museum, established in 1998
- Working Group Culture and History, founded in 2004
- Friend's association Heidengraben founded 2005

== Buildings ==
- Ruin Hofen, from the 13th century

Tumulus

- The Heidengraben, the largest Celtic oppidum in Germany and one of the largest in Europe

== Teams ==
=== Sports ===
- Gymnastic and sports club Grabenstetten 1913
- Motor sports club Grabenstetten, founded on February 13, 1987
- Gunners club Grabenstetten
- Flyers club Grabenstetten

=== Music ===
- Gesangsverein Liederkranz Grabenstetten (choir)

=== Other ===
- Fruit and horticulture association
- Swabian Alb Association
- Friend's association Cave and Karst Grabenstetten
- Youth Club Grabenstetten founded 2009

== Natural monuments ==
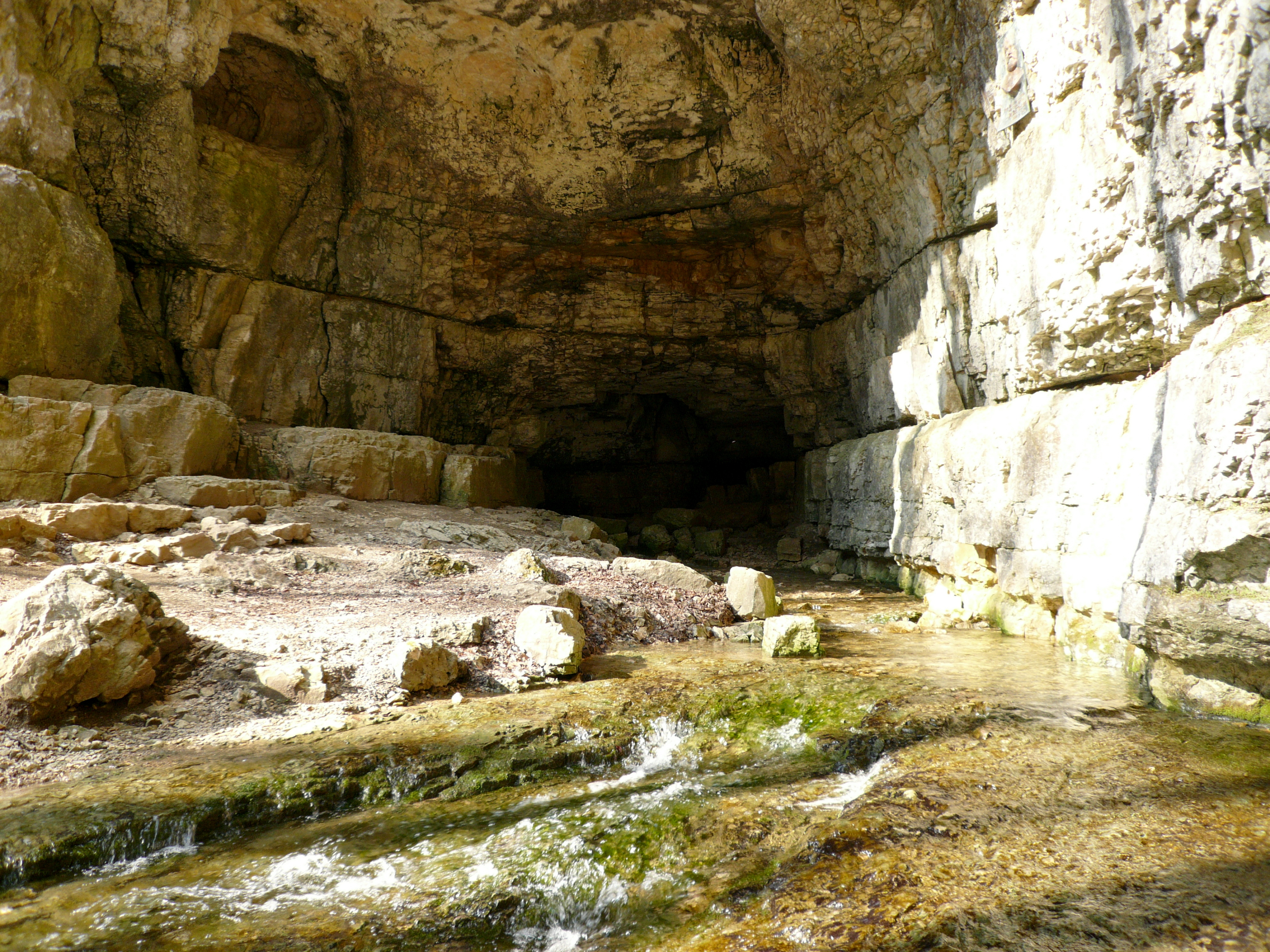
Falkensteiner Höhle

- The Falkenstein cave lies at the Jura edge between Grabenstetten and Bad Urach. The 5 km long cave is an active water cave, that means precipitation seeping goes through the karst of the Jura plateau and goes through the cave to the outside. The water of the cave is the source of the Elsach.
- The Gustav-Jakob cave is about 427 m long. It lies under the ruins Hofen.

== Regular events ==
- Kandelfescht: street festival of local clubs, usually every year on the second weekend in July.

== Economy and Infrastructure ==
=== Transportation ===
The National Road 211 connects the town to the west with Bad Urach and to the east with Lenningen. The Public transport is guarantedby the Verkehrsverbund Neckar-Alb-Donau (NALDO). The community is located in the comb 221. Grabenstetten has an airfield, which is operated by the Fliegergruppe Grabenstetten-Teck-Lenningen Valley.

=== Education ===
Grabenstetten has with the Rulaman school its own primary school. More Schools are available in the neighboring towns. For the youngest residents, there is a kindergarten in Protestant sponsorship.

== Personality ==
=== Sons and daughters of the town ===
- Wilhelm Christian Steeb (1788–1871), minister, deputy of (parliament)
- David Friedrich Weinland (1828–1915), scientist and writer (Rulaman)
