= Schrimpf =

Schrimpf is a surname. Notable people with the surname include:

- Charles M. Schrimpf (1890–1932), American politician and businessman
- Georg Schrimpf (1889–1938), German painter and graphic artist
- Ronald D. Schrimpf (born 1959), American electrical engineer and scientist

== See also ==
- Schimpf
- Schrempf (surname)
- Schrumpf
