= Erkenbrechtsweiler =

- Municipality
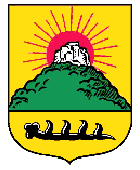
- Coat of arms

- Location of Erkenbrechtsweiler within Esslingen district
- Interactive map of Erkenbrechtsweiler
- Location within Germany Location within Baden-Württemberg
- Coordinates: 48°33′24″N 9°25′56″E
- Country: Germany
- State: Baden-Württemberg
- Admin. region: Stuttgart
- District: Esslingen

Government
  - Mayor (2018–26): Roman Weiß

Area
  - Total: 6.93 km^{2} (2.68 sq mi)
- Elevation: 746 m (2,448 ft)

Population (2025-12-31)
  - Total: 1,968
  - Density: 284/km^{2} (736/sq mi)
- Time zone: UTC+01:00 (CET)
  - Summer (DST): UTC+02:00 (CEST)
- Postal codes: 73268
- Dialling codes: 07026
- Vehicle registration: ES
- Website: www.erkenbrechtsweiler.de

Erkenbrechtsweiler in Esslingen district

Erkenbrechtsweiler is a municipality in the district of Esslingen in Baden-Württemberg in southern Germany.

It lies within the area of the Celtic Heidengraben.

Erkenbrechtsweiler is the only municipality in the district of Esslingen, whose denunciation lies fully on the Jura plateau.

== Municipality arrangement ==
Erkenbrechtsweiler includes the village Erkenbrechtsweiler and the place Burrenhof. In the north of the municipality in the hallway "Burg" is a living space disposed likely from Frankish times.

== Neighboring communities ==
Adjacent community are Neuffen in the West, Beuren in the northwest, Owen in the north, Lenningen in the East (all Esslingen district), Grabenstetten and Hülben the south (both district Reutlingen).

== History ==
A grave mound from the Bronze Age proves that already in the Bronze Age people lived in the district. Remains from the Hallstatt culture period have been found. Erkenbrechtsweiler was first documented in 1284 as "Hergenbolswiler" or "Erggenboltswilaer" when Berthold from Neuffen rendered the place to the Bishopric of Speyer. In 1301 the place was sold together with the reign Neuffen to the Counts of Württemberg. The place came in 1938 to the newly formed district Nürtingen and in 1973 to the district of Esslingen.

== Religions ==
Since the Reformation Erkenbrechtsweiler is dominated Protestant. The parish includes the municipality Erkenbrechtsweiler and since 2004 also the district Hochwang of the municipality Lenningen. It has about 1,700 members (as of 2005).

In addition, there is now a New Apostolic Church. Roman Catholic Christians, however have to go to church service in Lenningen-Hochwang.

== Population Development ==
The population figures are census results (¹) or official updates the State Statistical Office (only primary residences). Deadline Population

- December 3, 1834 ¹ 538
- December 1, 1871 ¹ 686
- December 1, 1900 ¹ 789
- May 17, 1939 ¹ 957
- September 13, 1950 ¹ 1,246
- 6 June 1961 ¹ 1,314
- May 27, 1970 ¹ 1,446
- May 25, 1987 ¹ 1,831
- December 31, 1995 2,012
- December 31, 2000 2,173
- December 31, 2005 2,133

== Council ==
The council in Erkenbrechtsweiler has 10 members. The council consists of the elected honorary councilors and the mayor as chairman. The mayor is entitled to vote in the municipal council.

== Crest ==
Official Blazon : ". About a golden (yellow), with a horizontal black deer rack occupied sign foot a green mountain with silver (white) Pinnacle, behind the rising red sun". The stag rod has the affiliation to Württemberg towards which also marked with this symbol in the coat of arms. The mountain with the rock represents the location on the escarpment. The coat of arms was awarded to Erkenbrechtsweiler by decision of the Provincial Government from 20 September 1954.

== Economy and Infrastructure ==
=== Transportation ===
Erkenbrechtsweiler is located in the Verkehrs- und Tarifverbund Stuttgart. The bus lines 172 and 179 connect the municipality with the nearest railway stations, namely Lenningen to the Teck Railway to Kirchheim (Teck) and Neuffen to the Nürtingen-Neuffen railway to Nürtingen.

=== Education ===
In Erkenbrechtsweiler there is a primary school with a branch office in Hochwang. There is also a kindergarten.

== Natural monuments ==
The Heidengraben, a Celtic oppidum (a heavily fortified city), was built around 100 BC. It is situated on a peninsula-like plateau between the Erms - and Lauter valley and has a total of about 16 square kilometers, the largest facility of its kind in Central Europe. North of Erkenbrechtsweiler is a reconstructed target. Towards the south, the oppidum was secured by two walls, one of which is south of Grabenstetten still well preserved. An archaeological trail with information panels describes the system for the visitors. The biotope Molach lies above a Volcanic pipe of the only in the upper Miocene active volcano ( Swabian volcano ). The Maar-like kettle of Molach is one of the rarities of the Jura. Very many other wet places or ponds (Hülen) led to the settlement.

== Sons and daughters of the town ==
- Friedrich von Römer (1794–1864), politician, member of the Frankfurt National Assembly, Member of Parliament (Württemberg), Württembergian Minister of Justice (1848–49)
- Karin Roth (born 1949), politician (SPD), Member of Parliament, Parliamentary State Secretary at the Federal Ministry of Transport, Building and Urban Development (2005–2009), Senator for Labour, Health and Social Affairs of Hamburg (1998–2001).

== Personalities who have worked locally ==
- August Laemmle (1876–1962), Swabian dialect poet, worked as an elementary school teacher in Erkenbrechtsweiler.

== Literature ==
- Hans Schwenkel: Heimatbuch des Kreises Nürtingen. Band 2. Würzburg 1953, S. 207–222.
- Adolf Schicketanz: Die Chronik von Erkenbrechtsweiler. Erkenbrechtsweiler 1961.
- Der Landkreis Esslingen. Hrsg. vom Landesarchiv Baden-Württemberg i. V. mit dem Landkreis Esslingen, Jan Thorbecke Verlag, Ostfildern 2009, ISBN 978-3-7995-0842-1, Band 1, Seiten 418–428.
- Gemeinde Erkenbrechtsweiler (Hrsg.): Erkenbrechtsweiler: Erkenbodswiler (1359), Erkenboltzwyler (1475); Bilder erzählen unsere Geschichte. Geiger-Verlag, Horb 2009. ISBN 978-3-86595-310-0
