= Heidengraben =

Oppidum in Germany

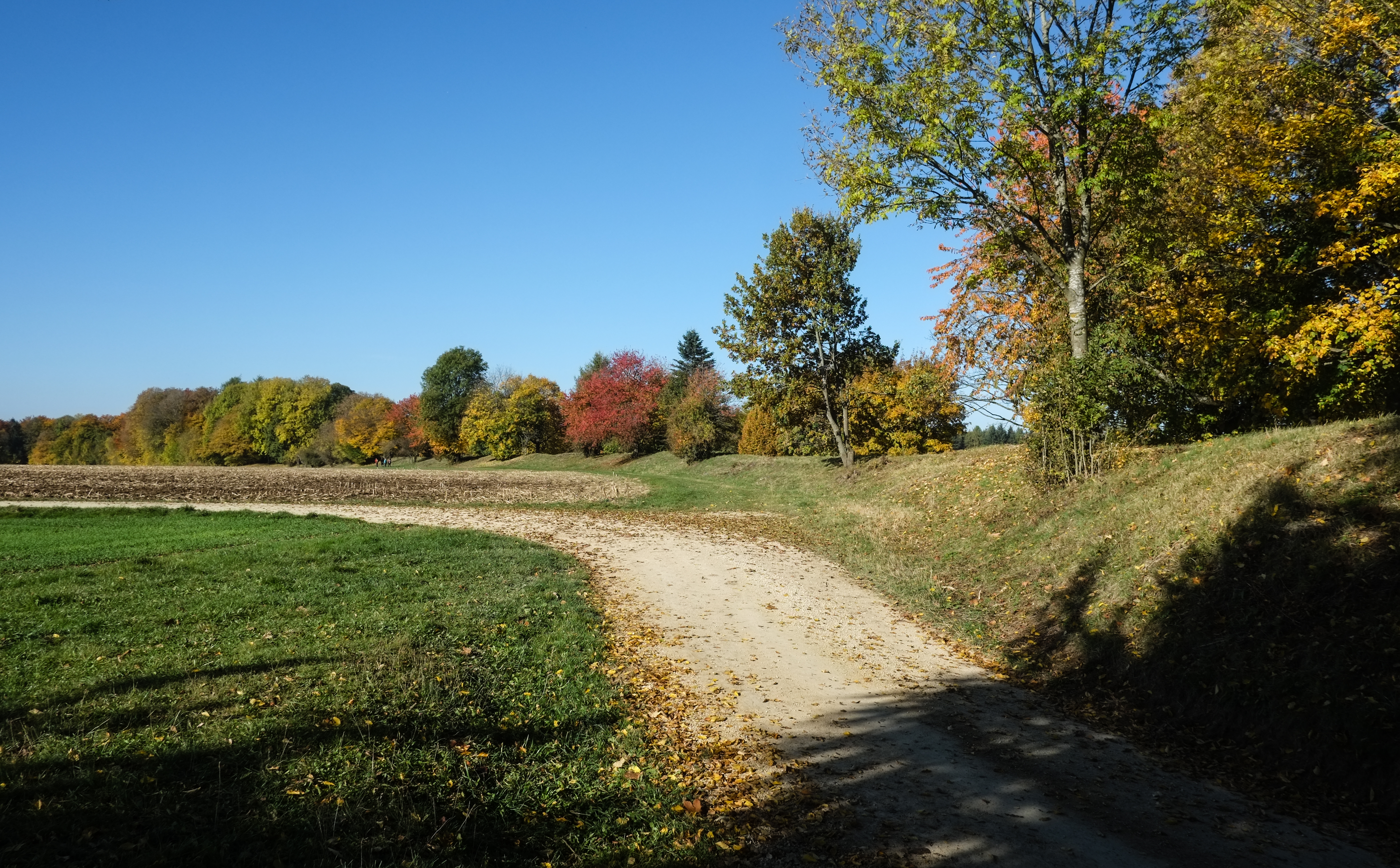

- Location within Germany
- 48.533°N 9.45°E
- Type: Circular rampart or oppidum, burial mounds
- Periods: Iron Age
- Cultures: Celts, La Tène
- Location: Swabian Jura, Baden-Württemberg
- Region: Germany

History
- Built: late 2nd century BC
- Built by: Celts
- Abandoned: early 1st century BC

Site notes
- Material: stone, earth, wood
- Area: c. 1,700 hectares
- Public access: Yes

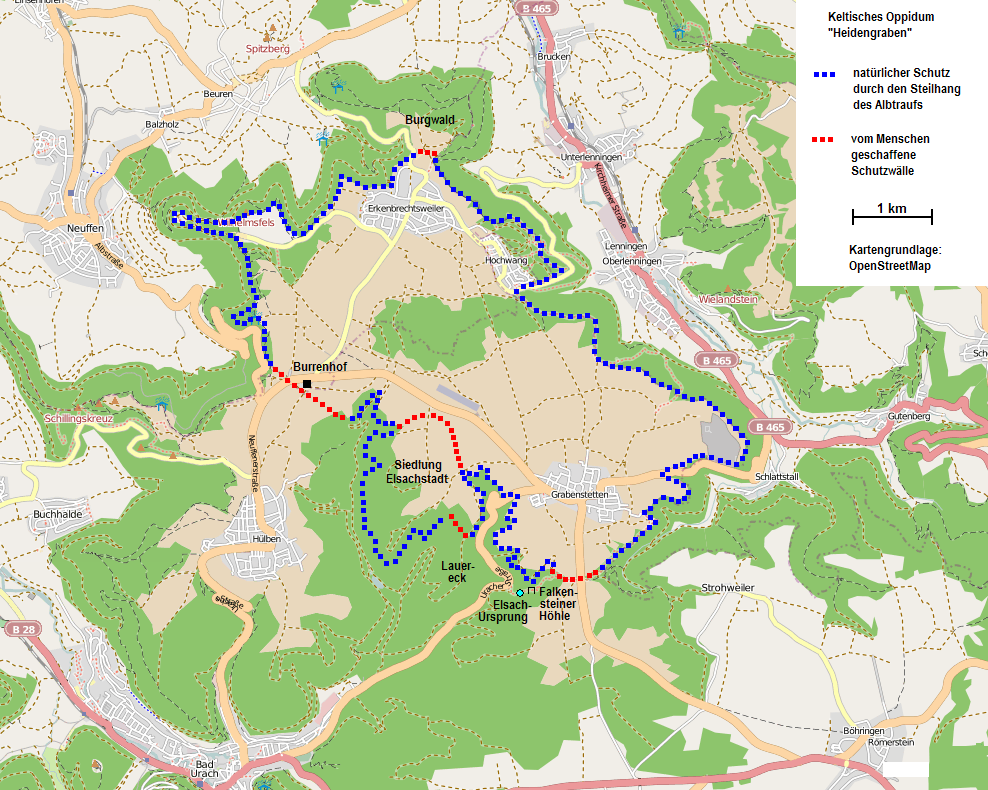
Map of the Heidengraben

Heidengraben ("pagans' moat") is the name given to the remains of a large Celtic fortified settlement (oppidum) dating to the Iron Age, located on the plateau of the Swabian Jura (Schwäbische Alb) in the districts of Reutlingen and Esslingen in Baden-Württemberg, Germany. The settlement was in use from the 2nd century BC to 1st century BC, during the La Tène period. By surface area, Heidengraben is the largest oppidum in all of mainland Europe.

== Geography ==
Heidengraben is situated in the municipalities of Grabenstetten, Hülben and Erkenbrechtsweiler in the districts of Reutlingen and Esslingen in southern Germany. It sits on a part of the high plateau of the Swabian Jura at the steep escarpment known as Albtrauf which rises as much as 400 m (1,300 ft) above the foothills. This area is known as the Grabenstettener Halbinsel. Height above sea level is around 700 m (2,300 ft).

The outer fortifications delineate an area of over 1,700 hectares, making this oppidum the largest known in mainland Europe. The 2.5 km-long (1.6 mi) walls make strategic use of the escarpment to create this large area surrounded either by wall or steep bluff. The walls cut off the inner area from the rest of the plateau and also divide it from three sections that are hard to fortify or oversee. In front of the wall was a moat. The rampart, in parts still about 3 m (9.8 ft) high, has eight gates – variants of the late Celtic Zangentor. One of them, with a 35 m-long (115 ft) entryway, is one of the largest and best-preserved of its kind.

The inner fortification, to the south-west, named Elsachstadt, likely marking the core of the Celtic settlement, covers around 153 hectares. It is surrounded by part of the outer wall and another inner rampart with a double moat and three gates. Not much is known about the internal settlement structures, however, as the buildings were made of wood and the area has been subject to erosion and been used for agriculture for centuries. Only the Elsachstadt was apparently also fortified in the direction of the escarpment.

Overall, there are around half a dozen wall segments visible today, varying in length from a few hundred to over 1,000 m (3,300 ft). They are what is known as Pfostenschlitzmauern constructed of rocks, wood and earth.

== History ==
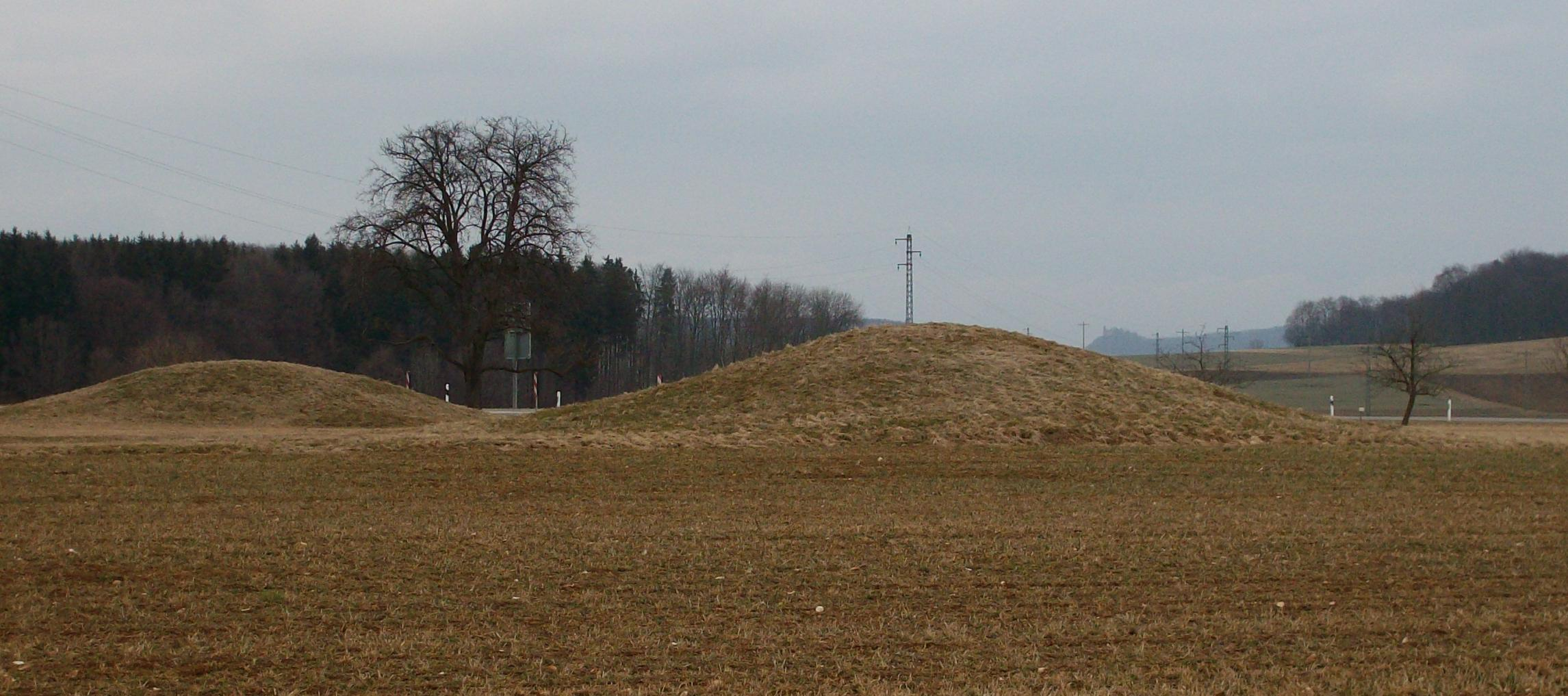
Burial mounds at Burrenhof

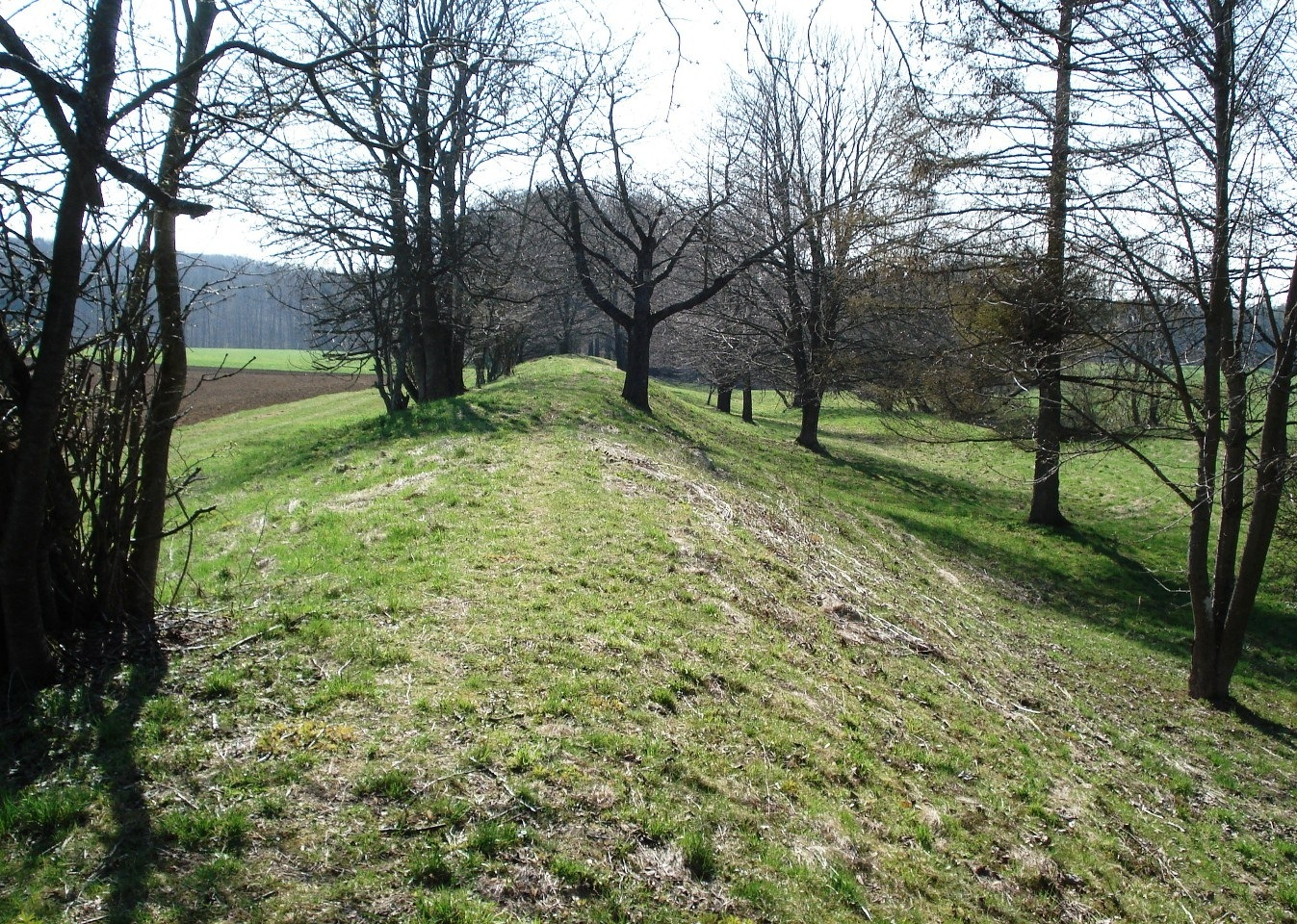
Heidengraben at Elsachstadt

Stone artefacts indicate that humans frequented the area from the Ice Age to the 3rd millennium BC. There is some evidence that the area was inhabited since the Neolithic period. However, findings make it more likely that it was not used for settlement by Neolithic farmers but for gaining access to Hornstein. There is just one grave dating to the middle Bronze Age (1600-1300 BC) but several graves nearby date to the late Bronze Age and some burial mounds (with wooden chambers) are from the early Iron Age.

In several locations settlement remains contemporaneous to the necropolis (late Hallstatt period and early La Tène period) have been found in the area that later became the Heidengraben.

The Heidengraben was likely created in the late La Tène period (late 2nd century BC to early 1st century BC). However, in the period of 250 to 150 BC the area seems to have been once again unpopulated. Archaeological findings indicate the presence of a simple agricultural population as well as specialized artisans (metal working, glass production). In addition, a large number of shards from Roman amphorae dating to 130 to 90 BC indicate that a significant amount of Roman wine was imported. This implies the existence of a rich elite that could afford these luxury items. No evidence of a burial site dating to the oppidum period has been discovered, but the earlier necropolis seems to have been used as a cult site and possibly for burial rituals.

Why and exactly when the settlement was abandoned remains unclear. It appears that the inhabitants left it in the first half of the 1st century BC, but there is no indication of any reasons. This dating fits in with the abandonment of other oppida in that era, pointing to some fundamental changes in social, economic or political circumstances.

Around 85 AD the Romans occupied the Swabian Jura and there were some farms or mansiones in the area. The Romans left c. 260 AD. The next signs of inhabitants date to the 7th century, when the area was settled by Alemanni.

In the Middle Ages the area was only sparsely inhabited but some castles were constructed nearby like Hohenneuffen Castle (early 12th century) or Burg Hofen east of Grabenstein. The purpose of a medieval fortification surrounding 55 hectares to the north of Heidengraben (known as Bassgeige) is still unknown. It incorporates parts of a Celtic wall but was extended in late medieval times. Several similar structures nearby (Brucker Fels and Beurener Fels) also served an unknown purpose.

== Research ==
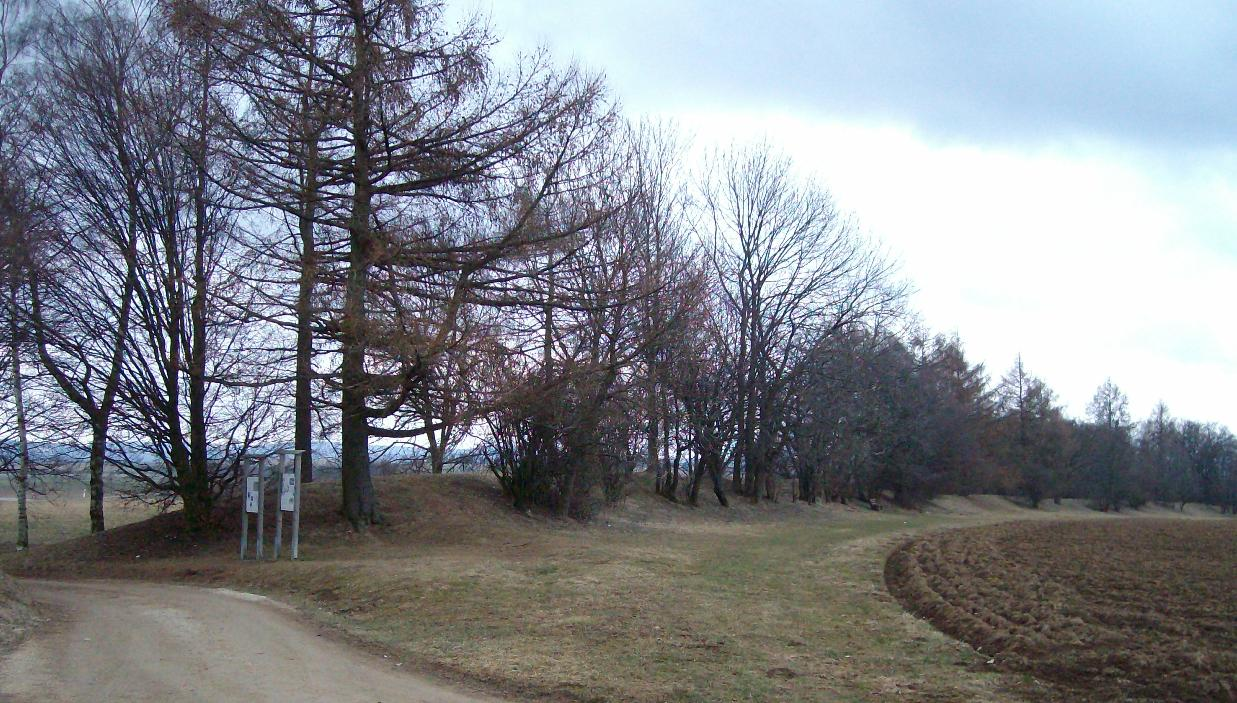
Remains of Heidengraben ramparts

The Heidengraben is mentioned as early as the 15th century as "Haidengraben". It was first the subject of scientific studies in the 19th century. It was identified as a pre-historic rampart by Eduard Paulus (1837-1907) in a sort of guide book published by Gustav Schwab Die Schwäbische Alb mit besonderer Berücksichtigung der Neckarseite in 1878. Initially, most observers attributed the structures as Roman in origin. Friedrich Hertlein (1865-1929) conducted excavations that identified the structure as late Iron Age, an oppidum in the sense used by Julius Caesar in his Commentarii de Bello Gallico. Hertlein also coined the name Elsachstadt based on the nearby source of the Elsach.

Excavations at the burial site near the Burrenhof since the mid-19th century and in particular after 1983 have yielded significant numbers of findings, pointing to a use by some nearby settlement from the Urnfield period (after 1200 BC) to the late Hallstatt period (6th century BC). Valuable funerary goods indicate the presence of a social elite at that time. Some of the over 30 burial mounds have been recreated after having been removed by farming and excavation work.

Although there were rescue excavations at several points in 1974, 1976 and 1981, the first systematic excavations of the Heidengraben itself took place only in 1994–99. These investigated just 1% of the area inside the inner wall and found evidence of widely spaced farm estates typical of oppida.

The Heidengraben offered its residents a number of advantages: It was close to very fertile land, 800 hectares of which were actually inside the outer wall. There was plenty of fresh water nearby, a rarity in the uplands of the Swabian Jura due to its permeable geology. It was located close to important long-distance trading routes, including the Danube and Neckar and the Albaufgänge (passes) connecting the two rivers. Immediately beneath Heidengraben was the Lenninger Tal offering access to Lake Constance (and later the site of a Roman road). The oppidum's inhabitants thus were well placed to profit from the trade flows passing through.

In 1930, de:Paul Reinecke equated the site with a Celtic town named Riusiava in the area of southern Germany by Ptolemy in his Geography. This was later supported by Rolf Nierhaus. However, no hard evidence has been discovered actually linking this oppidum with Riusiava. Similarly, theories that Heidengraben was the capital of the Tigurini are highly speculative.

== Today ==
Much of the area is accessible to the public and there is an archaeological hiking trail called Achsnagelweg. In Grabenstetten, there is a museum (Keltenmuseum). Other findings can be viewed at the museum of the University of Tübingen.

== Gallery ==
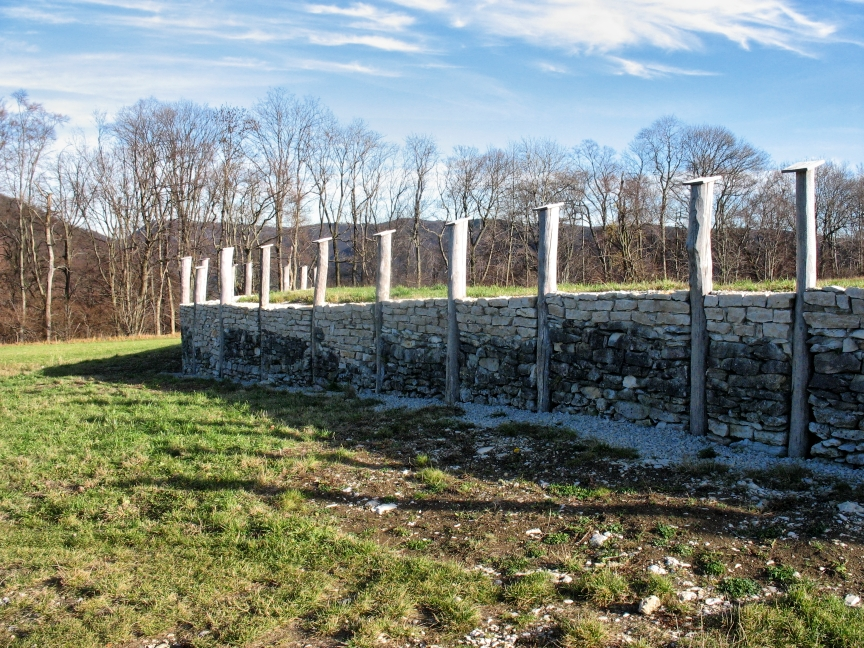
Partly reconstructed murus gallicus fortification wall

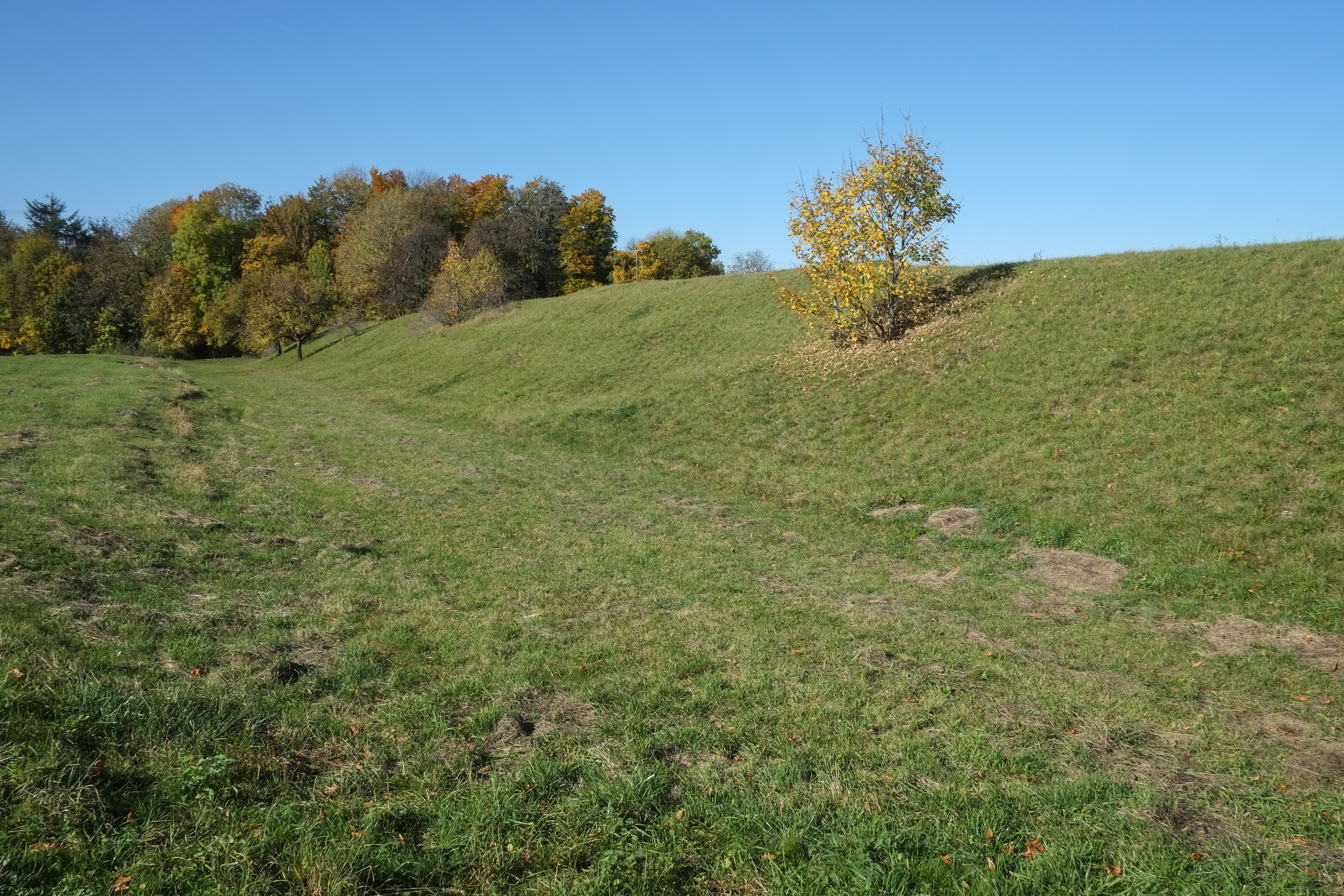
Rampart remains
