= Hülben =

- Municipality
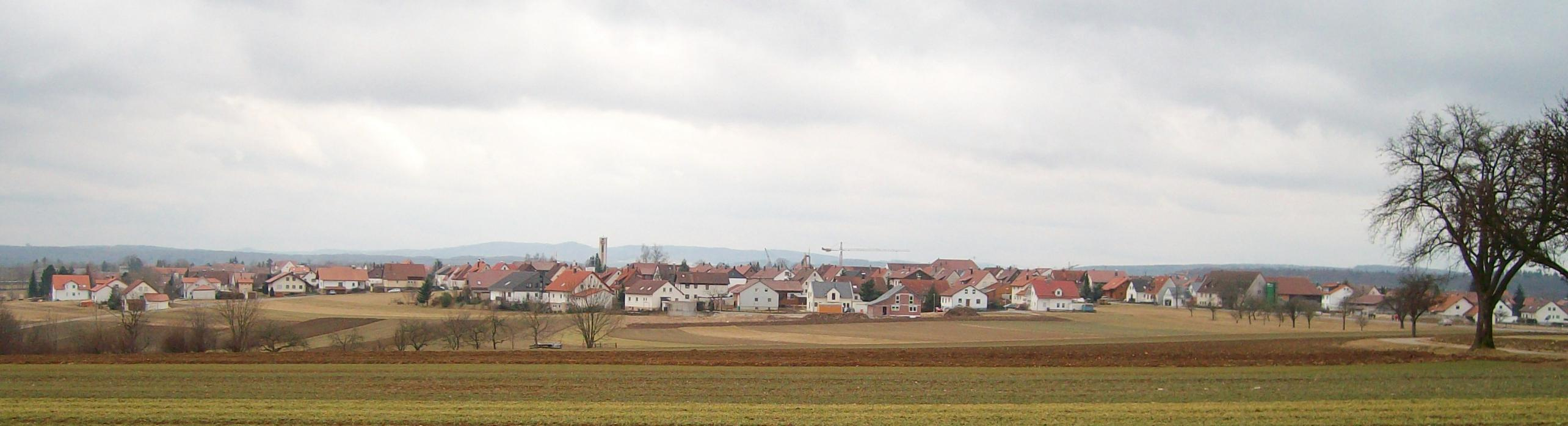

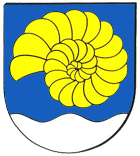
- Coat of arms

- Location of Hülben within Reutlingen district
- Interactive map of Hülben
- Location within Germany Location within Baden-Württemberg
- Coordinates: 48°31′06″N 09°24′20″E
- Country: Germany
- State: Baden-Württemberg
- Admin. region: Tübingen
- District: Reutlingen

Government
  - Mayor (2022–30): Siegmund Ganser

Area
  - Total: 6.41 km^{2} (2.47 sq mi)
- Elevation: 713 m (2,339 ft)

Population (2025-12-31)
  - Total: 3,174
  - Density: 495/km^{2} (1,280/sq mi)
- Time zone: UTC+01:00 (CET)
  - Summer (DST): UTC+02:00 (CEST)
- Postal codes: 72584
- Dialling codes: 07125
- Vehicle registration: RT
- Website: www.huelben.de

Hülben (German pronunciation: [ˈhʏlbn̩]) is a municipality in the district of Reutlingen in Baden-Württemberg in Germany.

It is located next to the area of the Celtic Heidengraben.

== Geography ==
Hülben is a municipality on the northern edge of the Swabian Jura, above the spa town of Bad Urach.

=== Neighbouring communities ===
The following cities and municipalities are bordering the municipality Hülben, they are (starting from the north) called the clockwise and belong to Reutlingen district or to Esslingen district ^{1}

Neuffen ^{1}, Erkenbrechtsweiler ^{1}, Grabenstetten, Bad Urach and Dettingen an der Erms.

=== Constituent communities ===
The municipality Hülben includes the village Hülben and a group of houses.

== History ==
=== Establishing and territorial affiliation ===
Hülben was probably founded in the time of the Alemannic conquest between 700 and 800. The village name is a dwelling place name by the two Hülben , where at that time had settled the first settlers. 1137 Hülben is first mentioned in the Zwiefalter chronicles. 1265 came Hülben as part of the House of Urach to Württemberg, and became Protestant 1534 after the Battle of Lauffen.

Only in 1866 Hülben had his own parish.

=== Pietism ===
Nationally the community became known by the derived from Michael Cullin (* 1540) family of teachers named Kullen. From 1722 to 1966 (until 1939 without interruption) members of the family Kullen worked in the school service of Hülben. From the family Kullen came also the old pietism community, which holds the "fair Monday hour" till today.

== Population ==
The population figures are census results (^{1}) or official updates of the State Statistical Office (only principal residences).

Date	Number of inhabitants
1. December 1871 ^{1}	957
1. December 1900 ^{1}	1.330
17. May 1939 ^{1}	1.921
13. September 1950 ^{1}	2.209
6. June 1961 ^{1}	2.545
27. May 1970 ^{1}	2.676
25. May 1987 ^{1}	2.610
31. December 1995	2.893
31. December 2000	2.936
31. December 2005	2.885
31. December 2010	2.826

== Coat of arms ==
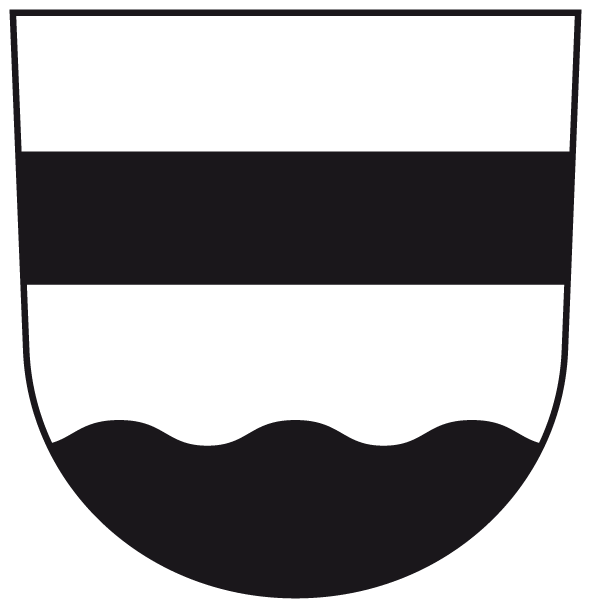

== Politics ==
=== Council ===
The council Hülben has 12 members. The local elections in Baden-Württemberg 2014 were made in Hülben according to the majority vote, this means that only one list was drawn up. The council consists of the elected honorary councilors and the mayor as chairman. The mayor is entitled to vote in the municipal council.

=== Mayor ===
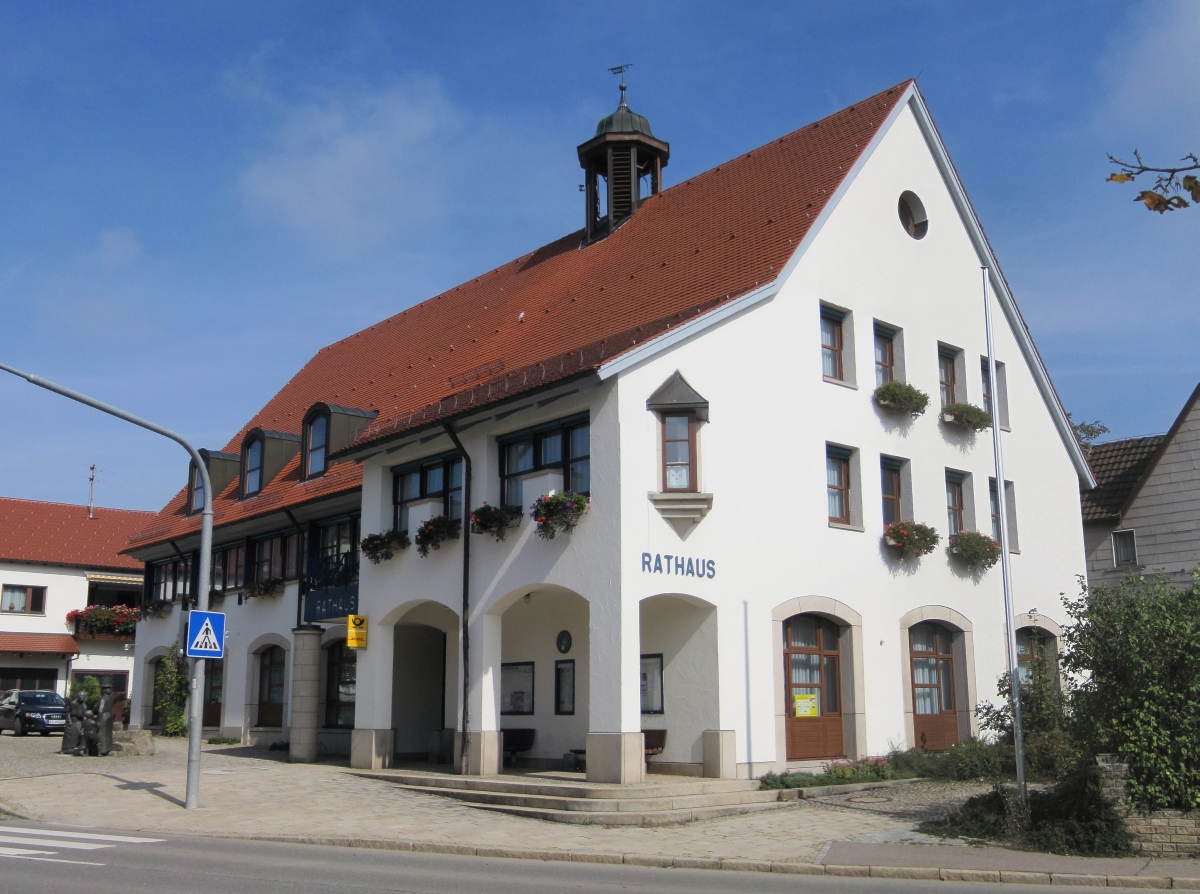
Hülben Town hall 2013

- 1922-1951: Ernst Schaude
- 1952-1982: Fritz Herter
- 1982-2006: Hans Notter
- Since 2006: Siegmund Ganser

== Arms ==
Blazon: "In blue over a silver Wellenschildfuß a golden ammonite."

=== Old coat of arms ===
The old coat of arms was awarded on 26 April 1951 by Ministry of the Interior Württemberg-Hohenzollern.

Blazon: "In silver over a black Wellenschildfuß a black bar."

After a council resolution of 12 March 1948, the emblem of the already then no longer predominantly agricultural municipality should include other figures. The Wellenschildfuß refers to the municipality of origin, which is derived from "hülwe" = pool or lake. The bar is reminiscent of the Knights of Dettingen who had possessions in Hülben. The family of Cudi miles de Tettingen led this crest figure.

== Natural Monuments ==
The Hülben stalactite cave was discovered during the construction of national road Bad Urach-Hülben on September 19, 1978, it is a stalactite cave with stalactites and stalagmites. An about 5 m deep shaft leads into the easily accessible part of the cave. This has about room size, but with only partial low altitude.

== Regular events ==
- Hüle-Hock, end August
- Kirchweih Monday hour on Monday after the 3rd Sunday of October
- Feuerwehr Hock, in mid-June
- May Hock, May 1

== Arts ==
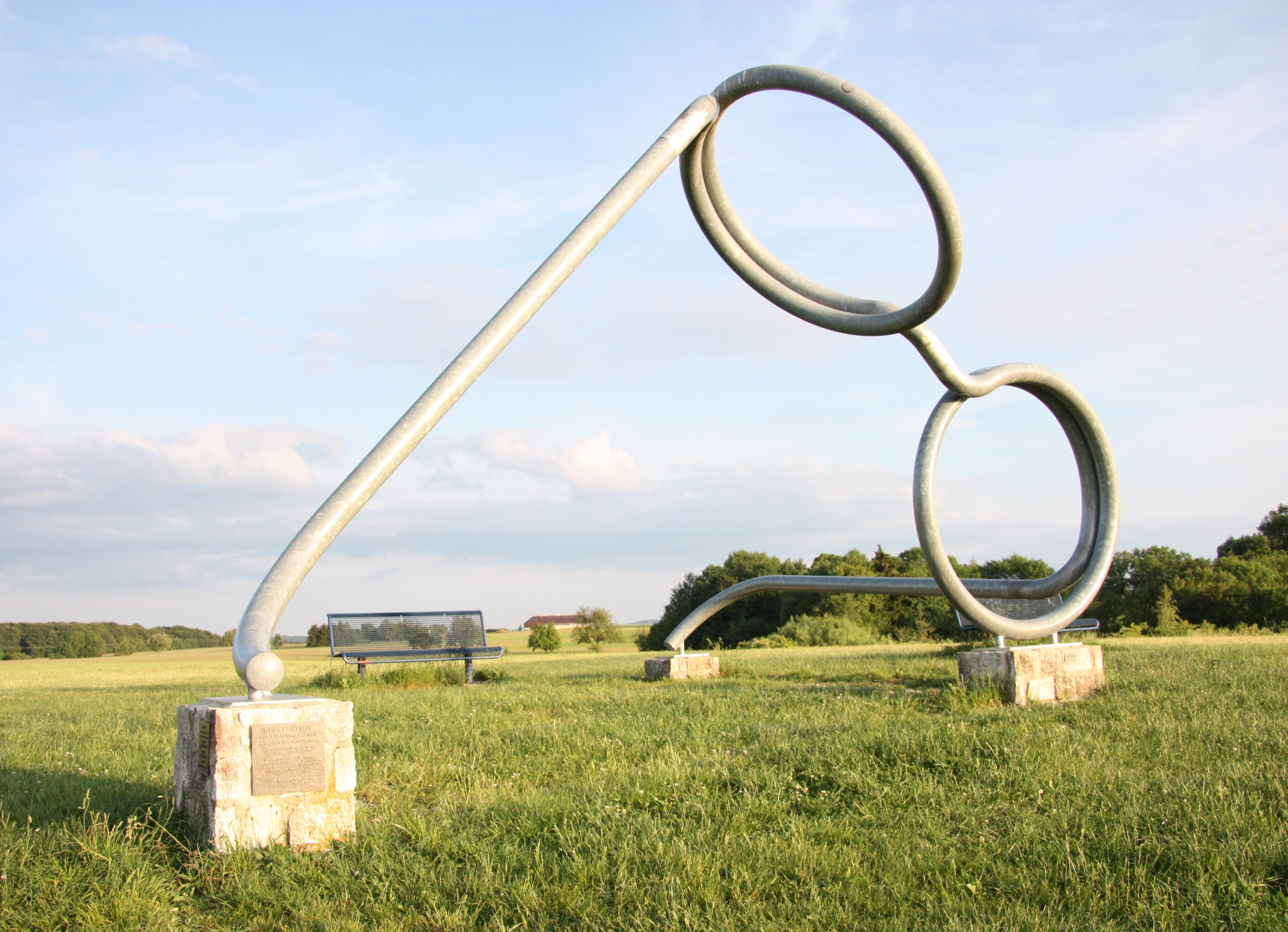

Modern art (glasses) outside Hülben

== Economy and infrastructure ==
=== Traffic ===
The National Road 250 connects the municipality to the south with Bad Urach. The state road 1250 connects Hülben to the north with Neuffen.

The Public transport is guaranteed by the Verkehrsverbund Neckar-Alb-Donau (NALDO). The community is located in the comb 221.

== Personality ==
=== Sons and daughters of the town ===
- Hans Schwenkel (1886-1957), Württemberg State Curator of Nature Conservation during Nazi era
- Gotthilf Kächele (1888-1969), baker champion and politician
- Eberhard Kullen (1911-2007), Federal Railroad official, head of old pietism community Hülben

=== Personalities who have worked at the site ===
- Ernst Schaude (1916-2001), jurist, Government Vice-President of the Regierungspräsidium Stuttgart, grew up in Hülben
- Markus Pleuler (born 1970), football player, comes from Hülben

=== Famous pastors ===
- Johann Ludwig Fricker (1729-1766), pastor in Hülben
- Wilhelm Zimmermann (1807-1878), pastor in Hülben, professor of German literature and history, a deputy in the Frankfurt National Assembly, Member of Parliament

=== In Hülben active painters ===
- Karl Wilhelm Bauerle (1831-1912), a painter at the court of Queen Victoria

== Literature ==
- Hülben. Hrsg.: Gemeinde Hülben. Neuffen, Hülben [1995]. – Mit Abbildungen
- Hülben. Ein Gang durch die Geschichte. Herausgeber: Gemeinde Hülben. Redaktion: Kreisarchivarin Irmtraud Betz. Hülben 1987. – Mit Abbildungen

Pietismus

- Dr. Wilhelm Busch: Aus einem schwäbischen Dorfschulhause (Familie Kullen). 2. Aufl. Elberfeld 1906
- Friedrich Baun: Die Familie Kullen. Zweihundert Jahre im Dienst der Schule zu Hülben (1722–1922). Stuttgart 1922
- Julius Roessle [Rößle]: Von Bengel bis Blumhardt. Gestalten und Bilder aus der Geschichte des schwäbischen Pietismus. 4. Auflage. Metzingen/Württ. 1966, Seite 324–332: "Hülben und die Familie Kullen"
- Gelebter Glaube. Erfahrungen und Lebenszeugnisse aus unserem Land. Ein Lesebuch. Herausgegeben von Werner Raupp. Metzingen/Württemberg 1991, S. 179–188: "Familie Kullen"
- Rolf Scheffbuch: Das Kullen-Schulhaus in Hülben. Hrsg. [und Verleger]: Siegfried Kullen, Hülben, [Hauptstr. 18], 2011, ISBN 978-3-00-036752-6. [Erschienen anlässlich des 200-Jahr-Jubiläums der Erbauung.]
