= Neuffen =

- Town
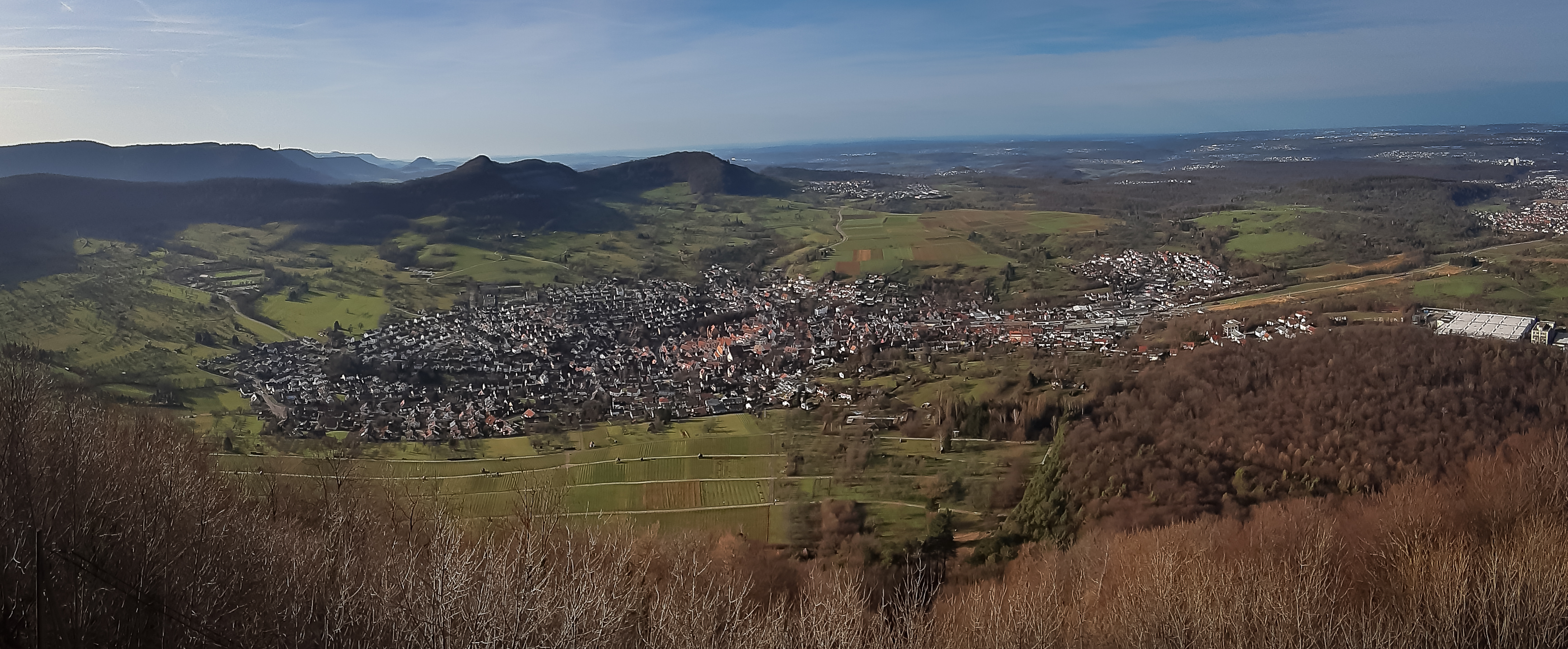

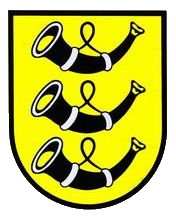
- Coat of arms

- Location of Neuffen within Esslingen district
- Interactive map of Neuffen
- Location within Germany Location within Baden-Württemberg
- Coordinates: 48°33′16″N 9°22′32″E
- Country: Germany
- State: Baden-Württemberg
- Admin. region: Stuttgart
- District: Esslingen

Government
  - Mayor (2018–26): Matthias Bäcker

Area
  - Total: 17.43 km^{2} (6.73 sq mi)
- Elevation: 408 m (1,339 ft)

Population (2025-12-31)
  - Total: 6,176
  - Density: 354.3/km^{2} (917.7/sq mi)
- Time zone: UTC+01:00 (CET)
  - Summer (DST): UTC+02:00 (CEST)
- Postal codes: 72637–72639
- Dialling codes: 07025; 07123 (Kappishäusern)
- Vehicle registration: ES
- Website: www.neuffen.de

Neuffen (German pronunciation: [ˈnɔʏfn̩]) is a town in the district of Esslingen, in Baden-Württemberg in southern Germany.

== Geography ==
It is located 14 km northeast of Reutlingen, and 28 km southeast of Stuttgart.

Its major attraction is a quite impressive castle with strong walls, the Hohenneuffen, which lies high above the town at the ridge of the Swabian Jura. Neuffen is located on the northern edge of the Swabian Jura, the so-called Albtrauf. Neuffen town is 407 meters, the castle ruin Hohenneuffen 743 m above sea level.

== Neighboring communities ==
The town Neuffen borders in the north to the community of Frickenhausen (denunciations Linsenhofen and Tischardt), in the northeast to Beuren, on the east to Erkenbrechtsweiler, on the south to Hülben and Dettingen an der Erms, on the west to the cities of Metzingen and Kohlberg .

== Constituent ==
Neuffen consists of the districts Kappishäusern and Neuffen. To the district Kappishäusern belongs the village Kappishäusern. Neuffen includes the town of Neuffen, the courts Jushof and Pfingstbuckel and the houses Hart and the Hardt. In the urban area are the dialed villages Bodelsberg, Winden and Hofstetten, but that may be the same as the two courts Bodelsberg and Winden.

== History ==
The first Celtic settlement began around 100 b. Chr. Around 1100 the castle Hohenneuffen was originated.

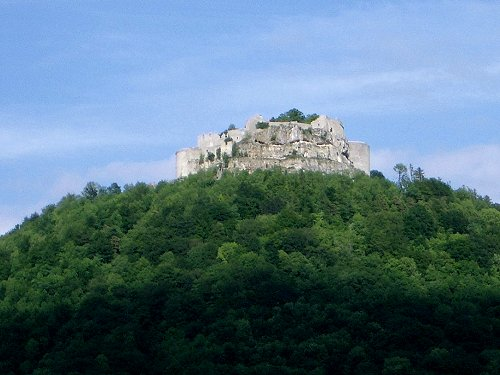
Hohenneuffen

Due to the good contacts to the Lords of Nifen, Neuffen already received town privileges in 1232. 1303 Liutgard of Nifen sold Neuffen to Württemberg. From the 14th century until 1806 Neuffen was the seat of an office. From 1543 on the expansion of the castle Hohenneuffen to a land fortress was carried out. A fire in 1634 almost completely destroyed Neuffen. From 1801 on, the castle was partially canceled. The office Neuffen was assigned in 1806 to the newly formed Oberamt Nürtingen. In 1900 the Tälesbahn connected Neuffen to the railway network. In 1938 Neuffen came to the newly formed district of Nürtingen. In 1973 Neuffen came to the district of Esslingen. In August 1948 the Prime Minister of Württemberg-Baden Reinhold Maier, the Prime Minister of Südbaden Leo Wohleb and the Interior Minister of South Württemberg-Hohenzollern Viktor Renner talked at Hohenneuffen about establishing a new Southwest State, today Baden-Württemberg.

== Incorporations ==
July 1, 1972: Kappishäusern

== Religion ==
The Evangelical church members meet in the Gothic church of St. Martin. There is also an Evangelical Free Church. In the Lichtensteinstraße is the Catholic Church.

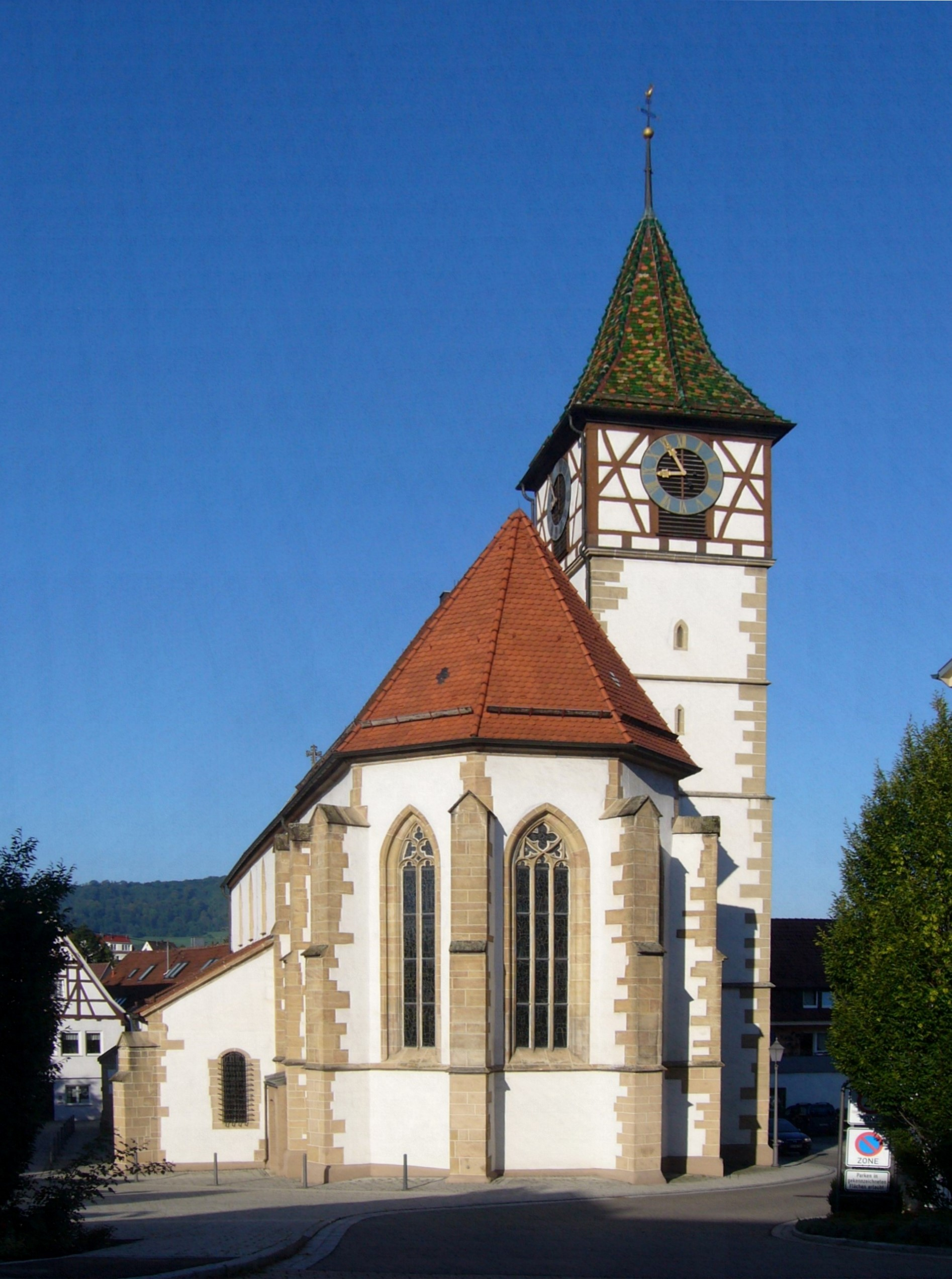
Martinskirche Neuffen from the east side

== Economics and Infrastructure ==
The initial focus was on agriculture (farming, viticulture, fruit trees, small livestock), then the weavers, later the textile industry; today the metal industry dominates. On the slopes below the ruins Hohenneuffen is one of the highest vineyards in Germany.

=== Transportation ===
The Tälesbahn to Nürtingen connects Neuffen with the national rail network. The L 1250 combines Neuffen with Linsenhofen and Hülben. On Sundays and public holidays during the summer months, a heritage railway is in operation, run by the Railway Vehicle Preservation Company.

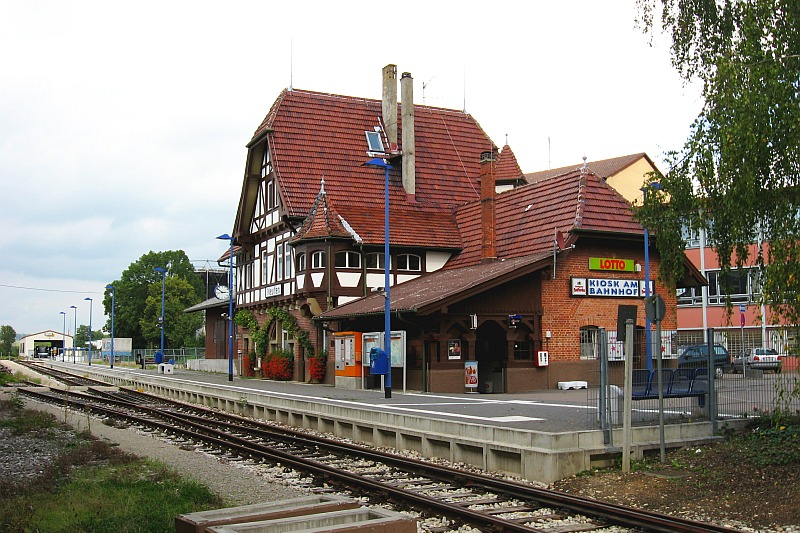
Neuffen station

=== Water Supply ===
Neuffen obtains the drinking water from the Zweckverband Landeswasserversorgung and from own sources. The district of Kappishäusern is supplied with drinking water from the water supply association Jusigruppe.

=== Waste ===
Responsible for waste disposal is the district Esslingen.

=== Educational institutions ===
Neuffen has not only a primary school and a Werkrealschule, but also a secondary school and a housed in elementary school special school.

== Leisure and sports facilities ==
The offer includes the sports area Spadelsberg, the outdoor pool, the sports' hall and the sports' hall of the Gymnastics Federation Neuffen. In addition, the Gymnastics Federation operates a ski lift. Neuffen is located directly below the Swabian Jura North Rim-path HW1 (long distance footpath).

== Points of interest ==
Ruins Hohenneuffen The Hohenneuffen is, the second largest fortress ruin in Baden-Württemberg. It offers a beautiful view on Neuffen and the surroundings, especially at the time of the cherry blossom. Neuffen is located at the Württemberg wine road, which passes many sights.

== Museums ==
In addition to the City Museum at the Big House there is also a religious museum.

== Buildings ==
- Ruins Hohenneuffen
- Martin church with olives of 1504
- Schilling'sches big house
- Melchior hunter house
- Town hall
- City wall (only partially preserved)
- Neuffen station

== Personality ==
=== Freeman ===
Since 1986, the former mayor Kurt Schmid is an honorary citizen of Neuffen.

=== Sons and daughters of the city ===
- Robert Reinhardt (1843–1914), architect and university lecturer
- Wilhelm Steinhilber (1892–1977), local historian
- Jörg Biel (1943–2015), prehistoric archaeologist, by 2008 public curator

=== Individuals who have lived or worked in Neuffen ===
- Gottfried von Neifen (13th century)
- Friedrich Wilhelm Fischer (1779–1836), Official in Neuffen, member of parliament
- Leopold Marx, the well-known entrepreneur, poet and writer, lived in Neuffen in the 1930s besides the family of Julius Marx. The weaving company of the Marx family was aryanizised in 1938.
- Wilhelm Karl King (born 1935), dialect poet, he grew up in Kappishäusern district.
- Jörg Anvil (born 1942), politician (CDU), Member of Parliament (1992–2011), lived in Neuffen.
- Thomas Brdarić (born 1975), football player, Germany national team, grew up in Neuffen.
