= Luisa Richter =

German-born Venezuelan artist (1928–2015)

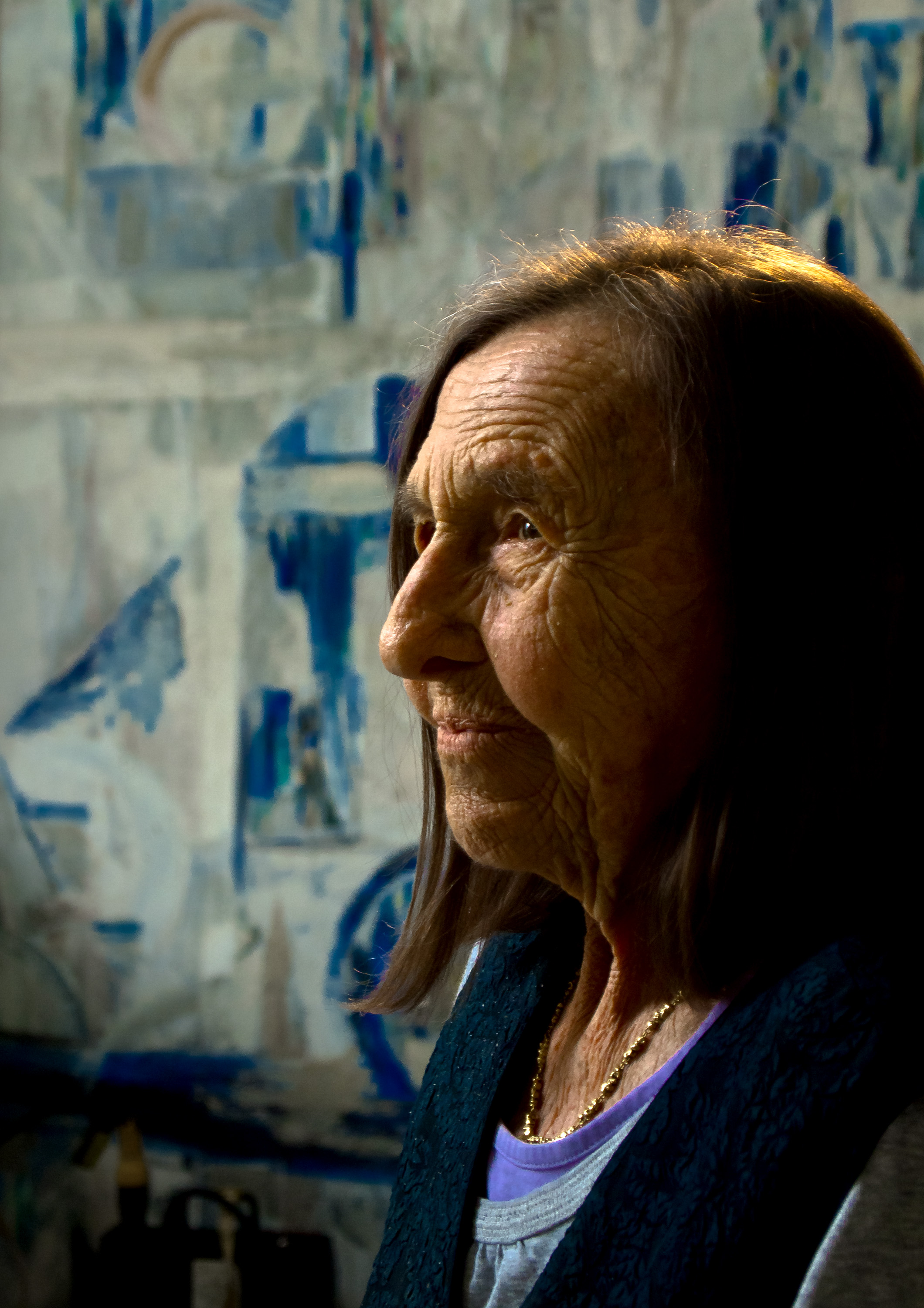
Luisa Richter

Luisa Richter (30 June 1928 – 29 October 2015), born Louise Kaelble, was a German-born Venezuelan painter, printmaker, collage artist, and educator based in Caracas. Trained in Stuttgart under Willi Baumeister (1949–1955), she relocated to Caracas in 1955 and developed an abstract practice that included informalist painting, geometric “planar spaces”, and an extensive body of collage work. She participated in the Solomon R. Guggenheim Museum’s 1966 exhibition The Emergent Decade: Latin American Painters and Painting in the 1960's and represented Venezuela at the 38th Venice Biennale in 1978, where she exhibited twelve oil paintings and thirty collages. In Venezuela, she received the National Prize of Drawing and Engraving (1967) and the National Prize of Plastic Arts (1981). In 2002 she received the Knight's Cross of the Order of Merit of the Federal Republic of Germany, and in 2008 her hometown of Besigheim established the Luisa Richter Prize for visual arts.

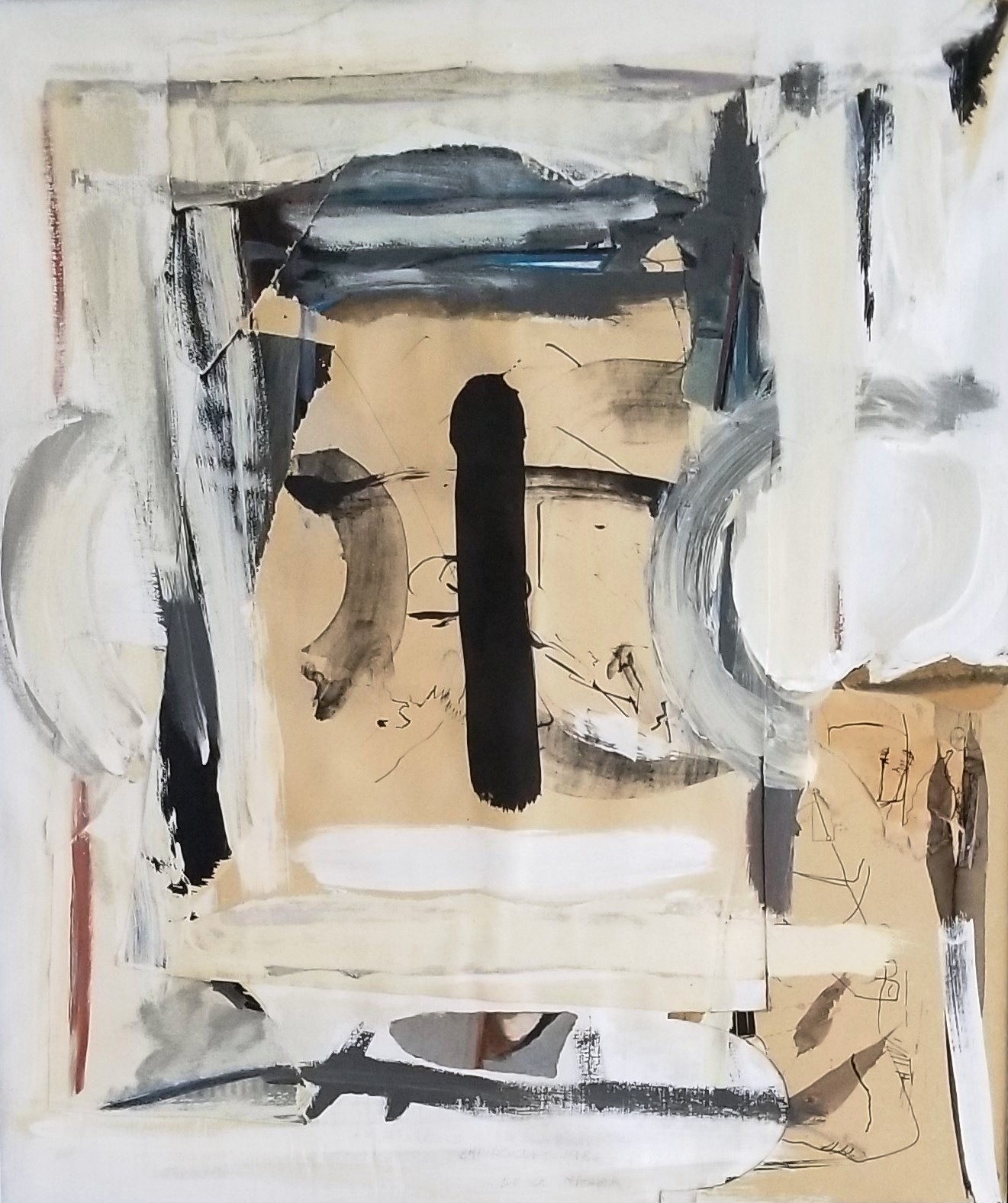
"Empedocles." A mixed technique constructivism artwork dated 1989 by Luisa Richter. Private collection.

== Early life and education ==
Richter was born in Besigheim, Germany. El Estímulo identifies her parents as Albert Kaelble (an engineer and architect) and Gertrud Unkel. She studied art in Stuttgart and worked under Willi Baumeister at the Academy of Fine Arts in Stuttgart from 1949 to 1955. According to the Landesarchiv Baden-Württemberg biographical record, she lived in Caracas from 1955.

== Career ==
Richter settled in Venezuela in the mid-1950s and entered the country’s main art circuits soon after her arrival. The Museo Nacional de Artes Visuales biography notes that she held her first solo exhibition at the Museo de Bellas Artes (Caracas) in 1959.

The same source associates her early Caracas painting with informalism and highlights her series Cortes de Tierra, inspired by earth cuts seen in the mountains during her first ascent to Caracas from La Guaira. It also notes that in the 1960s she began expressive drawings titled Cruces y conexiones and that she temporarily returned to figuration in 1963.

In 1966 she participated in the Guggenheim Museum exhibition The Emergent Decade: Latin American Painters and Painting in the 1960's. In 1978 she represented Venezuela at the 38th Venice Biennale; the MNAV biography states that her presentation included twelve oil paintings and thirty collages, while Kunstmuseum Stuttgart describes her “planar spaces” as the basis of her international breakthrough and notes her ongoing focus on collage.

== Work and style ==
Museum and critical writing on Richter commonly emphasizes her movement between textured abstraction in her early Venezuelan work and later geometric and spatial concerns (“planar spaces”), alongside a sustained commitment to collage as an independent line of work. Kunstmuseum Stuttgart notes that during her stays in Besigheim she produced expressive figurative paintings “in the tradition of Willi Baumeister and Hans Fähnle”. A 1993 essay by critic Ricardo Pau-Llosa (described in the ICAA/MFAH record) analyzes how Richter sought to recover “the essential” in abstract visual languages, including the transformation of informalist concerns (light and texture) into a different conceptual register.

== Teaching and design work ==
Richter taught at the Instituto de Diseño Neumann in Caracas; El Estímulo describes her as teaching there for 18 years, and El Nacional identifies her as a faculty member and founder of Prodiseño. El Nacional also reports that she received an honorary doctorate (Doctorado Honoris Causa) from the Simón Bolívar University in 2010 in recognition of her artistic career.

== Awards and honours ==
The Museo Nacional de Artes Visuales biography lists Richter as receiving Venezuela’s National Prize of Drawing and Engraving (1967) and National Prize of Plastic Arts (1981). La Vanguardia reports that she received the Knight's Cross of the Order of Merit of the Federal Republic of Germany in 2002 and that the Luisa Richter Prize for visual arts was established in Besigheim in 2008.
