= Hohenneuffen Castle =

Coordinates: 48°33′20″N 9°23′33″E

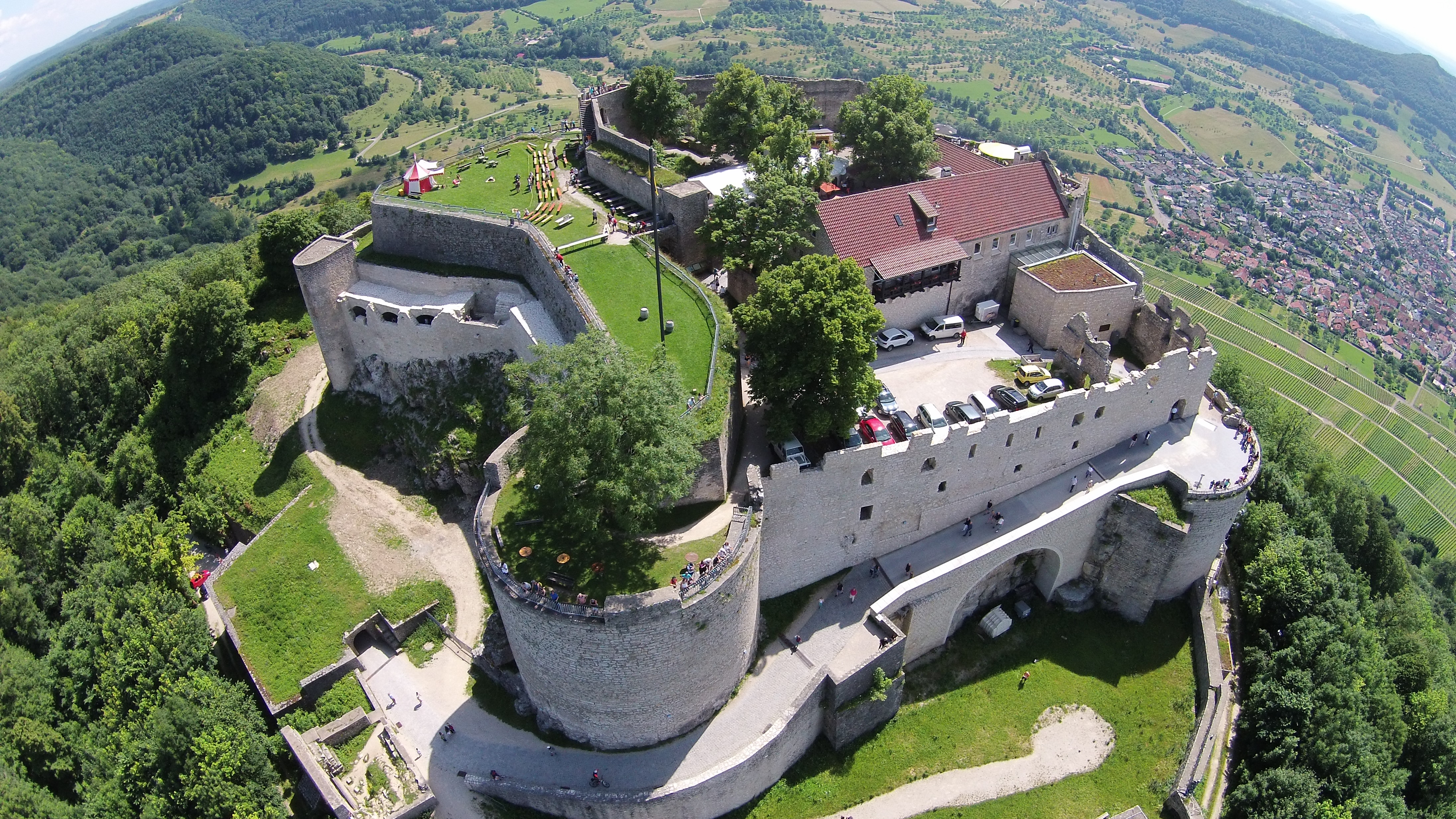
Aerial view of Hohenneuffen Castle in 2015

Hohenneuffen Castle is a large ruined castle in the northern foothills of the Swabian Alb, above the town of Neuffen in the district of Esslingen in Baden-Württemberg.

== Location ==
The medieval castle is situated on a large late Jurassic rock on the edge of the Swabian Alb at an elevation of 743 m (2437 ft) in a strategically advantageous location on the slopes of the mountain range.

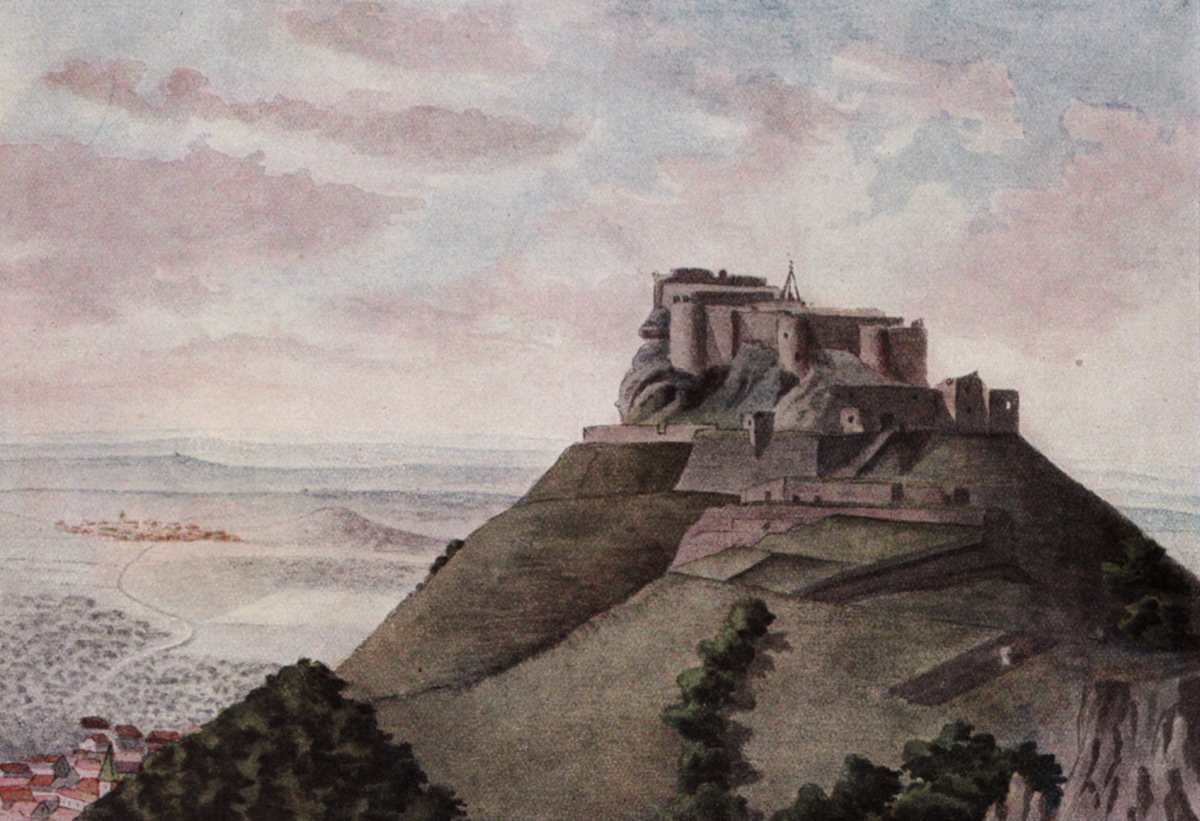
Hohenneuffen Castle in 1822

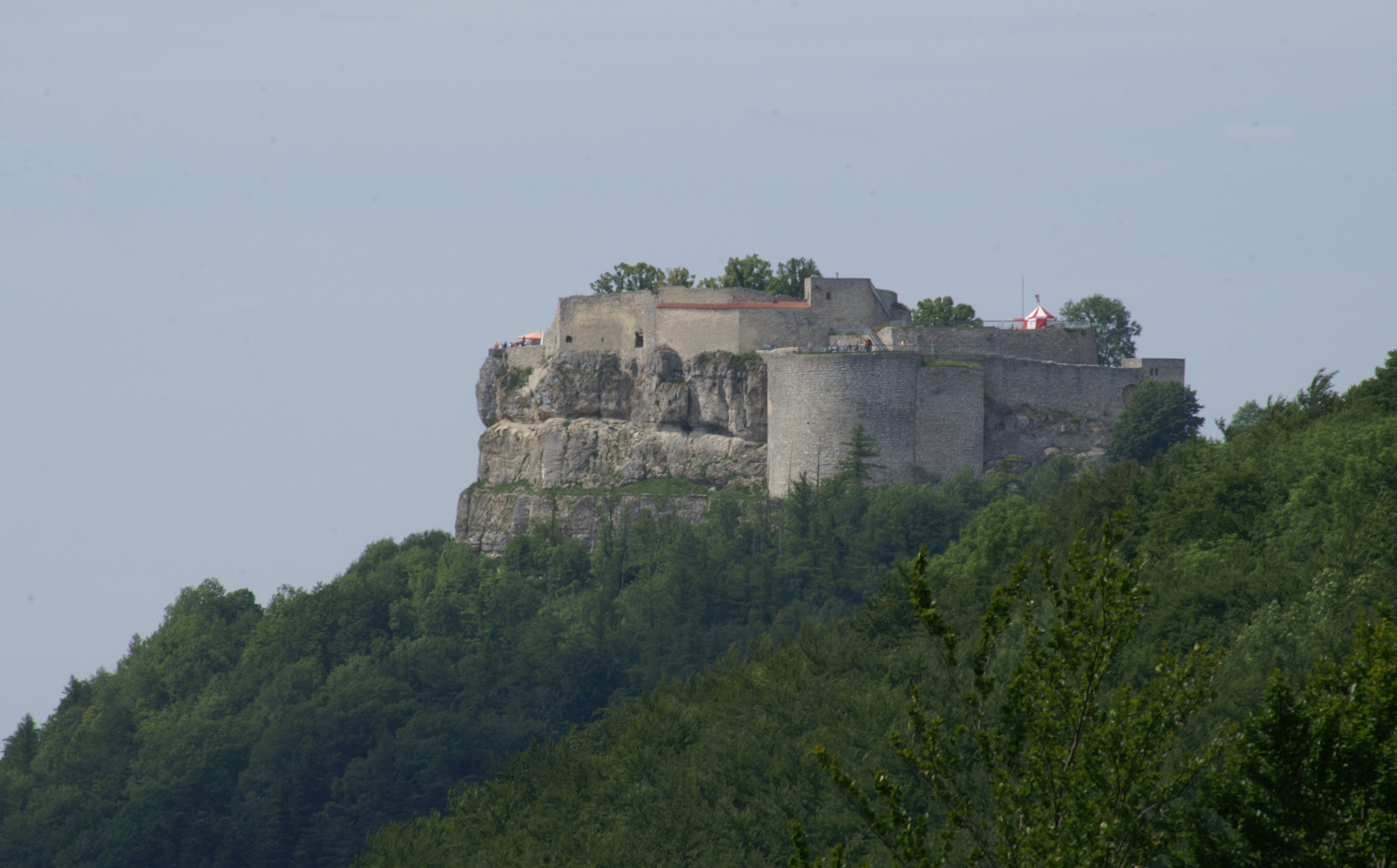
Hohenneuffen Castle

== History ==
There is evidence for a pre-historic, Iron Age settlement on Hohenneuffen. It functioned as an outpost for the oppidum at Heidengraben during the late La Tène period in the first century BCE.

The pre-Germanic name Neuffen is derived from the proto-Celtic adjective nobos, meaning holy or sacred, implying that the mountain had a religious rather than a military function 2000 years ago.

The castle was built between 1100 and 1120 by Mangold von Sulmetingen who later changed his name to include the element von Neuffen. The first documentary evidence dates from 1198. At that time the castle was still in possession of the family von Neuffen, a member of which was the Minnesänger Gottfried von Neifen. The castle went into the possession of the Lords of Weinsberg at the end of the 13th century who sold it on to the Counts of Württemberg in 1301. The castle proved its defensive worth in 1312 when, during the Reichskrieg, an internal conflict within the Holy Roman Empire following the election of Henry VII as Holy Roman Emperor, it could not be conquered.

The expansion of Hohenneuffen Castle into a fortress began in the 14th century. However, the most important alterations to the castle structure were conducted by Duke Ulrich of Württemberg in the first half of the 16th century. Barbicans, round towers, bastions, a building for the commanding officer, casemates, stables, an armoury as well as two cisterns were built. Essentially, these fortification did not change for the next two hundred years. While the fortress had to surrender to troops from the Swabian League in 1519, it withstood the insurgent peasants' attempt to take it during the German Peasants' War of 1524/25.

The castle was besieged by Imperial forces for more than a year during the Thirty Years' War. In November 1635 the commanding officer Johann Philipp Schnurm and his dispirited troops managed to negotiate a surrender, allowing Schnurm and his men to depart with their weapons and possessions. Yet, in violation of the agreed terms the troops were forced to serve in the Imperial army and Schnurm lost all his possessions.

Duke Karl Alexander of Württemberg planned to have Hohenneuffen altered into a fortress following the French model. Yet he died before the task was completed and his successor, Karl Eugen abandoned the plan due to the high costs and the doubtful military benefit. In 1793 it was decided to raze the castle and to sell off the building materials. The castle went out of use in 1795 and was finally destined for destruction in 1801. The inhabitants of the surrounding area were happy to utilise the cheap building materials. Only from 1830 onwards the remains of the castle were safeguarded from further destruction and in the 1860s public access to the ruin was allowed. In 1862 an inn was established in one of the buildings in the upper bailey.

Similar to other fortresses Hohenneuffen was used as a holding place for prisoners of the state, where important prisoners were held and, if deemed necessary, tortured. Amongst those were a young Count of Helfenstein who fell to his death in 1502 whilst trying to escape from the castle. In 1512 Duke Ulrich had the abbot of Zwiefalten Abbey, Georg Fischer, imprisoned at the castle. On the orders of Duke Ulrich the reeve of Tübingen, Konrad Breuning, was held and tortured here before being beheaded in 1517 in Stuttgart. Matthäus Enzlin, Geheimrat at the court of Duke Johann Frederick of Württemberg, attempted several escapes whilst being imprisoned on Hohenneuffen in the early 16th century. In 1737 Joseph Süß Oppenheimer, Court Jew to Duke Karl Alexander was incarcerated on Hohenneuffen for several weeks before being relocated to Hohenasperg, finally to be executed in Stuttgart in 1738.

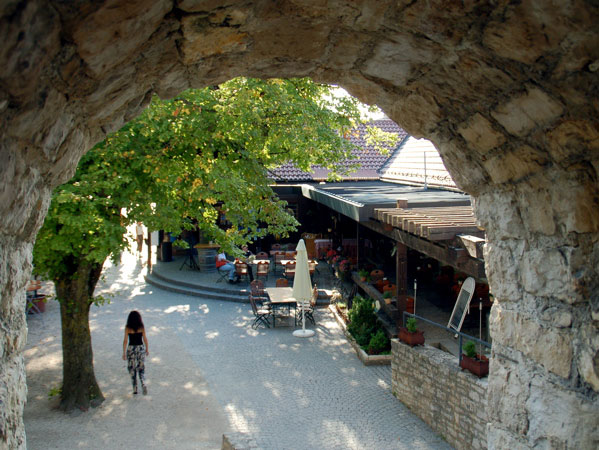
Hohenneuffen Castle, inner courtyard

== The Three-States-Conference ==
During the Allied occupation of Germany following the end of World War II, the military governments of the American and French occupation zones founded three states in their zones in 1946 and 1947: Württemberg-Baden in the American zone, Württemberg-Hohenzollern and Baden in the French occupation zone. When it became known that a constitution was being worked out for West Germany, a number of politicians took the initiative to merge the three south-western states. The prime minister of Württemberg-Baden, Reinhold Maier, invited the governments of the three states to a conference which took place on 2 August 1948 at Hohenneuffen Castle. His idea was to bring the governments closer together in order to prepare for the formation of a new state in the southwest of Germany. The delegation from Baden was headed by Leo Wohleb, an uncompromising advocate of the restoration of the former Baden. Württemberg-Hohenzollern was represented by its home secretary, Viktor Renner. Maier had chosen the place for the conference with care. The wide view from the top of the mountain, particularly onto the border of the occupation zones which ran between the district of Reutlingen and the then district of Nürtingen, was meant to impress the delegates. Secluded from their respective governmental apparatus and the public, the participants were supposed to be able to engage in discussions without any disturbances. However, no agreement was reached at the end of the conference. Nevertheless, it marked the beginning of the process which led to the formation of the so-called Southwest State in 1952: Baden-Württemberg.

== Current use ==
Today, access to Hohenneuffen Castle is free for the public and some of the casemates are accessible. There is also a restaurant, beer garden and a kiosk.

A fell running event (Hohenneuffen-Berglauf) takes place every June. Participants have to cover a distance of 9.3 km and a difference in altitude of 483 metres.

Furthermore, the castle is also used for concerts and a medieval-style market.

== See also ==
- List of castles in Baden-Württemberg
