= Friedrich Schrempf =

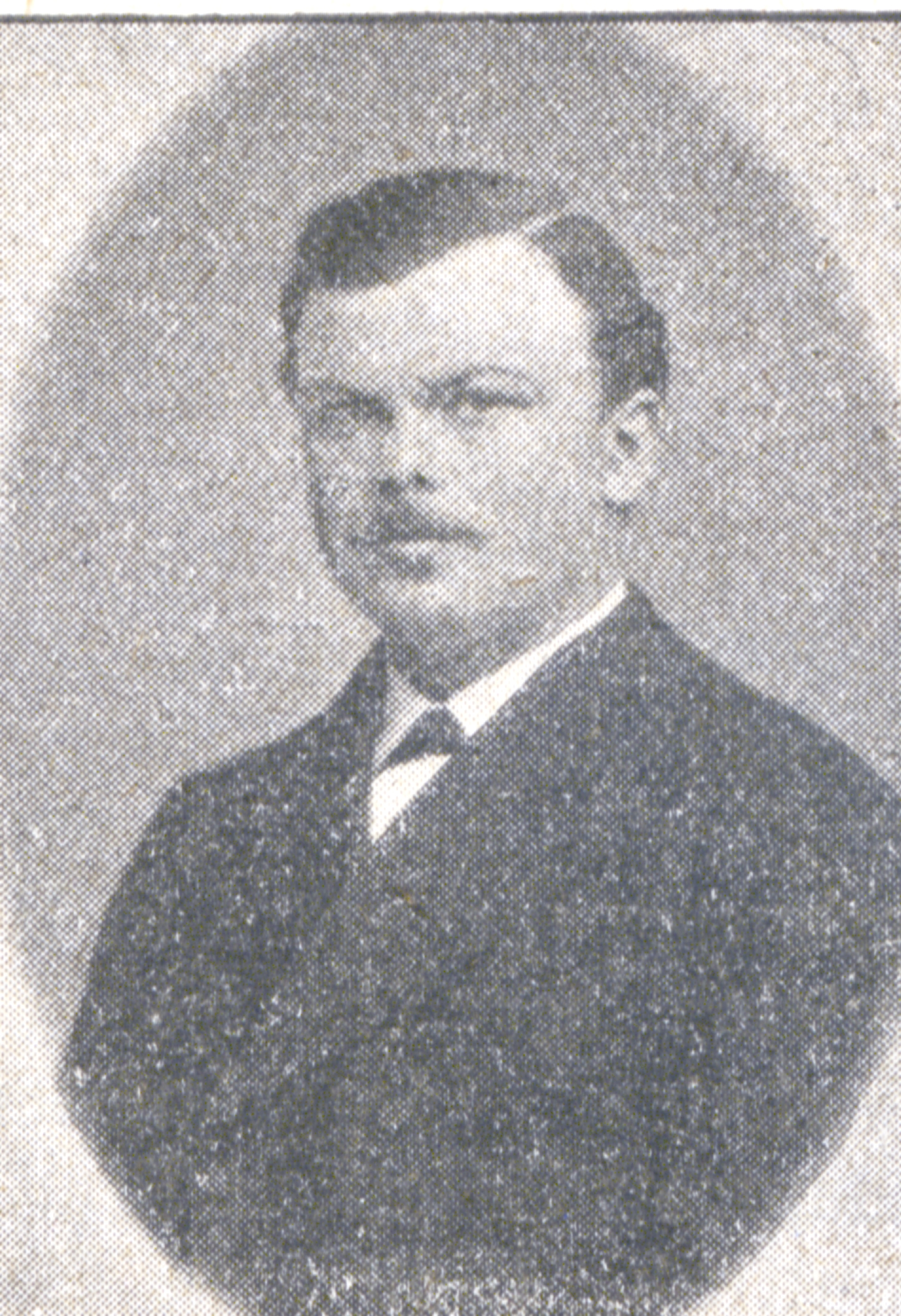
Friedrich Christian Schrempf

Friedrich Christian Schrempf (24 February 1858 – 8 January 1913) was an editor and a member of the German Reichstag.

== Life ==
Schrempf was born in Besigheim and was raised by his mother's brother. He attended schools in Ingersheim, Boll and Horrheim. After the aspirant exam in March 1871, he was a student at the private seminar Tempelhof in Oberamt Crailsheim from 1872 to 1875, and then was a seminary teacher there until 1879. After that he was a teacher at the boys' school of Professor Pfleiderer and in the community grammar school in Korntal until 1890. Subsequently, he was a contributing editor of the conservative daily Deutsche Reichspost in Stuttgart, and from spring 1892 to 1909 lead editor. From 1890 he was also secretary of the conservative Württemberg Party. On 1 December 1912, Schrempf retired. He died in Stuttgart.

== Politics ==
Between 1895 and 1900, Schrempf was a member of the Estates of Württemberg for the Schorndorf constituency and from 1906 to 1912 for the Öhringen constituency.

From 1898 to 1903, Schrempf was a member of the German Reichstag for the electoral district of Württemberg 7 (Nagold, Calw, Neuenbürg, Herrenberg). He was nominated as a compromise candidate of the National Liberal Party, the Conservatives and the German Agrarian League. In the Reichstag, he belonged to the faction of the German Conservative Party.
