= Christoph Schrempf =

German theologian and philosopher

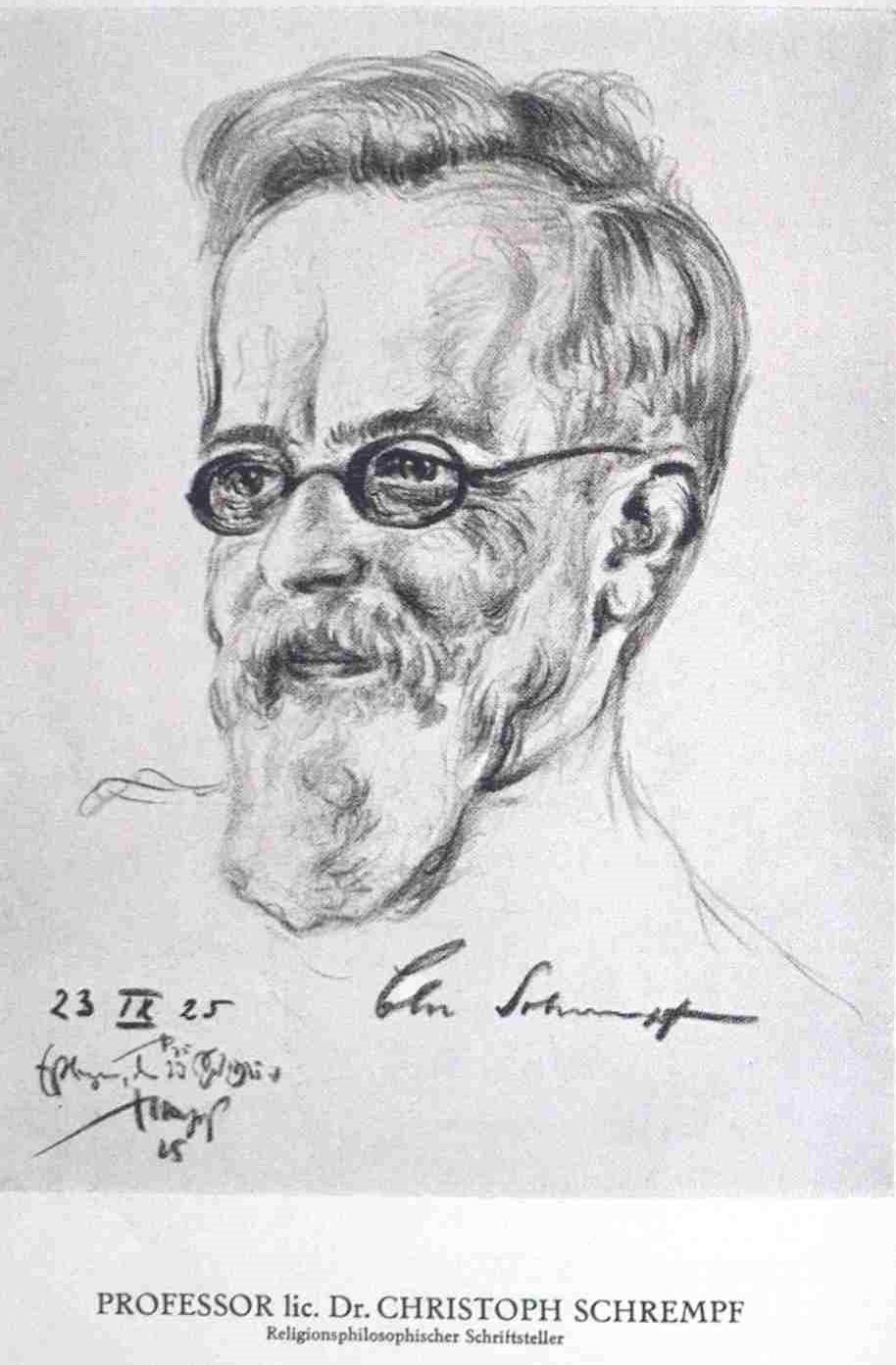
Christoph Schrempf

Christoph Schrempf (April 28, 1860 – February 13, 1944) was a German evangelical theologian and philosopher.

== Life ==
Christoph Schrempf was a pastor and writer from Besigheim, Germany. He had a difficult childhood due to his father's alcoholism. His mother suffered from the violence until she fled, taking the children. Perhaps this made the young Christoph Schrempf sensitive to all forms of violence, including hidden violence. In his youth, Schrempf was an avid Bible reader. He studied religion and was vicar and assistant teacher in Tübingen. The normal path of a Protestant Württemberg Pastor seemed predetermined. He read the Bible with a critical scientific eye and explored the historical background of biblical texts. The question of truth and the correct understanding of scripture and confession kept him very busy. Schrempf became a pastor in the small village Leuzendorf in Hohenlohe, in the deanery Blaufelden. He tried to be a good pastor. But in 1892, he fell into a severe crisis of faith. When preparing for a baptismal sermon doubts surfaced. During the service, he refused the prescribed creed of Baptism. No one really noticed but he later shared his doubts and reasons with his congregation during church service. The churchgoers were shocked and outraged. The church council demanded his dismissal. In 1892 he was dismissed from the parish, because of "misconduct against the accepted official business".

The dismissal was a trauma for Schrempf as he believed that his sincerity should be respected. Twenty years later the omission of creed of pastoral reasons in exceptional cases was allowed. He was not only radical in his search for truth to his church and its traditions but also a radical lover of peace. The Veterans' Association in Leuze glorified the War of 1871 and wanted to devote the town flags to war, but Schrempf refused to bless the flags. He was even more radical than the former peace societies. In a lecture at the 1886 Stuttgart Branch of the German Peace Society, he said: tolerated Christianity and war are not. The Christian must be obliged by saying of Jesus, on the so-called right of losing self-defense. Who lives in the conviction that the war is wrong, which must and consequences and explain to the magistrate that he would not bear arms and that he would rather die himself before he was ready to kill his enemy. Schrempf was convinced that a Christian must be a conscientious objector. This pacifist theology of peace was in his time a very lonely and isolated position. The Christians of his time went to war in good conscience and only a few pastors preached for just peace as he did. To overcome war and violence is an enduring task. Schrempf also suggested that: violence against women, violence in schools, the right-wing violence on our streets, violence against foreigners must be overcome.

== Collected works ==
His collected works appeared in Frommann Verlag, Stuttgart, 1930–1940, in 16 volumes. Posthumously published in several volumes, edited by Otto Engel in Fromman, other writings under the title "religion without religion" (Volume 3, 1947).

- 1: For the Church against the Church (1930)
- 2: Still under the spell of the Church (1930)
- 3: Still under the spell of morals (1931)
- 4: About the Rubicon (1931)
- 5: Confrontations 1 - Kant, Lessing (1931)
- 6: Confrontations 2, Goethe (1932)
- 7: Still on this side - even beyond (1932)
- 8: II Even beyond this world and beyond - this side. (1933)
- 9: Conflict 3 - Socrates, Nietzsche, Paul (1934)
- 10: IV disputes - Søren Kierkegaard, Part One (1935)
- 11: Ditto Part Two (1935)
- 12: ditto - Part Three (1935)
- 13: My Testament with Portrait (1937)
- 14: The basis of ethics. Treatise on the basis of the Evangelical Theological Faculty of Tübingen made price task (Spring 1884). Edited by Otto Engel (1936)
- 15: Many things on the road. Edited by Otto Engel (1939)
- 16: The Legacy. Edited by Otto Engel. (1940)

== Translator ==
Schrempf translated many books written by Søren Kierkegaard into German beginning with Begrebet Angest in 1890.

== Honors ==
The Christoph Schrempf High School (Christoph-Schrempf Gymnasium) in Besigheim, Germany, is named after him.

== Sources ==
=== Books ===
Zoske, Horst (1974). Carl Huppenbauer: Neue Deutsche Biographie (in German). Vol. 10. Berlin: Duncker & Humblot. p. 75.

Engel, O. Elisabet Schrempf 1890-1948, Trauerrede (in German). Frommanns Vlg.

Stäbler, F. (1927). Christoph Schrempf: Sonderdruck in "Die Tat" (in German). Verlag Diederichs.

=== Online ===
- Wagner, Father, Harald (2009). "Christoph Schrempf - ein Liebhaber der Wahrheit und des Friedens" (PDF) (in German). Heiningen, Germany: www.ev-kirchengemeinde-heiningen.de. Archived from the original (PDF) on July 19, 2011.
- Pioneer of Existential Philosophy (in German)
