= Battle of Schellenberg order of battle =

The following units and commanders fought at the Battle of Schellenberg on July 2, 1704.

== Allied army ==
- Unless otherwise noted, all regiments had one battalion.

=== Left Wing ===
John Churchill, Duke of Marlborough

==== Advance Guard ====
Division	Brigade	Regiments and Others
Lieutenant General Johan Wijnand van Goor	Fergusson's Brigade (Scottish)	1st Guards; Orkney (2 battalions); Ingoldsby; Meredith
Lieutenant General Johan Wijnand van Goor	Beinheim's Brigade	Goor; Beinheim & Rechteren (Dutch); Hirzel & Sturler (Swiss/Dutch); Heidebrecht (Ansbach)
Lieutenant General Johan Wijnand van Goor	Montfort's Brigade	Imperial Grenadiers (Austrian); Erffa's Grenadiers (Franconia); Monfort's Grenadiers (Swabian)
Lieutenant General Henry Lumley	Wood's Brigade (English)	Wood (two squadrons); Wyndham (two squadrons); Schomberg (two squadrons); Cadogen; Lumley (three squadrons)
Lieutenant General Henry Lumley	Ross's Brigade (English)	Erbprinz Dragoons (four squadrons) (Hesse-Kassel); Ross's Dragoons (two squadrons); Hay's Dragoons
Lieutenant General Reinhard Vincent Graf von Hompesch	Schulenburg's Brigade (Dutch)	Schulenburg Dragoons (four squadrons) (Hanoveran); Erbach (two squadrons); Baldwin (two squadrons)
Lieutenant General Reinhard Vincent Graf von Hompesch	Auroch's Brigade	Schmettau Dragoons (four squadrons) (Ansbach); Leib zu Pferde (two squadrons) (Hesse-Kassel)
Lieutenant General Reinhard Vincent Graf von Hompesch	Noyelles' Brigade	Noyelles (two squadrons); Voight (two squadrons); Leib zu Pferde (two squadrons)

==== Main Body ====
General Charles Churchill

Division	Brigade	Regiments and Others
Lieutenant General Richard Ingoldsby	Wither's Brigade (English)	North & Gray; Derby; Fergusson; Marlborough
Lieutenant General Richard Ingoldsby	Pallandt's Brigade	Erbprinz Hesse-Kassel; Varenne & Wulffen (Prussian); Schwerin (Mecklenburg)
Lieutenant General Herbeville	Bernsdorf's Brigade (Hanoverian)	Bernsdorf; 1st Rantzau; Tozin; 1st Gardes
Lieutenant General Herbeville	De Luc's Brigade (Hanoverian)	Hulsen; De Breuil; de Luc; Tecklenburg
Lieutenant General Horn	Seckendorff's Brigade	Leib Grenadiers; Hermann (Württemberg); Sternfels (Württemberg); Seckendorf (Ansbach)
Lieutenant General Horn	St. Paul's Brigade (Hesse-Kassel)	St. Paul (Hanoverian); Wartensleben; Stuckrath; Schopping

==== Reserve ====
Division	Brigade	Regiments and Others
Lieutenant General George Hamilton, 1st Earl of Orkney	Hamilton's Brigade (English)	Churchill; Webb; Howe; Hamilton; Rowe
Lieutenant General George Hamilton, 1st Earl of Orkney	Wilken's Brigade (Hesse-Kassel)	Leib; Prinz Wilhelm; Erbprinz; Grenadier
Lieutenant General George Hamilton, 1st Earl of Orkney	Rantzau's Brigade (Hanoverian)	Gauvin; D'Herleville; 2nd Gardes; 2nd Rantzau
Lieutenant General Cuno Josua von Bülow	Hesse-Homberg's Brigade	Grieffendorf Dragoons (three squadrons) (Saxe-Gotha); Sachsen-Heilburg (two squadrons) (Dutch); Bannier (two squadrons) (Hanoverian)
Lieutenant General Cuno Josua von Bülow	Erbach's Brigade	Hardenberg Dragoons (three squadrons) (Saxe-Gotha); Erbach (two squadrons) (Dutch); Spiegel (two squadrons) (Hesse-Kassel)
Lieutenant General Cuno Josua von Bülow	Villers' Brigade (Hanoverians)	Bothmar Dragoons (four squadrons); Villars Dragoons (four squadrons); Bulow Dragoons (three squadrons)

==== Artillery ====
Colonel Holcroft Blood

- twenty 3-pounders
- ten 9-pounders
- six 12-pounders
- four howitzers

=== Right Wing ===
Louis William, Margrave of Baden

==== Infantry ====
General Johann Karl Graf von Thüngen

Division	Brigade	Regiments and Others
Lieutenant General Graf von Frise	Fuchs' Brigade	Baden (two battalions) (Austrian); Salm (two battalions) (Austrian); Bibra (Wurzburg); Fuchs (Wurzburg)
Lieutenant General Graf von Frise	Bevern's Brigade	Tollet (two battalions) (Austrian); Bevern (Brunswick); Bernsdorff (Brunswick)
Lieutenant General Graf von Furstenburg	Wald's Brigade (Franconian)	Erff (two battalions); Schebelin (two battalions); Wald (two battalions)
Lieutenant General Graf von Furstenburg	Reisbach's Brigade	Torte (Franconian); Reisbach (two battalions) (Swabian); Roth (two battalions) (Swabian)

==== Cavalry ====
General Hermann Otto II of Limburg Stirum (mw)

Division	Brigade	Regiments and Others
Lieutenant General Baron von Bibra	Prinz Alexandre's Brigade	Styrum Dragoons (six squadrons) (Austrian); Fechenbach Dragoons (four squadrons) (Wurzburg)
Lieutenant General Baron von Bibra	Cusani's Brigade (Austrian)	Gronsfeld (six squadrons); Hohenzollern (six squadrons)
Prince von Württemberg	Mercy's Brigade (Austrian)	Mercy (six squadrons); Alt-Hanover (six squadrons)
Prince von Württemberg	Erff's Brigade	Helmstatt Dragoons (four squadrons) (Württemberg); Castell Dragoons (six squadrons) (Austrian)
Reserve; Lieutenant General Count de la Tour	Fugger's Brigade	Xanthe (six squadrons) (Austrian); Alt-Darmstadt (six squadrons) (Austrian); Aufsess Dragoons (five squadrons) (Franconian)
Reserve; Lieutenant General Count de la Tour	Bayreuth's Brigade	Leutsch (two squadrons) (Saxe-Gotha); Oettingen Dragoons (four squadrons) (Swabian); Erbprinz Württemberg (four squadrons) (Swabian); Bayreuth (five squadrons) (Franconian)
Reserve; Lieutenant General Count de la Tour	Bibra's Brigade	Bibra (six squadrons) (Mainz); Cusani (six squadrons) (Austrian); Osten (two squadrons) (Holstein)
Reserve; Lieutenant General Count de la Tour	Montfort's Brigade	Imperial Grenadiers (Austrian); Erffa's Grenadiers (Franconian); Monfort's Grenadiers (Swabian)

== Franco-Bavarian Army ==
Jean Baptist, Comte d'Arco
Second in command: Alessandro, Marquis de Maffei

Division	Brigade	Regiments and Others
Infantry	French Brigade Brigadier General de Montandre	Bearn (two battalions); Nivernais (one battalion)
Infantry	Bavarian Brigade Major General Lutzelburg	Leib Grenadiers (one battalion); Leib Regiment (two battalions); Lutzelburg Regiment (two battalions); Boismorel Grenadiers
Infantry	Bavarian Brigade Major General Maffei	Mercy Regiment (three battalions); Maffei Regiment (two battalions); Kurprinz Regiment (three battalions)
Infantry	French Brigade Major General Lee	Nettancourt Regiment (two battalions); Toulouse Regiment (one battalion)
Infantry	De Bordet's Brigade	Toulouse Regiment (one battalion); Croonders Regiment (two battalions)
Infantry	Artillery	Sixteen 6-pounders deployed in two eight gun batteries
Cavalry	Monasterol's Dragoon Brigade	Fontbeausrd's French Dragoons (three squadrons); Monasterol's Bavarian Dragoons (two squadrons); Santini's Bavarian Dragoons (one squadrons); Listenois's French Dragoons (three squadrons)
Lieutenant General Torring Seefeld	Weickel's Brigade	Arco's Cuirassiers (six squadrons); Weikel's Brigade (six squadrons)
Lieutenant General Torring Seefeld	De Costa's Brigade	Wolframsdorff's Cuirassiers (six squadrons); Costa's Cuirassiers (six squadrons); Locatelli's Hussars (two squadrons)
