= Marchese Maffei =

Marchese Maffei ('marquis of Maffei') may refer to:

- Alessandro Maffei (1662–1730), Italian general
- Francesco Scipione Maffei (1675–1755), Italian writer
- Carlo Alberto Ferdinando Maffei di Boglio (1834–1897), Italian diplomat
