= Battle of Krottensee =

1703 battle of the War of the Spanish Succession

- Part of the War of Spanish Succession
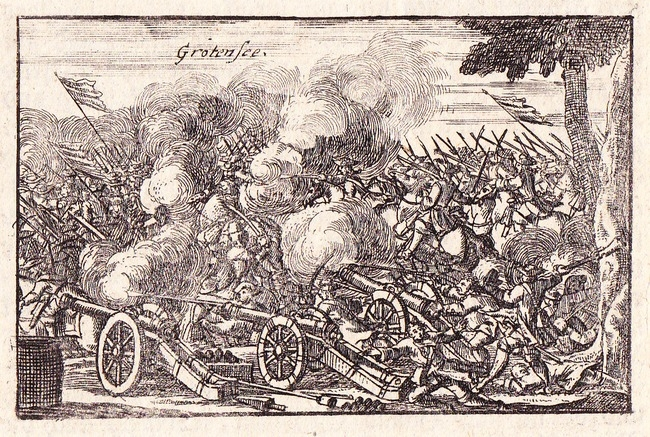
- Schlacht bei Krötensee 1703 engraving
Date	23 May 1703
Location	Krottensee near Neuhaus an der Pegnitz, Franconian Circle (present day Middle Franconia, Bavaria, Germany)
Result	Holy Roman victory

Belligerents
Holy Roman Empire	Electorate of Bavaria

Commanders and leaders
Lebrecht Gottfried Jahnus von Eberstädt	Alessandro Maffei

Strength
2,600	2,000

Casualties and losses
70	600

The Battle of Krottensee (German: Schlacht bei Krottensee) was a battle that took place during the War of the Spanish Succession near Krottensee, a town located to the east of Neuhaus an der Pegnitz. The battle was fought between forces of the Holy Roman Empire under Lebrecht Gottfried Jahnus von Eberstädt and forces of the Electorate of Bavaria under Alessandro Maffei.

== Background ==
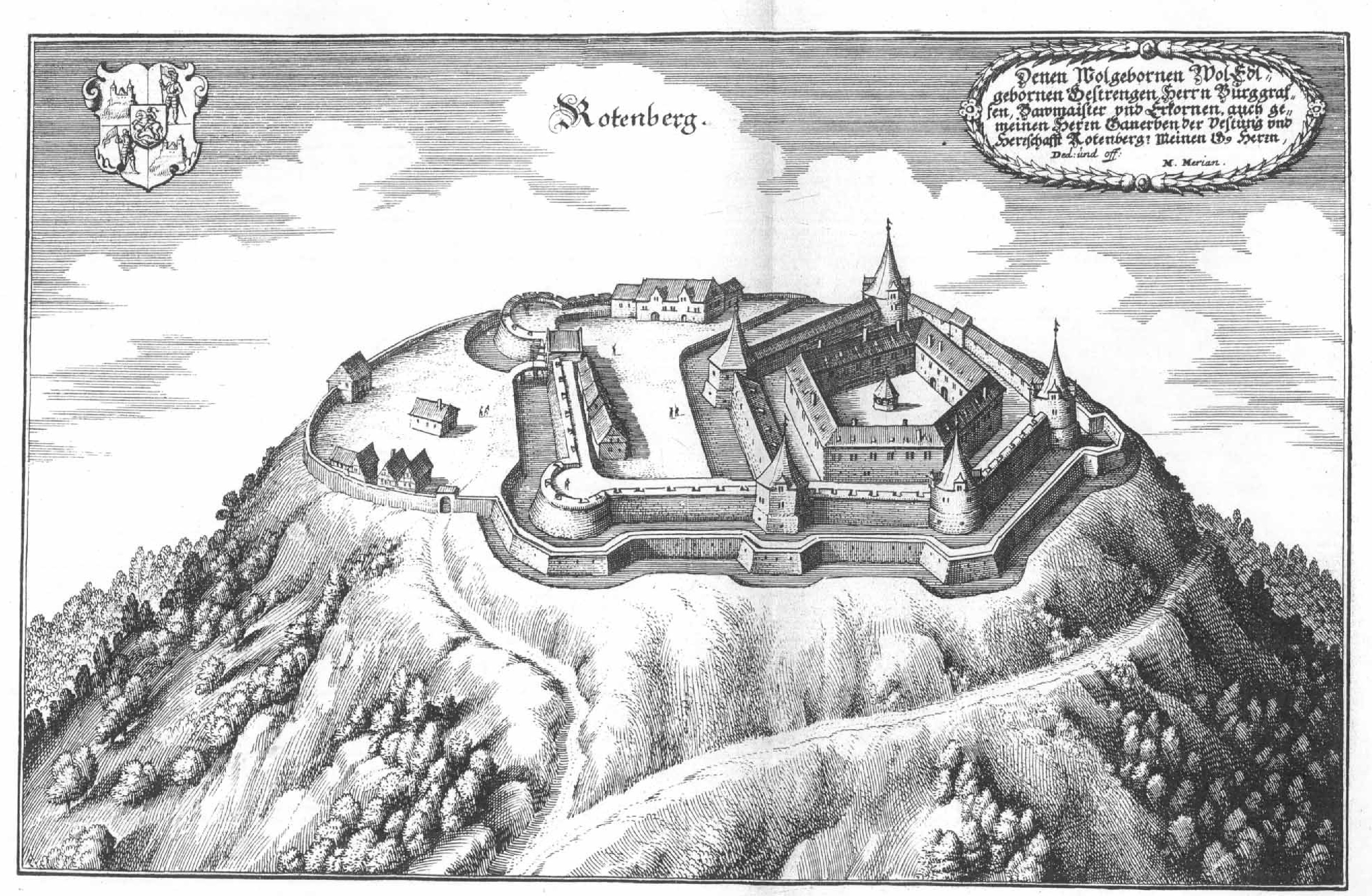
The earlier castle on the Rothenberg (Matthäus Merian: Topographia Franconiae, 1648)

In early 1703 Maximilian II Emanuel, Elector of Bavaria campaigned along the Danube in order to exert dominance of the Danube valley in Bavaria against the invading armies of Louis William, Margrave of Baden-Baden. The Electorate of Bavaria at the time allied with the Kingdom of France against the Holy Roman Empire.

Beginning on 8 May 1703 units of the Army of the Holy Roman Empire together with allies of the Franconian Circle under the command of Jahnus von Eberstädt sieged the Rothenberg Fortress near Schnaittach. Eberstädt had seen previous victories in the Upper Palatinate, especially at the Battle of Schmidmühlen.

On 10 May 1703 General Alessandro Maffei received orders to relieve the besieged troops at Rothenberg. Maffei's command numbered 2,000 men and consisted of one battalion of his own regiment, two battalions of the Spielberg Regiment, one march battalion of militia, two squadrons of dragoons, and four three-pound cannons. Eberstädt's command numbered 2,600 men.

Outnumbered, Maffei's command retreated across the Pegnitz River at Neuhaus an der Pegnitz and sent a dispatch to Field Marshall Jean Baptist, Comte d'Arco requesting reinforcements in order to take Rothenberg. Eberstädt left a small detachment behind at Rothenberg and marched after Maffei's forces.

== Battle ==
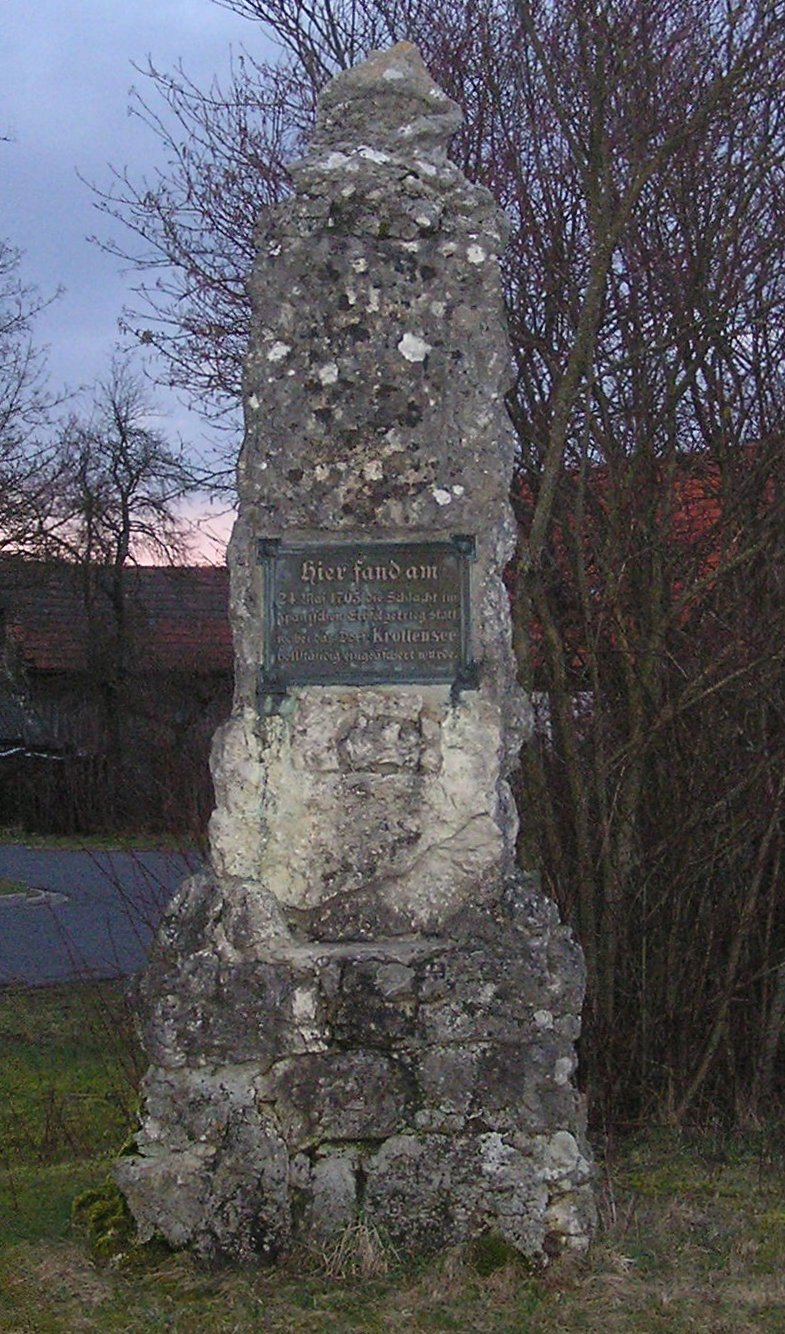
Memorial obelisk of the battle of Krottensee

On 23 May 1703 Eberstädt marched his forces up the Pegnitz River to the heights near the village of Krottensee where he attacked Maffei's Bavarian army. During the battle the wind blew gunpowder smoke into the direction of Maffei's army which obscured their vision, this was further exploited by Eberstädt's officers Löffelholz, Tucher, and Boyneburg who drove the Bavarians back towards Krottensee. Krottensee was eventually burned while Maffei's wounded were looted.

Maffei's forces were nearly routed at Krottensee and were forced to retreat southward to Hohenstadt. During the battle Maffei's forces lost the majority of their baggage train which contained 10,000 Florins, along with 600 casualties. Eberstädt's forces suffered a total of 70 casualties.

== Aftermath ==
News of Maffei's defeat eventually reached Maximilian Emanuel who feared another incursion into the Upper Palatinate by Holy Roman and Franconian Circle troops, he eventually abandoned the idea of an attack on Passau.
