= Merope (Messenia) =

Greek mythological figure

Merope (Ancient Greek: Μερόπη, romanized: Merópē, lit. 'with her face turned', derived from μέρος meros "part" and ὤψ ops "face, eye"; pronounced /ˈmɛrəpiː/, MEH-roh-pee) was a Queen of Messenia in Greek mythology, daughter of King Cypselus of Arcadia and wife of Cresphontes, the Heraclid king of Messenia. After the murder of her husband and her two older children by Polyphontes (another Heraclid), Merope was forced to marry the murderer, but she managed to save her youngest son Aepytus, whom she sent secretly to Aetolia. Several years later, when Aepytus grew up, he killed Polyphontes with the collaboration of Merope, and he took revenge for the murder of his relatives and the insult to his mother.

== Euripides' Cresphontes ==
Euripides based his lost tragedy Cresphontes (Κρεσφόντης, Kresphóntēs) on this myth.

According to Hyginus' description of the plot (Fabulae 137), Merope's son (in this version also named Cresphontes), once grown, set in motion the plan to avenge his father's death by presenting himself incognito to Polyphontes as his own killer, claiming the price Polyphontes had put on his head. As the tired young man slept, "Merope, believing the sleeping man to be her son's murderer, came into the room with an axe, unwittingly intending to slay her own son".

Plutarch quotes a line spoken by Merope in this scene in his essay On Meat-Eating (Moralia 998e) and adds, "what a stir she rouses in the theatre as she brings them to their feet in terror lest she wound the youth before the old man [who had served as secret messenger between mother and son] can stop her!"

Aristotle cites this as an intended action that would have been performed involuntarily due to Merope's ignorance of the particular circumstances of the action: "one might think one's son was an enemy, as Merope did" (Nicomachean Ethics III.1, 1111a11-12, trans. Ross). Hyginus continues: "When Merope realised her enemy had given her the opportunity of avenging herself, she made things up with Polyphontes. As the joyful king was performing a religious ceremony his guest, falsely pretending to have killed the victim, killed him and regained his paternal kingdom."

== Maffei's Merope ==
Scipione Maffei premiered his tragedy Merope in Verona on June 12, 1713; it quickly became popular throughout Italy and beyond: "It was everywhere translated, everywhere mouthed and discussed. It was talked about by Voltaire and by Lessing and at last it got as far as Goethe." Catherine Mary Phillimore wrote:

It is a strong proof of the power of Maffei's mind that without [a love intrigue], he should have succeeded in winning the public favour at a period when a romance of some kind was considered indispensable to any drama. Maffei wrote his Merope with the intention of proving that it was possible to excite the sympathy and sustain the interest of the audience by a plot depending entirely on the strong affection existing between mother and son, when brought out and placed in a vivid light by situations of extreme peril.

By agreement with Maffei, Voltaire went on to adapt the play, which was eventually staged in 1743 as Mérope. Further adaptations were subsequently produced by Aaron Hill in 1749 in England and by Friedrich Wilhelm Gotter in Germany in 1774. There were also two independent English treatments of the story, one by George Jeffreys in 1731, and Matthew Arnold's of 1858. In his introduction to the latter, Arnold surveyed the European development of the story and explained that he had reworked into his own dramatic poem the fifty lines still recorded of the lost Greek original.

== Sources ==
- M.J. Cropp, "Cresphontes," in Collard, Cropp, and Lee (eds.), Euripides: Selected Fragmentary Plays I (Warminster: Aris & Phillips, 1995), pp. 121–147
