= Francesco Scipione Maffei =

Italian writer and art critic (1675 – 1755)

Francesco Scipione Maffei FRS
- Engraving by Giovanni Marco Pitteri, after Giambettino Cignaroli
- Born: 1 June 1675; Verona, Republic of Venice, now Italy
- Died: 11 February 1755 (aged 79); Verona, Republic of Venice, now Italy
- Occupations: Dramatist, Archaeologist, Soldier

Francesco Scipione Maffei (Italian: [franˈtʃesko ʃʃiˈpjoːne mafˈfɛi]; 1 June 1675 – 11 February 1755) was an Italian writer and art critic, author of many articles and plays. An antiquarian with a humanist education whose publications on Etruscan antiquities stand as incunables of Etruscology, he engaged in running skirmishes in print with his rival in the field of antiquities, Antonio Francesco Gori.

== Early career ==
Maffei was of the illustrious family that originated in Bologna; his brother was General Alessandro Maffei, whose memoirs he edited and published. He studied for five years in Parma, at the Jesuit College, and afterwards, from 1698, at Rome, where he became a member of the Accademia degli Arcadi; on his return to Verona he established a local Arcadia.

In 1703, he volunteered to fight for Bavaria in the War of Spanish Succession, and saw action in 1704 at the Battle of Schellenberg, near Donauwörth. His brother, Alessandro, was second in command at the battle.

In 1709, he went to Padua, where he briefly collaborated with Apostolo Zeno and Antonio Valisnieri in editing the ambitious literary periodical the Giornale de' Letterati d'Italia, which had but a short career.

== Theatre projects ==
Subsequently, an acquaintance with the actor Riccoboni led him to exert himself for the improvement of dramatic art in Italy and a revitalized Italian theatre. His masterpiece, the tragedy Merope, 1714, brought him popularity in Europe; it was famed for its rapid action and the elimination of the prologue and chorus. Other works for the theatre include Teatro Italiano, a small collection of works for presentation on the stage, in 1723–1725; and Le Ceremonie, an original comedy, in 1728. A complete edition of his works appeared at Venice (28 vols. 8vo in 1790).

== His collections and antiquarian publications ==
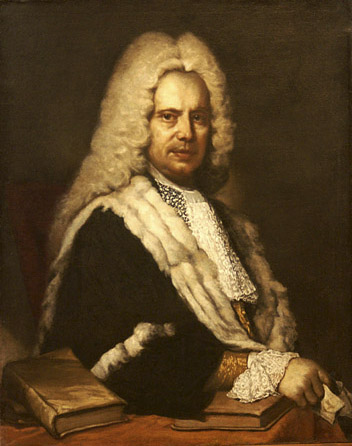
Portrait of Scipione Maffei by Fra Galgario, Verona, Museo Canonicale

In 1710, he spent some time studying the manuscripts in the Royal Library at Turin; while there he arranged the collection of objects of art which the late Carlo Emanuele, Duke of Savoy had brought from Rome. From 1718 he became especially interested in the archaeology of his native town, and his investigations resulted in the valuable Verona illustrata (1731–1732).

Maffei devoted the years 1732–1736 to travel in France, England, the Netherlands and Germany. In 1732 he went to the south of France for purposes of archaeological research and from there he went to Paris, where he remained four years and was received as member of the Académie des Inscriptions et Belles Lettres. On a visit to London in 1736, he was elected a Fellow of the Royal Society and received at Oxford University, where he was honoured with a doctoral degree; he returned through Holland and Germany to Verona. He was a friend of Francesco Algarotti, who wrote him many letters.

On his return to Verona, he built a museum, which he bequeathed, together with his valuable archaeological and artistic collection, to his native city. He bequeathed his collection of manuscripts to the canons of the cathedral of Verona. In later life he became interested in astronomy and physics, and built an observatory to study the stars.

Collection of Francesco Scipione
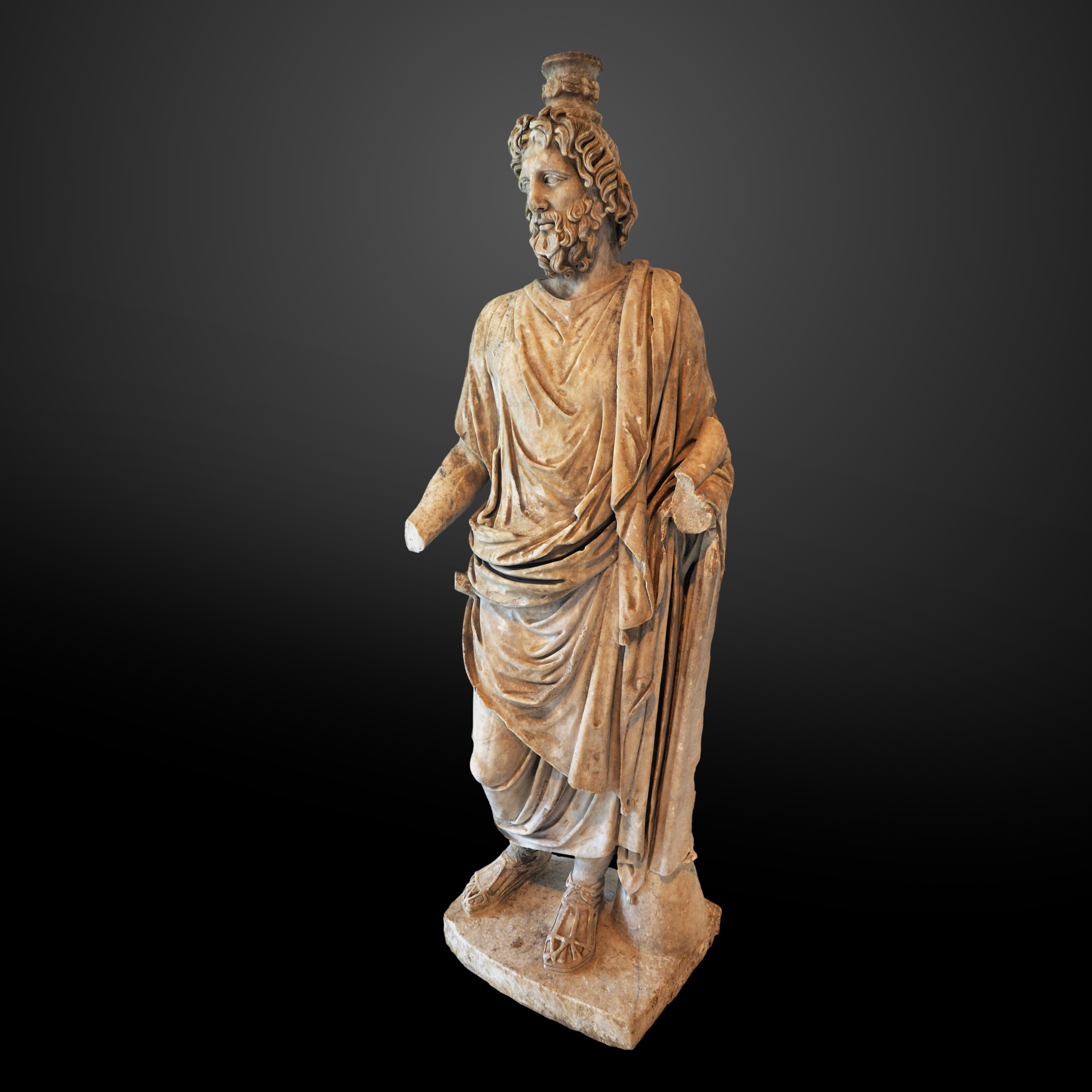
Statue of Serapis, made in the region of Verona in the early 2nd century from marble from Mount Pentelicus, owned by Francesco Scipione in the 18th century. On display at Musée d'Art et d'Histoire in Geneva.

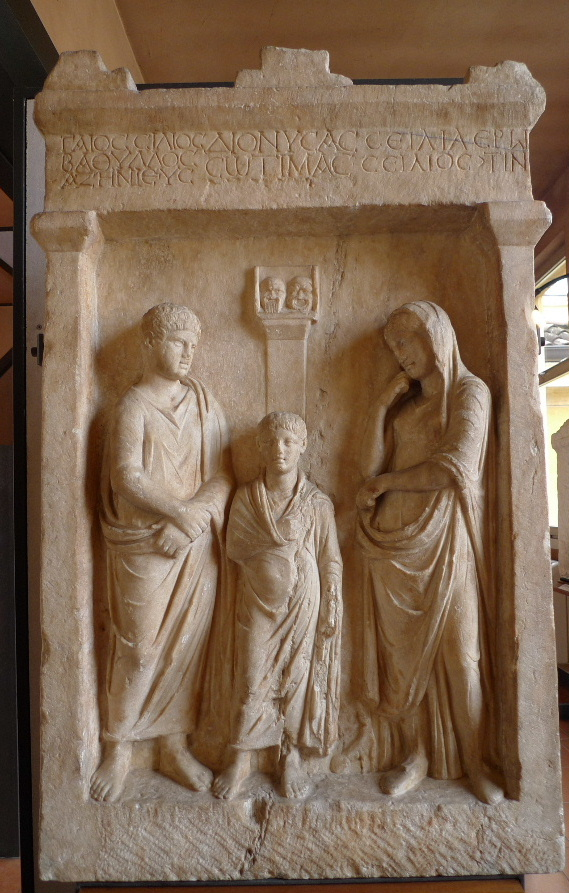
Funerary monument to an actor family of Gaios Silios Bathyllos. On display at Museum-Lapidarium of Maffei.

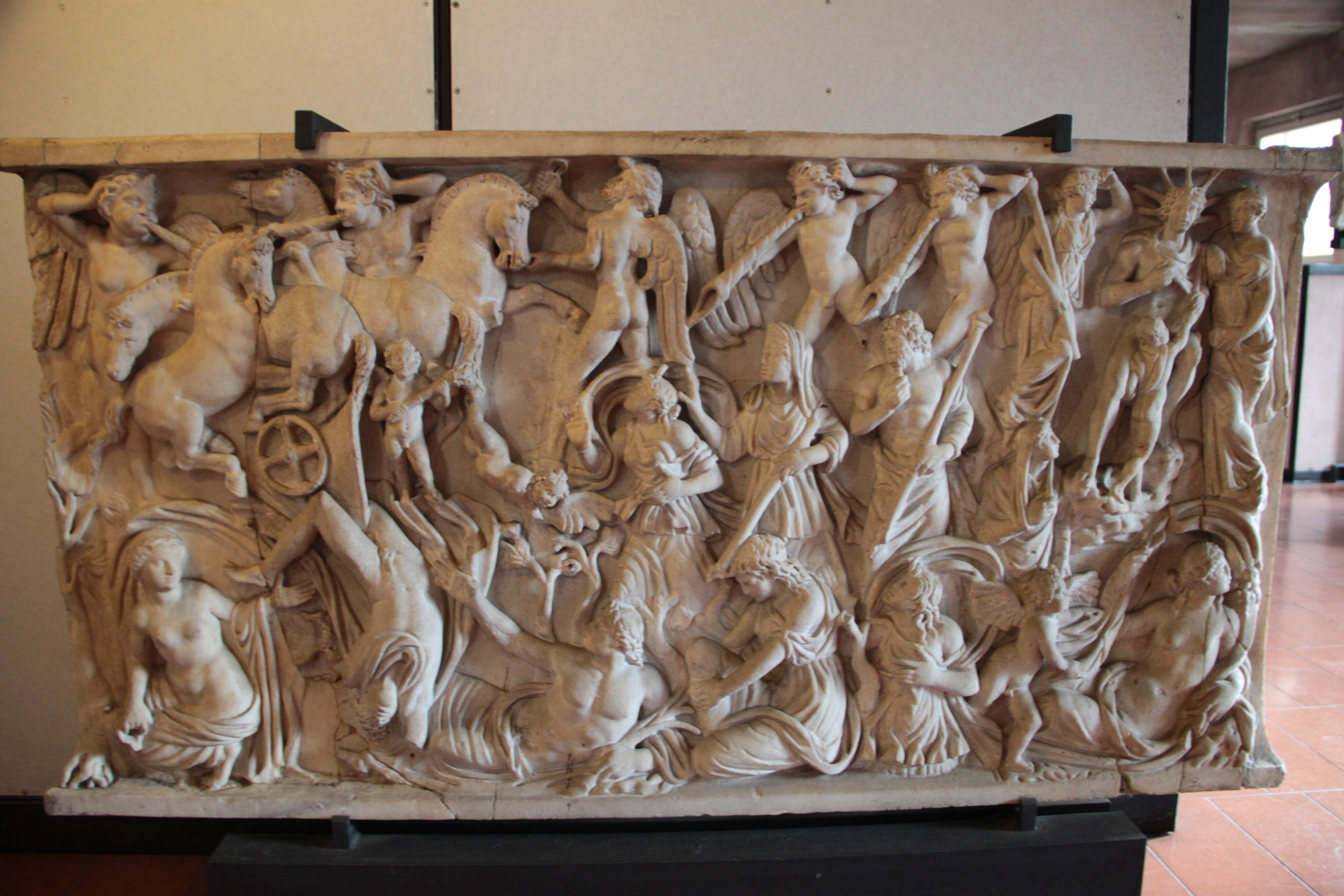
Sarcophagus with myth of Phaeton. Panel of a sarcophagus. Marble. 3d century A.D. Verona, Museum-Lapidarium of Maffei.

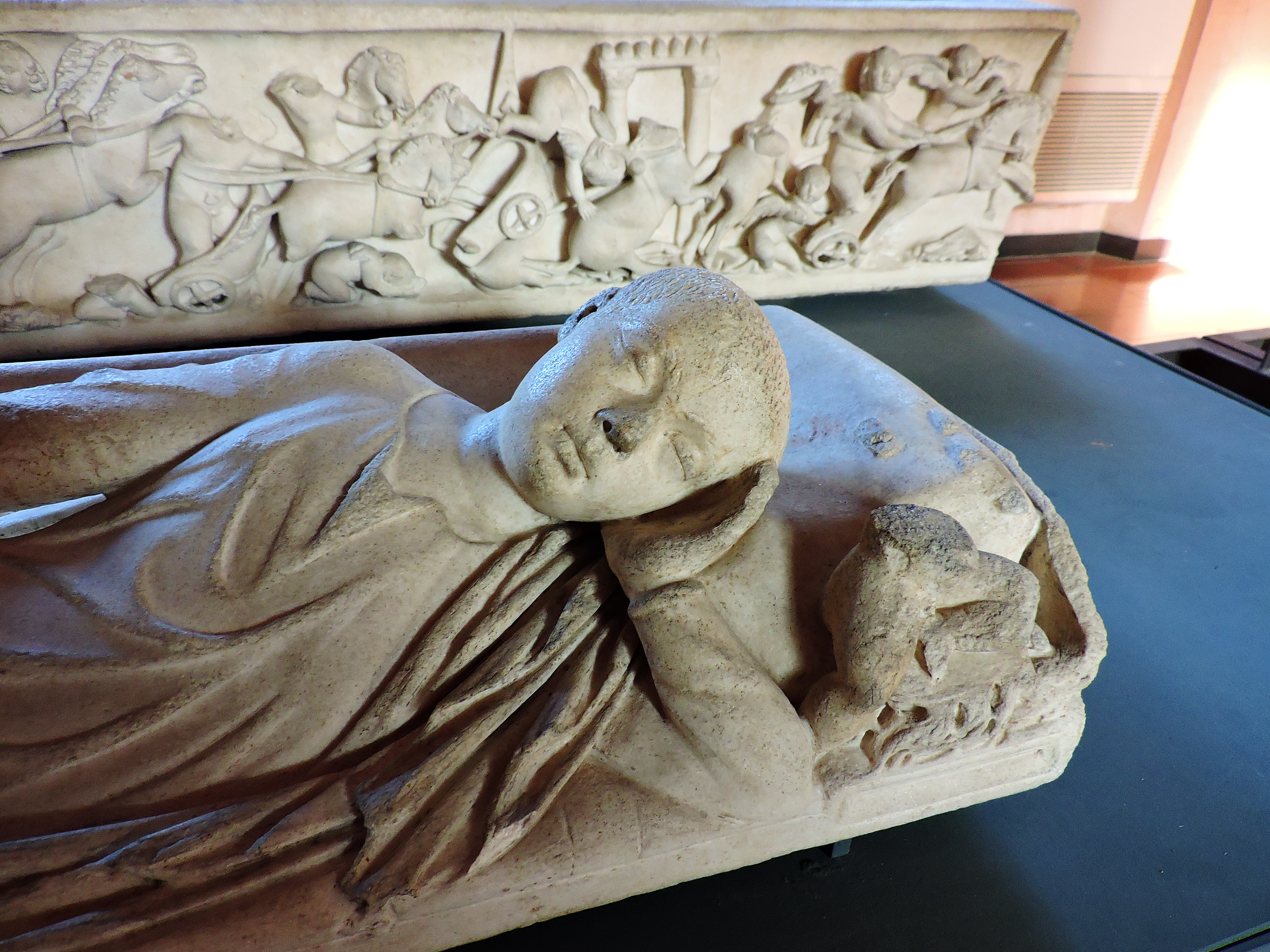
Sarcophagus cover with deceased youth supine and resting his head on two cushions, 3rd century AD. On display at Museum-Lapidarium of Maffei.

== Philosophical treatises ==
Upon returning from his journey in 1736, Maffei wrote the Consiglio politico addressed to the Venetian government. In the treatise, Maffei questioned the structure of Venice's aristocratic government, and suggested the opening of public offices to the elites of the Venetian mainland domains. Ultimately, the Consiglio politico advocated introducing into the government of the Republic of Venice elements of political representation, which Maffei had identified in his antiquarian studies of the Roman constitution, and later observed in foreign lands during his European travels. Maffei did not actually present his Consiglio politico to the Venetian government. The treatise was only published posthumously, shortly before the fall of the Republic of Venice in 1797. It circulated during the Risorgimento, and might have influenced Carlo Cattaneo's federalist ideas.

The Jesuits requested Maffei to write in defence of the orthodox system of grace against the doctrine of the Jansenists, which resulted in his Istoria teologica delle doctrine e delle opinione corse ne cinque primo secoli della chiesa in proposito della divina grazia, del libero arbitrio e della predestinazione, published at Trent, 1742.

He also published a letter and a book arguing against the existence of supernatural magic and witches, that mixes both enlightenment thinking and theologic arguments based on scripture. This letter on magic was subsequently printed in Augustin Calmet's dissertation on magic and vampires titled Traité sur les apparitions des esprits et sur les vampires ou les revenans de Hongrie, de Moravie, &c. (1751).

== Posthumous reputation ==
The secondary school 'Liceo Maffei' in Verona is named in his honour.

He is also known for having written a description of Bartolomeo Cristofori's invention of a hammer mechanism for the harpsichord, work widely considered to comprise the invention of the piano. Maffei published the article in the Giornale de' Letterati d’Italia in 1711. Maffei was one of the editors of the Giornale. Maffei reprinted the article in his Rime e Prose, a collection of some of his writings, published in Venice in 1719.

The Italian poet and translator Ippolito Pindemonte published a biographical elegy on his friend.

== Selected publications ==
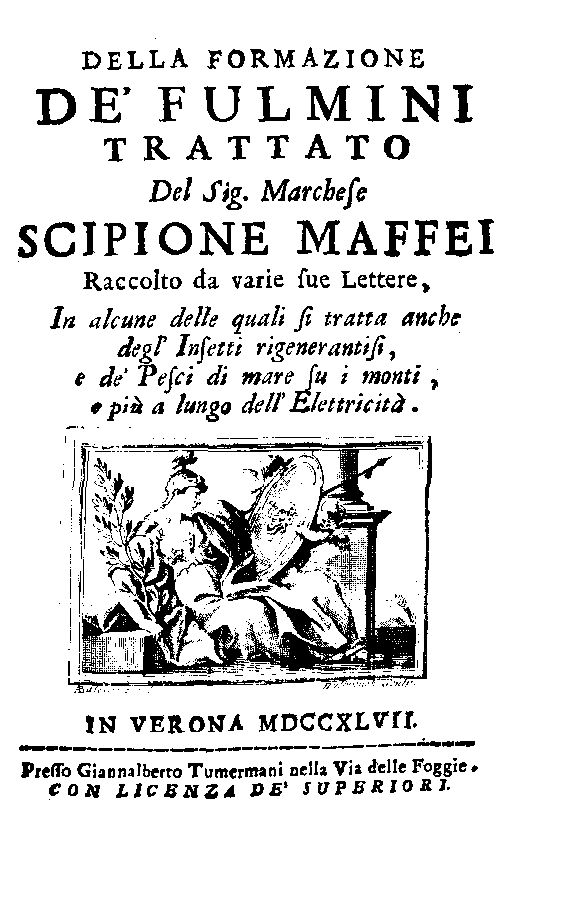
Della formazione de' fulmini, 1747

- Per la nascita del principe di Piemonte genteliaco (Rome, 1699); *Conclusioni di amore (Verona, 1702);
- La prima radunanza della colonia arcadica Veronese (Cervia, 1705);
- La scienza cavalleresca (Rome, 1710), a treatise against duelling;
- De fabula equestris ordinis Constantiniani (Zurich, 1712; Paris, 1714), written to prove that the orders of knighthood all date only from the Crusades and affording valuable information concerning the aristocracy of the early Middle Ages;
- Scipione Maffei (1745) [1714], La Merope, Tragedia. (With annotations by Voltaire ed.), Verona: Dionigi Ramanzini
- Dell' antica condizione di Verona (Venice, 1719);
- Istoria diplomatica (Mantua, 1727), publishing original documents;
- Teatro del Marchese Maffei (Venice, 1730), his collected works for the theater, including La Merope, La Ceremonie, La Fida Ninfa;
- Marchese Scipione Maffei (1732), Verona Illustrata (First Part with the history of the City and that of Ancient Venice, until the arrival of Charlemagne to Italy. ed.), Verona: Jacopo Vallarsi, e Pierantonio Berno, OL 24971432M
- Marchese Scipione Maffei (1734), Galliae antiquitates quaedam selectae atque in plures epistolas distributae ad Parisiunum exemplar Iterum Edita. (First published in Paris, on the inscriptions and monuments observed by Maffei during his sojourn in France and dedicated to Louis XV ed.), Verona: Jacobum Vallarsium, OL 3549644M
- Consiglio politico finora inedito presentato al governo veneto nell'anno 1736 (1736; published in Venice, 1797);
- Graecorum siglae lapidariae collectae atque explicatae (Verona, 1746);
- Della formazione dei fulmini (Verona, 1747);
- Della formazione de' fulmini (in Italian). Verona: Giovanni Alberto Tumermani. 1747.
- Il Raguet (Verona, 1787), a comedy;
- Marchese Scipione Maffei (1749), Museum veronense, hoc est, Antiquarum inscriptionum atque anaglyphorum collectio, Verona: Typis Seminarii, OL 24653087M
- Supplemento al Tesoro delle Inscrizioni di Muratori (Lucca, 1765); this was published by Donati according to notes collected by Maffei for a complete work on inscriptions
- Marchese Scipione Maffei (1750), Arte magica dileguata, Lettera. (Second ed.), Verona: Agostino Carratoni, nella Via Nova, OL 3136932M
- Marchese Scipione Maffei (1754), De' teatri antichi, e moderni, Trattato in cui Diversi Punti Morali Appartenenti a Teatro. (Second ed.), Verona: Presso Agostino Carattoni, OL 24735947M

Besides these original works Maffei also collaborated in editions of the works of St. Hilary (Verona, 1730), St. Jerome (1734), and St. Zeno (1739).

== See also ==
Mérope - a tragedy by Voltaire based on an adaptation of Maffei's drama
