= Assault on Brussels (1708) =

Battle of the War of the Spanish Succession

- Part of the War of the Spanish Succession
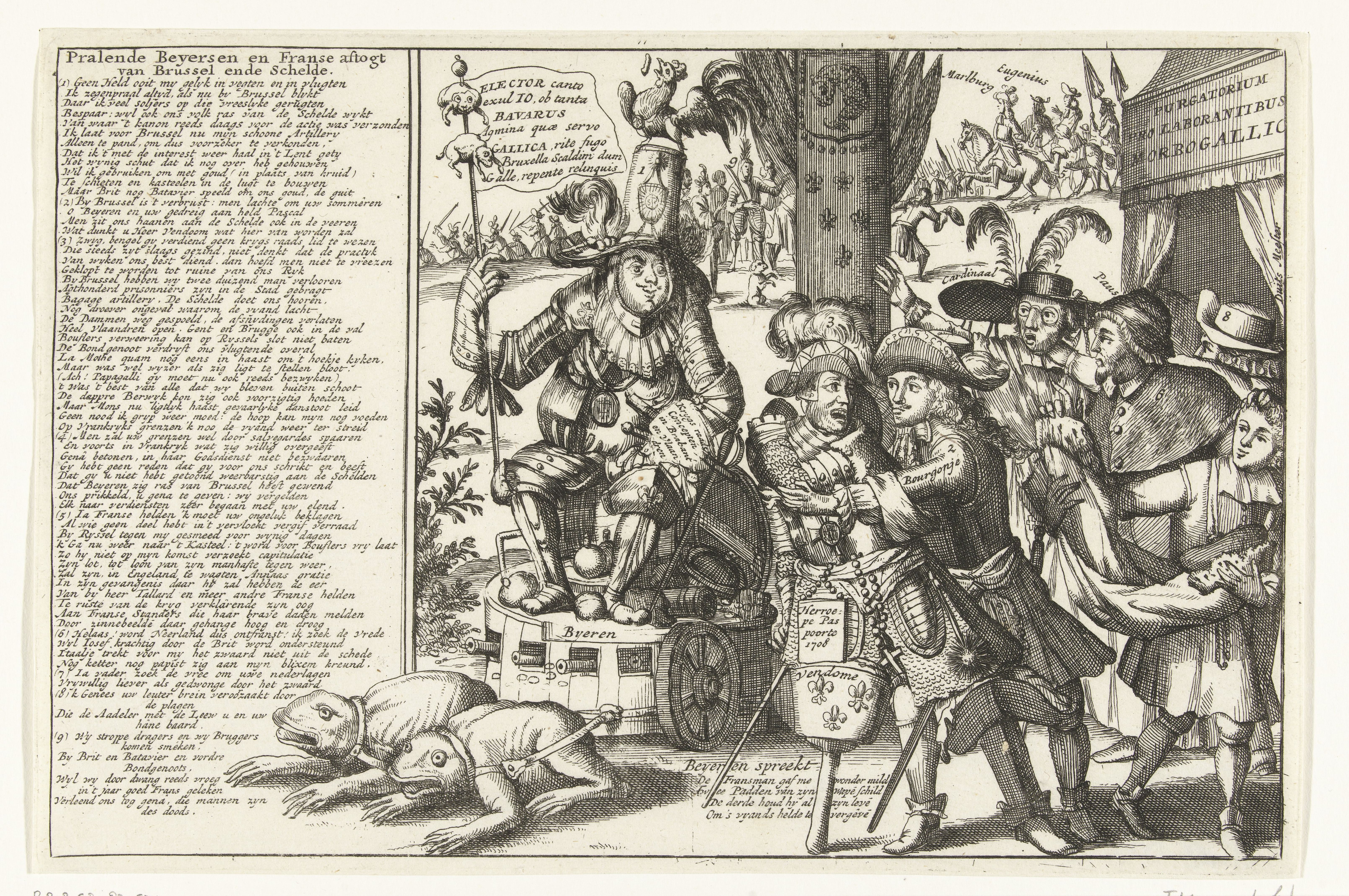
- Caricature of the retreat of the Elector of Bavaria and the Duke of Vendôme, 1708. The Elector is depicted sitting on a chariot pulled by toads. Verses are included on the print in both Dutch and Latin.
Date	22 November 1708 – 27 November 1708
Location	Brussels, Spanish Netherlands
Result	Grand Alliance victory

Belligerents
Grand Alliance: Pro-Habsburg Spain; Dutch Republic; Holy Roman Empire; Great Britain	France; Bavaria; Pro Bourbon Spain

Commanders and leaders
François de Pascale	(Electorate of Bavaria) Maximilian of Bavaria; (Kingdom of France) Jean Baptist, Comte d'Arco

Strength
6,000	15,000

Casualties and losses
613 killed or wounded Siege; 413 killed or wounded Relief action 200 killed or wounded	3,550 killed or wounded Siege; 2,500 killed or wounded Relief action 650 killed or wounded

The assault on Brussels or siege of Brussels occurred during the War of the Spanish Succession, from 22 to 27 November 1708 involving French and pro-Bourbon Spanish troops under Maximilian of Bavaria against the garrison and citizens of the city of Brussels.

While the army of the Grand Alliance was occupied with the Siege of Lille, the Elector of Bavaria, Maximilian, made an attempt to capture Brussels. He believed the city, with its weak defenses and small garrison, would be an easy target. Despite his confidence the Allies were forewarned of the plan and had already reinforced Brussels' garrison.

Maximilian, expecting a swift victory, faced strong resistance from Colonel Pascale, the governor of Brussels, and his well-prepared garrison. Despite his demands for surrender, Pascale defiantly refused. Maximilian's plan quickly unraveled, and what he thought would be a quick assault turned into a protracted and bloody struggle. The inhabitants of Brussels did not rally to Maximilian's cause as he had hoped and his attempt to take Brussels by force failed.

== Prelude ==
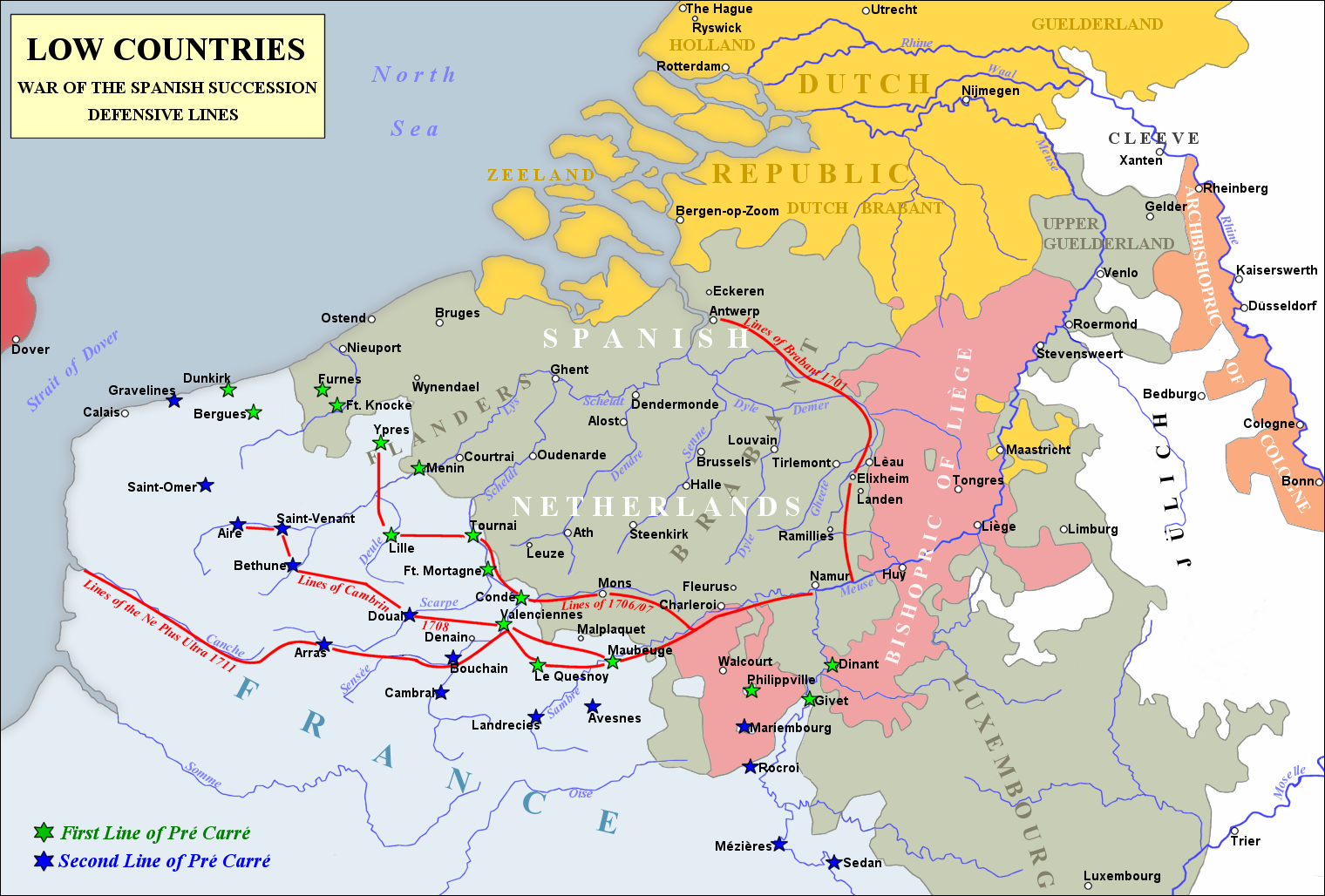
Campaign map of the Low Countries during the War of the Spanish Succession

Following the Battle of Ramillies in 1706, where the Allies severely defeated a Bourbon Franco-Spanish army, much of the Spanish Netherlands fell into Allied hands. The Allied commander, the Duke of Marlborough, remarked that it was "very astonishing that the enemy should give up a whole country with so many strong places without the least resistance." However, the Allied hold on these lands remained precarious. Most of the towns that surrendered to the Allies in the weeks following Ramillies hardly deserved the designation of "fortress." The major towns of Spanish Brabant and Flanders, in particular, had weak fortifications, stemming as much from lack of maintenance as from outdated designs. This was common knowledge even before the war, and French commanders had been complaining about the state of these newly acquired towns from the moment they occupied them in 1701. Well-fortified cities like Namur, Mons, Tournai, and Lille remained, however, out of Allied hands.

The 1707 campaign in the Low Countries was marked by a lack of any successes on either side. For the Allies, a major issue during this campaign was the severe limitation of their mobility, as they were forced to protect numerous vulnerable towns. This constraint significantly hampered their strategic operations. Lieutenant-General François Nicolas Fagel captured the sentiment among the Allies during the campaign, stating: "We don't have in all of Brabant a single town or place of which we can be assured [...] when our army is far from these places, they are in fear." By 1708, Marlborough's only viable solution was to abandon Brussels – a politically risky decision that greatly unsettled his Dutch allies. (Note: If Brussels would fall to the French the territory of the Dutch Republic itself would be exposed, and the connection with the Meuse would be severed. During the Nine Years' War King William III, despite facing similar predicaments as Marlborough, had never been willing to abandon Brussels, even after the defeat at the Battle of Landen in 1693. Similarly, Field Marshal Georg von Waldeck, had not retreated following the Battle of Fleurus. There were also fears that the Allies would lose prestige abroad and risk alienating the people in the Southern Netherlands who were well-disposed towards them.)

At the start of the 1708 campaign, the French, in a surprise attack, captured two of those weakly fortified major Flemish towns, Ghent and Bruges. The unexpected fall of these cities exposed the vulnerability of the Allied positions, strained relations between the British and Dutch, and fostered discontent among the local Flemish populations. It also destroyed Marlborough's plan to leave Brussels, because the city now became the only remaining link with Dutch territory. However, a major French defeat at the Battle of Oudenaarde placed the initiative again in Allied hands. After considerable debate, the Allies decided to besiege the strongly fortified city of Lille. However, Louis-François de Boufflers and his French garrison defended the city tenaciously, causing the siege to progress very slowly.

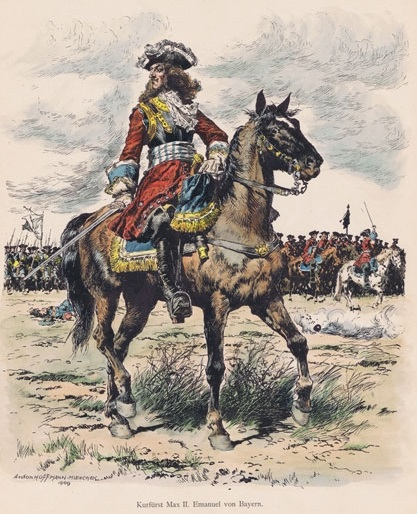
19th century image of Maximilian of Bavaria as a military commander, by Anton Hoffmann

In November, as the 1708 campaign entered its final phase, the French forces, led by Marshal Vendôme, shifted their focus towards Brussels, the key administrative and political center of the Spanish Netherlands. To lift the siege of Lille, Vendôme directed Maximilian of Bavaria, who had previously served as the governor of the Spanish Netherlands, to march on Brussels. Maximilian, who had propagated this attack on Brussel, anticipated an easy victory. He assumed support from the civilians in Brussels due to his prior popularity and the city's outdated fortifications. It was also believed that the Allied garrison was too weak to sustain an attack.

The city's capture was seen as a crucial strategic objective for the French because the loss of Brussels would have made it nearly impossible for the Allies to repair and resupply Lille, whose fortifications had been severely damaged during the siege. Additionally, the supply depots in Menen, Kortrijk, and Oudenaarde were nearly depleted, meaning that at the start of the following year, all of these strongholds could have been easily recaptured by the French.

Marlborough's Secret Service however informed him of this plan almost as soon as it was conceived. When Maximilian marched on Brussels with 15,000 mostly French troops Marlborough had thus already reinforced the garrison of Brussels. While it was still true that François de Pascale, the governor of Brussels, commanded a garrison of only 6,000 troops – too few to sustain a prolonged siege – these troops were strong enough to repel a direct assault on the city. The morale of the garrison was particularly high, as the Dutch deputies Johan van den Bergh and Frederik Adriaan van Renswoude had ensured that the soldiers were well-paid and cared for. Of the nine battalions in the garrison, three were Dutch, two Imperial, one British, one Saxon, and two were from the Southern Netherlands itself. Pascale also had a regiment of dragoons from the Southern Netherlands and 400 Imperial hussars at his disposal.

== Assault ==
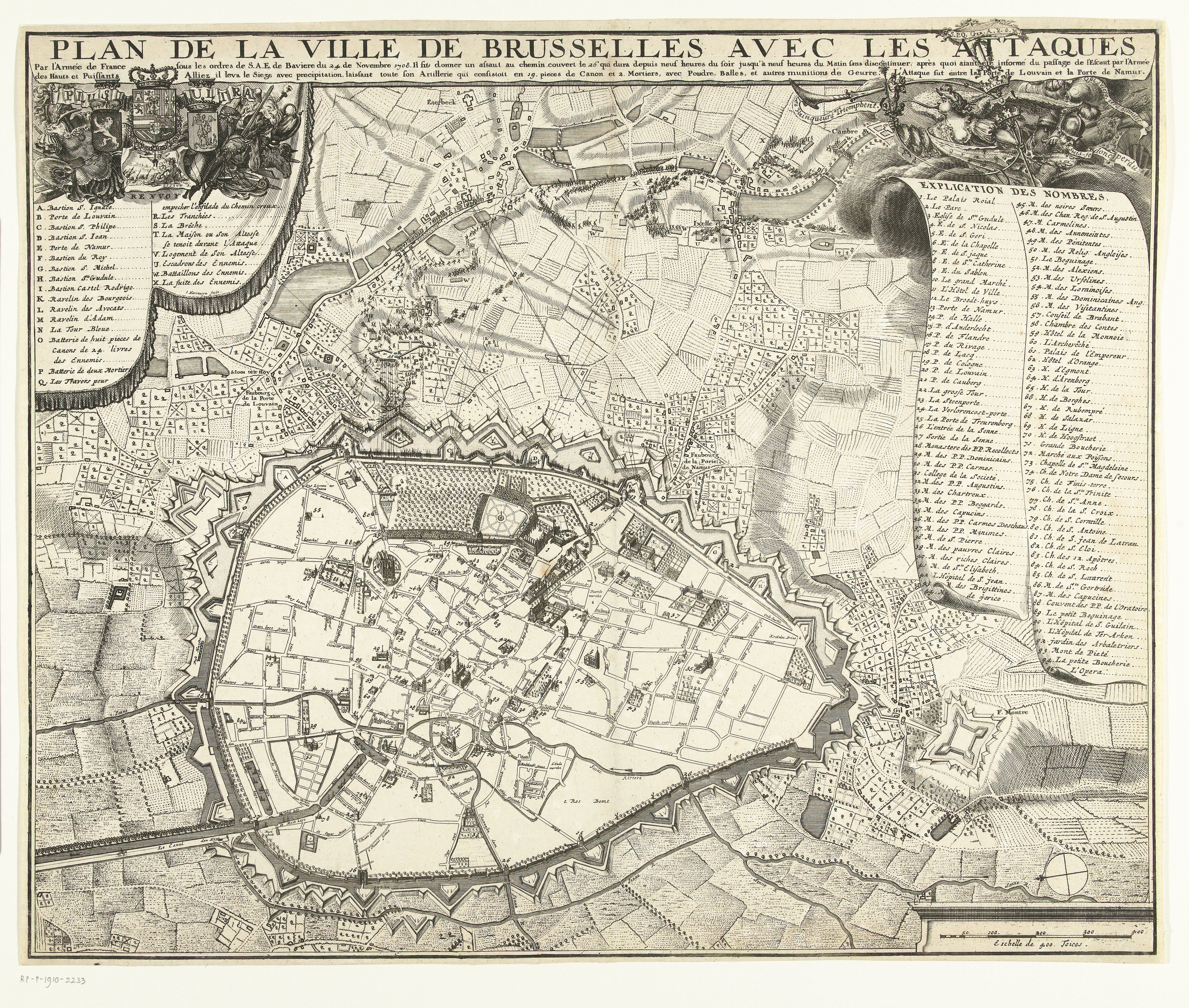
Contemporary map of the Attack on Brussels, by Jacobus Harrewijn.

With the Bavarian Jean Baptist, Comte d'Arco as his deputy commander, Maximilian appeared before Brussels on November 22. The Allies had taken strong measures to prevent any unrest among the citizens so when Maximilian summoned Governor Pascal to surrender the city, Pascal was able to resolutely reject this demand. Contrary to his expectations, Maximilian now had to bring in artillery from Mons, which would take several days. The night of November 24 to 25 was spent by the attackers opening trenches on the southeastern side of the city. In the early morning of November 26, they opened fire for the first time with 8 cannons and 4 mortars. However, the artillery fire from the city was so effective that the French guns were quickly silenced. In the evening, the French resumed their fire, this time in combination with a large infantry assault on the city.

After 20:00, a fierce assault began on the covertway when 6,000 French soldiers stormed the city. The fighting continued throughout the night, with the defenders, bolstered by numerous volunteers from the civilian population, repelling no fewer than nine attacks. The French forces advanced no further than the palisades. The next morning it was discovered that several French troops had taken shelter on the glacis during the night. By nine o'clock, Pascal decided to launch a counterattack. This sortie, led by Pascale at the head of his cavalry, was highly successful. Maximilian's troops were driven into a full retreat, and the Allies pushed forward to attack the attackers' artillery.

The following night, the defenders braced for a renewed assault or at the very least, a bombardment with heated shot to provoke a civilian uprising. Yet, to everyone's surprise, neither materialized. Instead, around midnight, it was discovered that the enemy had quietly withdrawn. Pascale, again at the head of the cavalry, initiated a pursuit. During this pursuit, it became clear that the Elector had hastily abandoned his wounded and nearly all his artillery, leaving behind 17 cannons and 2 mortars. The French had lost around 2,500 men in the assaults while the Allied lost around 400 men.

=== Crossing of the Scheldt ===
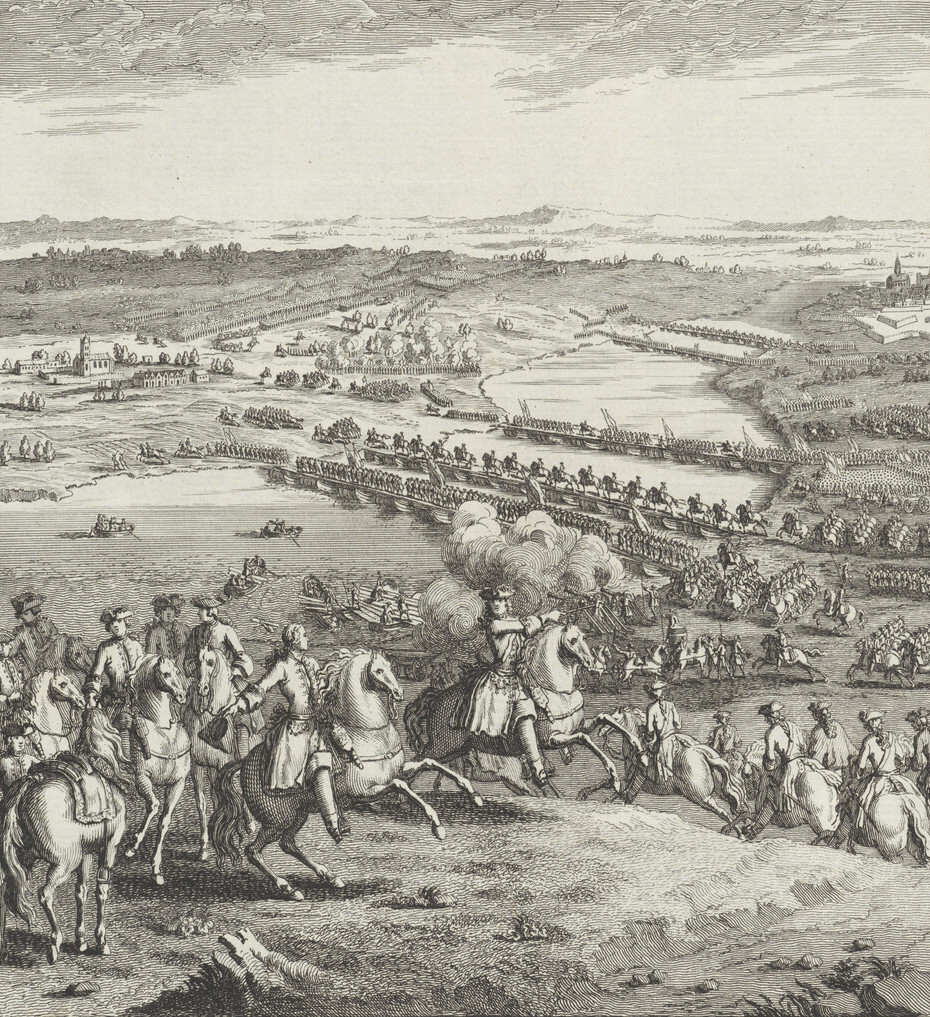
Illustration of the Crossing of the Scheldt

The reason for Maximilian's retreat must be understood in the context of events unfolding elsewhere. To cut off the Allied army near Lille from their supply lines, the French had established fortified positions along the Scheldt River. If Marlborough and Eugene of Savoy intended to relieve Brussels, they would have had to force their way across the Scheldt with their army.

On 26 November, Marlborough, bolstered by reinforcements from Prince Eugene, who had diverted as many troops as he could spare from the siege of Lille, advanced swiftly from Kortrijk. The Allies then forced the line of the Scheldt River at two key points: Kerkhoff and Gavere. The troops crossed the wide river using pontoon bridges, catching the French completely by surprise, which resulted in minimal resistance. In the ensuing confusion, the French retreated in disarray, pursued by Dutch cavalry under Lord Albemarle. The French suffered over 650 casualties, while the Allies sustained fewer than 200 losses.

By the afternoon of November 27th, the entire French army was forced to retreat from the fortifications along the Scheldt River. Some units withdrew to Ghent, while others fell back to Tournai. The position of the Elector of Bavaria in Brussels became immediately untenable and he escaped to Mons. During this time, the strategically important post of Saint-Ghislain, which had been stripped of its garrison to support the siege of Brussels, was captured by a surprise raid led by the governor of Ath. This forced the French to expend significant resources to reclaim it.

== Aftermath ==
Once it was confirmed that the Allied forces had successfully crossed the Scheldt, Prince Eugene swiftly returned to reinforce the siege around the citadel of Lille. This rapid and well-executed operation against the numerically superior French forces forced Vendôme to retreat in the vicinity of Douai, while he left the Count de la Mothe with a force to guard Ghent and Bruges. The fall of Lille's citadel now appeared inevitable. Marlborough's operation not only relieved Brussels but also reestablished the eastern supply line crucial for the besiegers of Lille and ensured the securement of winter quarters for his troops. The French army's morale took another significant blow during this campaign. Finally, on December 9th, the citadel of Lille surrendered. Marshal Boufflers, who had valiantly defended the city, was allowed to march out with honors, leading the remnants of his garrison back into France.

Although it was late in the year, and while the French had already gone into winter quarters, the Allies decided to continue their campaign following the successful siege of Lille. Marlborough and the Dutch deputies concluded that the capture of Ghent would be of great strategic value for ensuring the supply lines to Lille in the following year. On December 18th, the Allied forces under Marlborough advanced on Ghent. After a brief siege of 12 days, La Mothe surrendered the city, allowing his troops to leave with honors. Bruges surrendered soon after this.

With these actions, one of the longest and most eventful military campaigns of the era came to an end. Although the year had started poorly for the Allies with the French capture of Ghent and Bruges, the masterful generalship of Marlborough and Eugene, combined with the skillful management of supplies by the Dutch deputies, had reversed the situation. The French were defeated at Oudenaarde, Lille – one of the most important and strongest French cities – was captured, and Ghent and Bruges were reclaimed.

Although Vendôme's army was not decisively beaten and many strong fortresses were still in French hands, the Great Frost of 1709 brought further misery to the French. Additionally, the French treasury was severely depleted. Consequently, Louis XIV was prepared to make significant concessions in the negotiations that began in 1709. However, the Allies' heavy demands proved too great for Louis's pride, leading to the continuation of the war into the following year.

== Sources ==
- Churchill, Winston (1936). Marlborough: His Life and Times. George G. Harrap Co. Ltd London.
- Falkner, James (2007). Marlborough's sieges. Spellmount. ISBN 9781862273405.
- Van Lennep, Jacob (1880). "Negentiende hoofdstuk". De geschiedenis van Nederland, aan het Nederlandsche Volk verteld. Deel 3 [The history of the Netherlands, told to the Dutch nation. Vol. 3, ch. 19] (in Dutch). Leiden. pp. 265–275.
- Nimwegen, Olaf van (1995). De subsistentie van het leger: Logistiek en strategie van het Geallieerde en met name het Staatse leger tijdens de Spaanse Successieoorlog in de Nederlanden en het Heilige Roomse Rijk (1701-1712) [The subsistence of the Allied and especially the Dutch army during the War of the Spanish Succession] (Thesis) (in Dutch). Universiteit Utrecht.
- Ostwald, Jamel (2000). "The 'Decisive' Battle of Ramillies, 1706: Prerequisites for Decisiveness in Early Modern Warfare". History. 42 (3): 649–677. doi:10.2307/120864. JSTOR 120864.
- Ostwald, Jamel (2006). Vauban under Siege: Engineering Efficiency and Martial Vigor in the War of the Spanish Succession. Brill. ISBN 978-90-47-41150-5.
- Veenendaal, A J (1950). "The Opening Phase of Marlborough's Campaign of 1708 in the Netherlands: A Version from Dutch Sources". History. 35 (123/124): 34–48. doi:10.2307/120864. JSTOR 24402730.
- Veenendaal, A J (1970). Bromley, JS (ed.). The New Cambridge Modern History: Volume 6, The war of the Spanish succession in Europe. Cambridge University Press. ISBN 978-0-521-29396-9.
- Wijn, J.W. (1959). Het Staatsche Leger: Deel VIII-2 Het tijdperk van de Spaanse Successieoorlog (The Dutch States Army: Part VIII-2 The era of the War of the Spanish Succession) (in Dutch). Martinus Nijhoff.
