= Mérope =

1743 tragedy in five acts by Voltaire

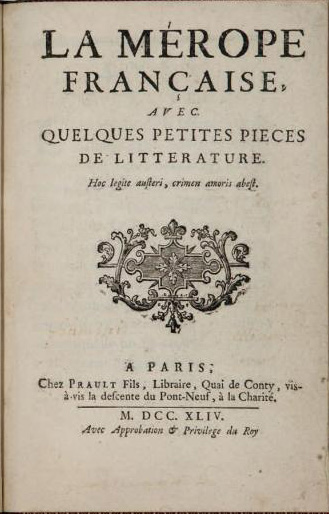
Voltaire Mérope 1744

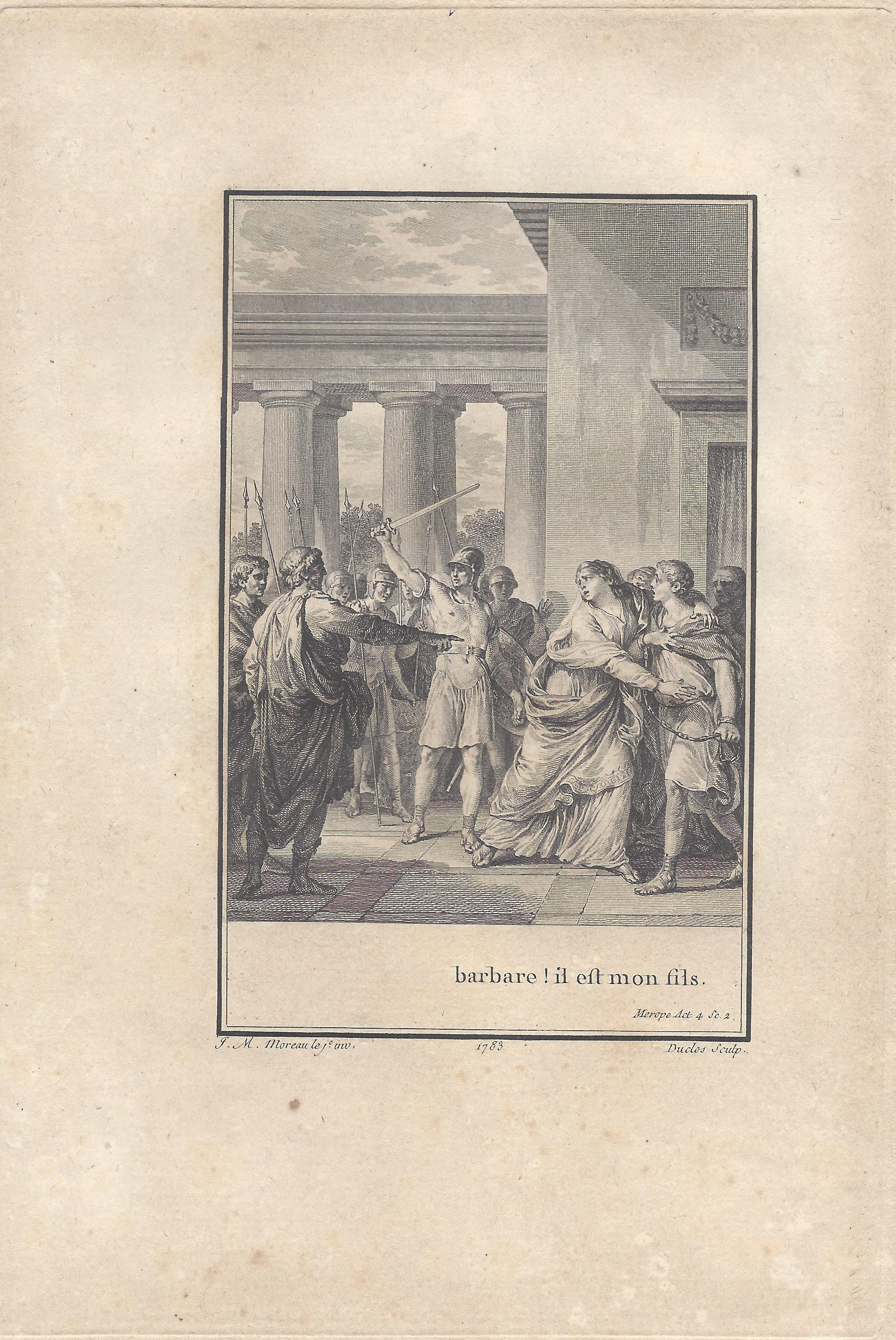
Jean-Michel Moreau: Illustration of Mérope 1783

Mérope (original French title: La Mérope Française) is a tragedy in five acts by Voltaire. The text is a reworking by Voltaire of the Italian tragedy Merope (1713) by Scipione Maffei, dating from 1736/1737. The play premiered in 1743 and first appeared in print in 1744.

== Background ==
Scipione Maffei worked the classical story into his tragedy Merope in 1713. Voltaire met Maffei in Paris in 1733 and secured his agreement that it should be adapted into a French tragedy. Voltaire decided to premiere it only after the staging of his tragedy Mahomet, although he had completed work on it in 1737.

== Action ==
The action takes place at the court of Messene. The queen dowager Merope, mourning her murdered husband Cresphonte regards the newcomer Egisthe as responsible for the murder of her son, when in fact he is her long-lost son. He presents himself at court and eventually deposes and kills the tyrannical usurper Polyphonte, who had killed his father. Egisthe then installs Mérope as queen.

== Performance and critical reception ==
The play was put on at the Comédie-Française. After the premiere the audience called Voltaire onto the stage in front of the curtain - the first time this had ever happened in the history of French theatre. With 29 subsequent performances the play was a great success. It was also a commercial success, with receipts exceeding those of any previous play by Voltaire. Merope was revived in February and March the following year, attracting even larger audiences.

== Printed editions ==
The first printed edition of the play was La Mérope Française, avec quelques petites pièces de Litterature, Paris, Chez Prault fils, Libraire, Quai de Conty, vis-à-vis la descente du Pont-Neuf, à la Charitè, M. DCC. XLIV, 8°, XXIV (II), 116 (II), 16 S.

When the play was printed Voltaire added a preface, Avis au lecteur, in which he warned against pirate editions, and a letter of dedication to Scipione Maffei. The subtitle Pièces fugitives de littérature indicated that a number of other works were published together with the tragedy: Lettre sur l'esprit, Nouvelles considérations sur l'histoire and Lettre à M. Norberg, chapelain du roy de Suède Charles XII, auteur de l`histoire de ce monarque.

Mérope was adapted into English by Aaron Hill, who also translated other works by Voltaire, Zara (Zaire) and Alzira (Alzire) for the London stage. Friedrich Wilhelm Gotter translated the play into German in 1774.
