= Johan Wijnand van Goor =

Dutch general

Johan Wijnand van Goor (Linnich c. 1650 – Donauwörth, 2 July 1704) was a Dutch general in the Nine Years' War and the War of Spanish Succession. He was the last Master-general of Artillery of the Dutch States Army (the successor of Menno van Coehoorn in that function). He distinguished himself at the attempted passage of the Lines of Stollhofen (1703) and the Battle of Schellenberg where he died commanding the first assault.

== Life ==
Little is known of Van Goor's personal life. He was the brother of Johan Herman van Goor, also a Dutch officer. He was twice married, first in 1684 to Johanna Elisabeth van Volbergen, and after she died in 1696, to Josina Philippina de Bette.

== Career ==
At the time of his first marriage in 1684 he was a lieutenant-colonel of a Walloon regiment in the States Army, according to the information in the marriage register of Grave. At the beginning of the Nine Years' War he was appointed Quarter-Master General of Waldeck's field army, still a lieutenant-colonel. He was present at the siege of Kaiserswerth and the Battle of Walcourt, where he probably first met the future Duke of Marlborough. In 1690, now formally in English service, he commanded the artillery of William III's army at the Battle of the Boyne. In 1691, still in English service, he went to Flanders as a colonel of artillery in the British Corps with Marlborough. In 1694 he was Colonel of the train of the English artillery.

After the Nine Years' War he returned to Dutch service. In 1702 he was appointed governor of the fortress of Maastricht. As such he commanded a number of raids in the early stages of the War of Spanish Succession against the French troops that occupied the Spanish Netherlands, among which an attempt on the Chateau de Horion, an expedition to Liège, and a failed attempt to surprise the fortress of Huy.

In 1701 he was promoted to major-general.

In 1703 the French threatened the Holy Roman Empire and the States General decided to send a detachment of 15 battalions under Van Goor to Louis William of Baden, the Imperial commander, as reinforcement. This force was assigned the left wing of the forces defending the Lines of Stollhofen, a series of fieldworks near Bühl. In April, 1703 a French army under Marshal Villars made several attempts to breach this barrier, but mainly thanks to Van Goor this attempt failed.

Villars next marched to the Danube via a different route and Baden requested Van Goor's support in opposing the French advance. The Dutch force joined Baden's army in July 1703 and took part in the fruitless maneuvering that followed. This frustrated Van Goor to such an extent that he had a falling out with Baden and was arrested for insubordination. The States General, however, brought about his release.

In early 1704 he was formally appointed Master-general of the Artillery of the States Army, with the rank of lieutenant-general, as successor of Menno van Coehoorn.

Van Goor's return to the Netherlands was now expected, but the Dutch Grand Pensionary Anthonie Heinsius prevented this in view of the planned Danube campaign of Marlborough. When Marlborough marched to the South, Van Goor joined him with first three battalions, that were later reinforced with the other twelve battalions that were still with Baden. As they were old acquaintances from the Flanders campaign of 1691 Van Goor soon gained Marlborough's confidence.

During the Battle of Schellenberg Van Goor was put in charge of the first assault wave. During the assault a musket ball pierced his eye and he fell dead off his horse. After the battle he was buried in the church of Nördlingen.

To illustrate the high regard both Marlborough and Prince Eugene of Savoy had for him, the following quote from Eugene is given:

'Le Général Goor qui a été tué a cette affaire, était une espèce d'homme qui régloit sa (i.e. Marlborough's!) conduite, et c'est une grande perte dans cette conjoncture, étant un homme de beaucoup de bravour, de capacité et qui, selon ce qu'on dit, est cause qu'on a attaqué'ce soir, étant très sur, que si l'on attendait au lendemain, comme la plus part voulait, l'on aurait perdu la moité de l'infanterie sans réussir. Je m'apercus de la mort de cet homme, voyant Mylord, selon les nouvelles que j'ai, assez incertain dans ses résolution.

== Sources ==
- (in Dutch) Het staatsche leger, 1568–1795, bewerkt door F.J.G. ten Raa en F. de Bas (J.W. Wijn) Eight vols. Breda, 1910–1950
