= Neuhaus an der Pegnitz =

Neuhaus a.d.Pegnitz
- Municipality
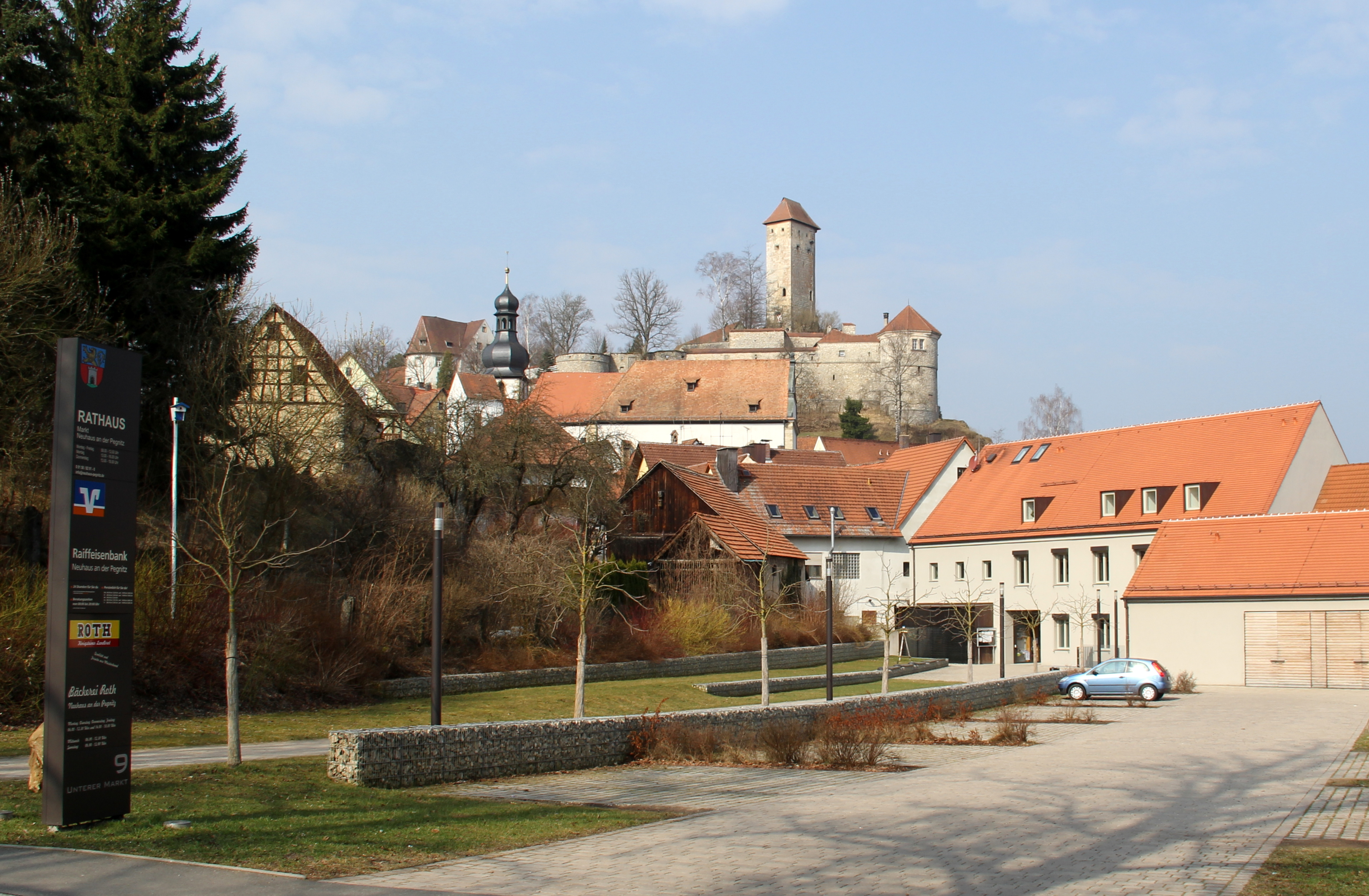
- Neuhaus with Veldenstein Castle

- Coat of arms

- Location of Neuhaus a.d.Pegnitz within Nürnberger Land district
- Interactive map of Neuhaus a.d.Pegnitz
- Location within Germany Location within Bavaria
- Coordinates: 49°37′N 11°33′E
- Country: Germany
- State: Bavaria
- Admin. region: Mittelfranken
- District: Nürnberger Land
- Subdivisions: 15 Ortsteile

Government
  - Mayor (2020–26): Josef Springer (CSU)

Area
  - Total: 23.31 km^{2} (9.00 sq mi)
- Elevation: 395 m (1,296 ft)

Population (2025-12-31)
  - Total: 2,652
  - Density: 113.8/km^{2} (294.7/sq mi)
- Time zone: UTC+01:00 (CET)
  - Summer (DST): UTC+02:00 (CEST)
- Postal codes: 91284
- Dialling codes: 09156
- Vehicle registration: LAU, ESB, HEB, N, PEG
- Website: www.neuhaus-pegnitz.de

Neuhaus an der Pegnitz (German pronunciation: [ˈnɔʏhaʊs ʔan deːɐ̯ ˈpeːɡnɪts], lit. 'Neuhaus on the Pegnitz') is a municipality in the district of Nürnberger Land in Bavaria in Germany.
