= Alessandro Maffei =

Italian field marshal lieutenant

Alessandro Ferdinando Maffei
- Alessandro Scipione
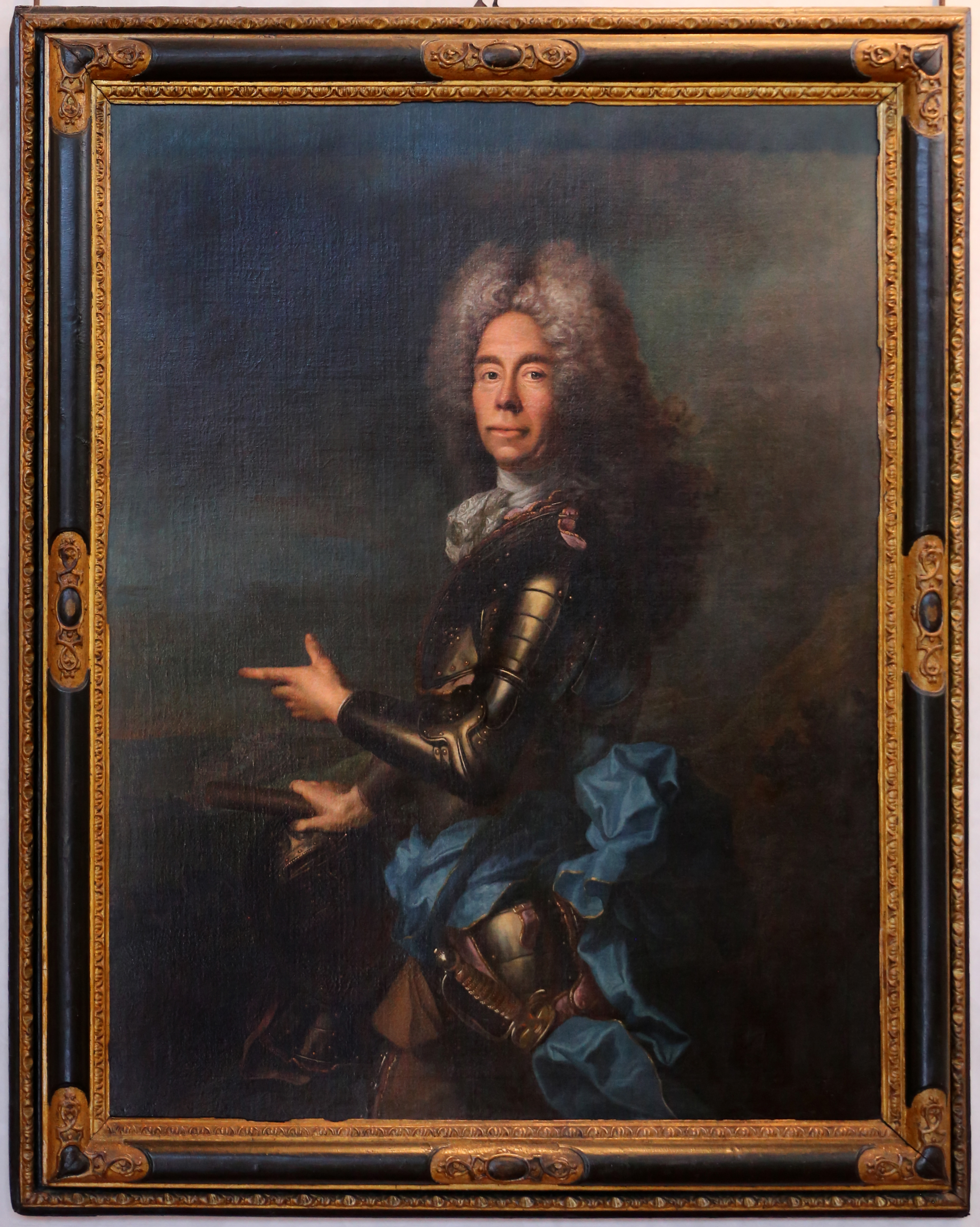
- Portrait of Maffei by Joseph Vivien
- Born: October 3, 1662; Verona, Republic of Venice
- Died: January 1, 1730 (aged 67); Munich, Duchy of Bavaria, Holy Roman Empire
- Relatives: Francesco Scipione Maffei (brother)
- Military career
- Allegiance: Holy Roman Empire; Electorate of Bavaria
- Branch: Bavarian Army
- Service years: 1683–1730
- Rank: Lieutenant Field Marshal
- Conflicts: Great Turkish War; Battle of Vienna; Battle of Párkány; Siege of Esztergom (1685); Siege of Érsekújvár (1685); Siege of Buda (1686); Battle of Mohács (1687); Siege of Belgrade (1688); Battle of Slankamen; Nine Years' War; Siege of Namur (1695); Battle of Krottensee; War of the Spanish Succession; First Battle of Höchstädt; Battle of Ramillies; Battle of Schellenberg; Battle of Blenheim; Austro-Turkish War (1716–1718); Siege of Belgrade (1717)

Alessandro Ferdinando Maffei (3 October 1662, Verona – 1 January 1730, Munich) was an Italian Lieutenant General of Infantry in the service of the Electorate of Bavaria. He was the brother of the Italian writer and archaeologist Francesco Scipione.

De Maffei was born at Verona. After entering the army of Bavaria in 1683 he was wounded at the Siege of Mongatz in 1687; he was later promoted to Colonel in 1696.

During the War of the Spanish Succession he served as the second in command at the Battle of Schellenberg in 1704. In 1706 he led a brigade at the Battle of Ramillies against the Allied forces under the command of the Duke of Marlborough. After being taken prisoner, he became involved in abortive negotiations for peace.

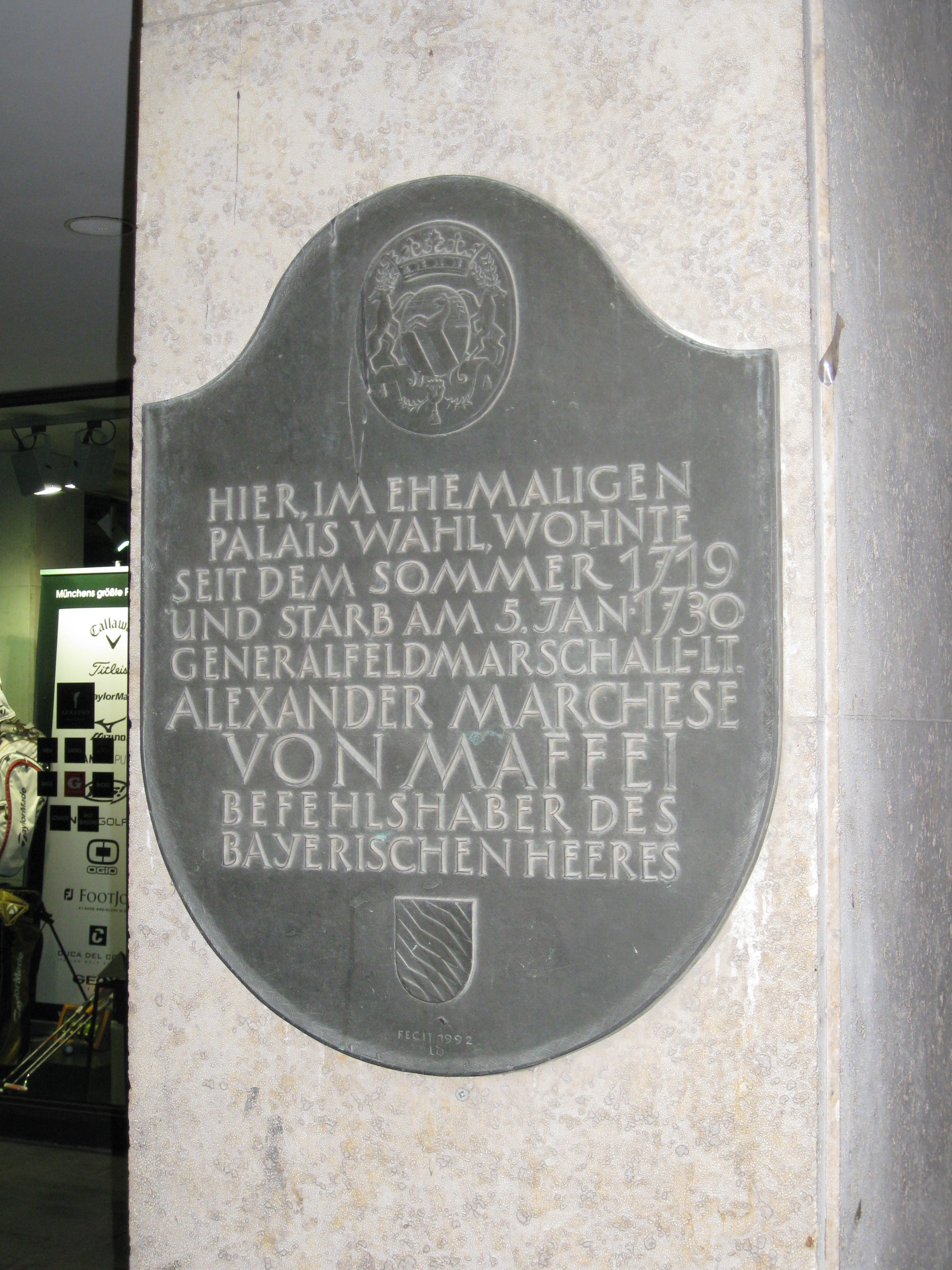
Plaques commemorating the house in Munich where Alessandro Maffei died.

In 1717 he contributed to the victory over the Turks at the Siege of Belgrade in the Austro-Turkish War and was subsequently made Field Marshal Lieutenant of the Holy Roman Empire. He died in Munich in 1730.

== Works ==
- Maffei, A. (1740). Memoires: Contenant une exacte description de plusieurs des plus fameuses Expeditions militaires de notre Siécle. 1. Memoires: Contenant Une exacte Description de plusieurs des plus fameuses Expeditions militaires de notre Siécle (in French). Neaulme.
