= Jean Baptist, Comte d'Arco =

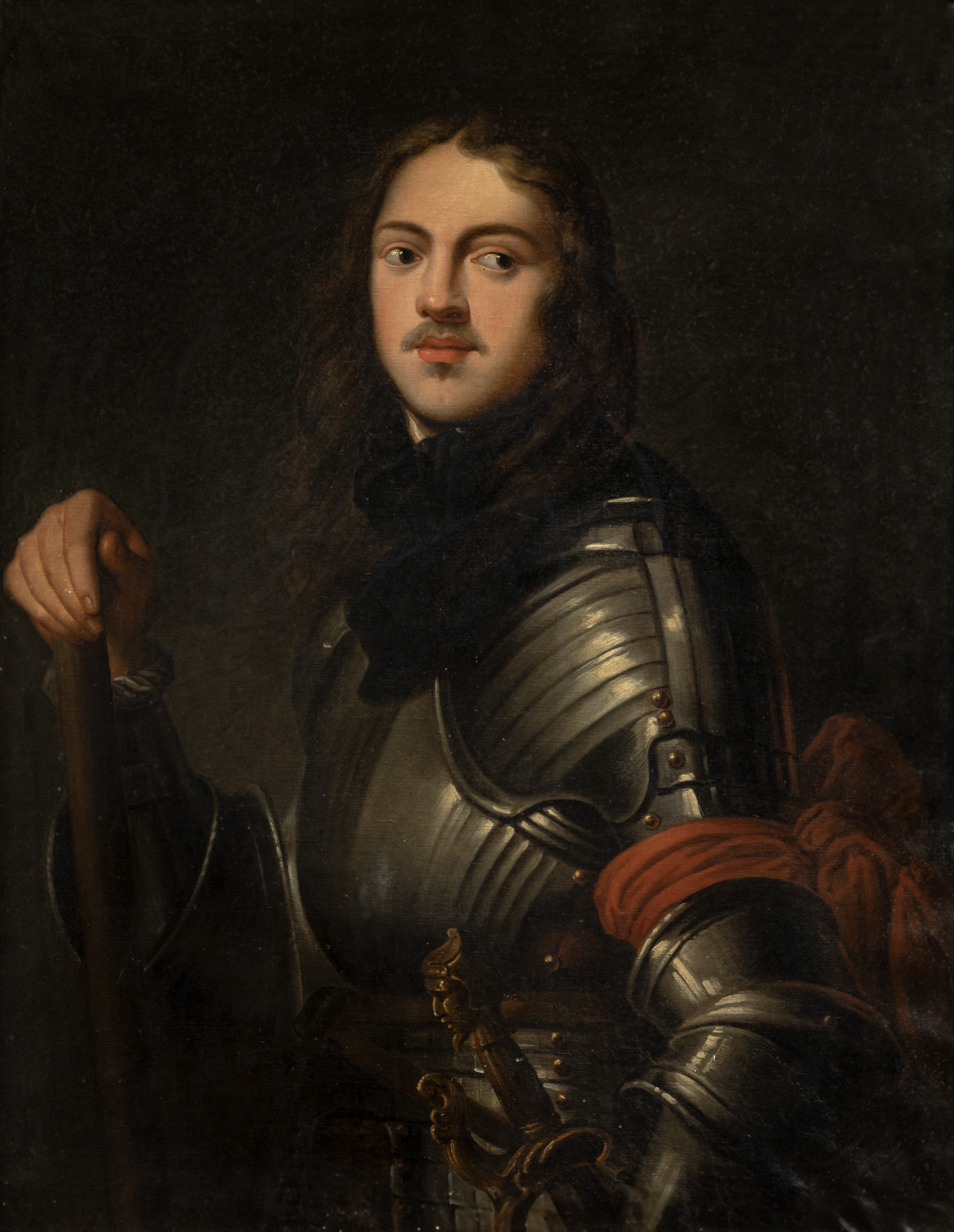
- Born: 1650
- Died: 21 March 1715 (aged 64–65); Munich, modern-day Germany
- Military career
- Allegiance: Habsburg monarchy Electorate of Bavaria
- Branch: Cavalry
- Service years: 1675–1683 (Habsburgs); 1672–1675, 1683–1706 (Bavaria)
- Rank: Generalfeldmarschall
- Conflicts: Great Turkish War; Battle of Vienna (1683); Siege of Belgrade (1688); Nine Years' War; Battle of Landen (1693); War of the Spanish Succession; First Battle of Höchstädt (1703); Battle of Schellenberg (1704); Battle of Blenheim (1704); Battle of Ramillies (1706); Assault on Brussels (1708)
- Other work: Diplomatic Emissary to England

Generalfeldmarschall Jean Baptist, Comte d'Arco (born Johann Baptist; c. 1650 – 21 March 1715) was a German military officer, diplomat nobleman who served in the Bavarian Army and the Imperial Army during the Great Turkish War and the War of the Spanish Succession.

== Family ==
Jean Baptist was born as the son of the Imperial Generalfeldzeugmeister (master-general of the ordnance) Prosper, Graf von Arco (Note: Arco, Trentino, was an Imperial fief.) and his wife Ursula Franzelina von Ketteler. In 1680, he married Ursula von Berndorff.

== Soldier ==
By 1672 he had entered the Bavarian army, but only three years later changed to Imperial service with his father, then in disgrace at court. In 1683, he was again in the Bavarian service as colonel of a regiment of cuirassiers. He gained military renown through his service in 1683 in the Imperial-Polish army of relief that fought the Battle of Vienna, and at the recovery of Belgrade in 1688. In 1696 he was named President of the Hofkriegsrat (war council) by Maximilian II Emanuel, Elector of Bavaria.

Upon the outbreak of the War of the Spanish Succession, he was recalled to the field, and promoted field marshal in 1702. While the Elector sought to hold off the Imperial troops in eastern Bavaria, d'Arco took command in Swabia to act in coordination with the French. Sent with a strong detachment of the Franco-Bavarian army to hold the fortified town of Donauwörth, he was attacked by Allied troops under the John Churchill, 1st Duke of Marlborough and the Louis William, Margrave of Baden-Baden. In the Battle of Schellenberg on 2 July 1704, the Allies carried the position after a series of bloody assaults, virtually destroying d'Arco's army in the ensuing pursuit. D'Arco had been cut off from most of his command during the battle, and survived to rejoin the main Franco-Bavarian army.

At the Battle of Blenheim, d'Arco, in command of the Bavarian cavalry, gallantly resisted the attacks of Prince Eugene of Savoy, but was forced to retreat with the remains of the left wing after Marlborough's attack destroyed the French on the right. He followed the Elector of Bavaria to the Netherlands and had another cavalry command at the Battle of Ramillies on 23 May 1706. After that battle, he returned to Bavaria.

== Diplomat ==
Count d'Arco was among the most important Bavarian advocates of a pro-French policy and, for that reason, was honored with the title of Marshal of France. He was afterwards sent on several diplomatic missions to England. He died in 1715 in Munich.
