= Siege of Landau =

The siege of Landau may refer to any of several sieges of the fortress city of Landau, located in Rhineland-Palatinate, Germany:

- Siege of Landau (1702), during the War of the Spanish Succession
- Siege of Landau (1703), during the War of the Spanish Succession
- Siege of Landau (1704), during the War of the Spanish Succession
- Siege of Landau (1713), during the War of the Spanish Succession
- Siege of Landau (1793), during the French Revolutionary Wars
