= Battle of Blenheim =

1704 battle of the War of the Spanish Succession

- Part of the War of the Spanish Succession
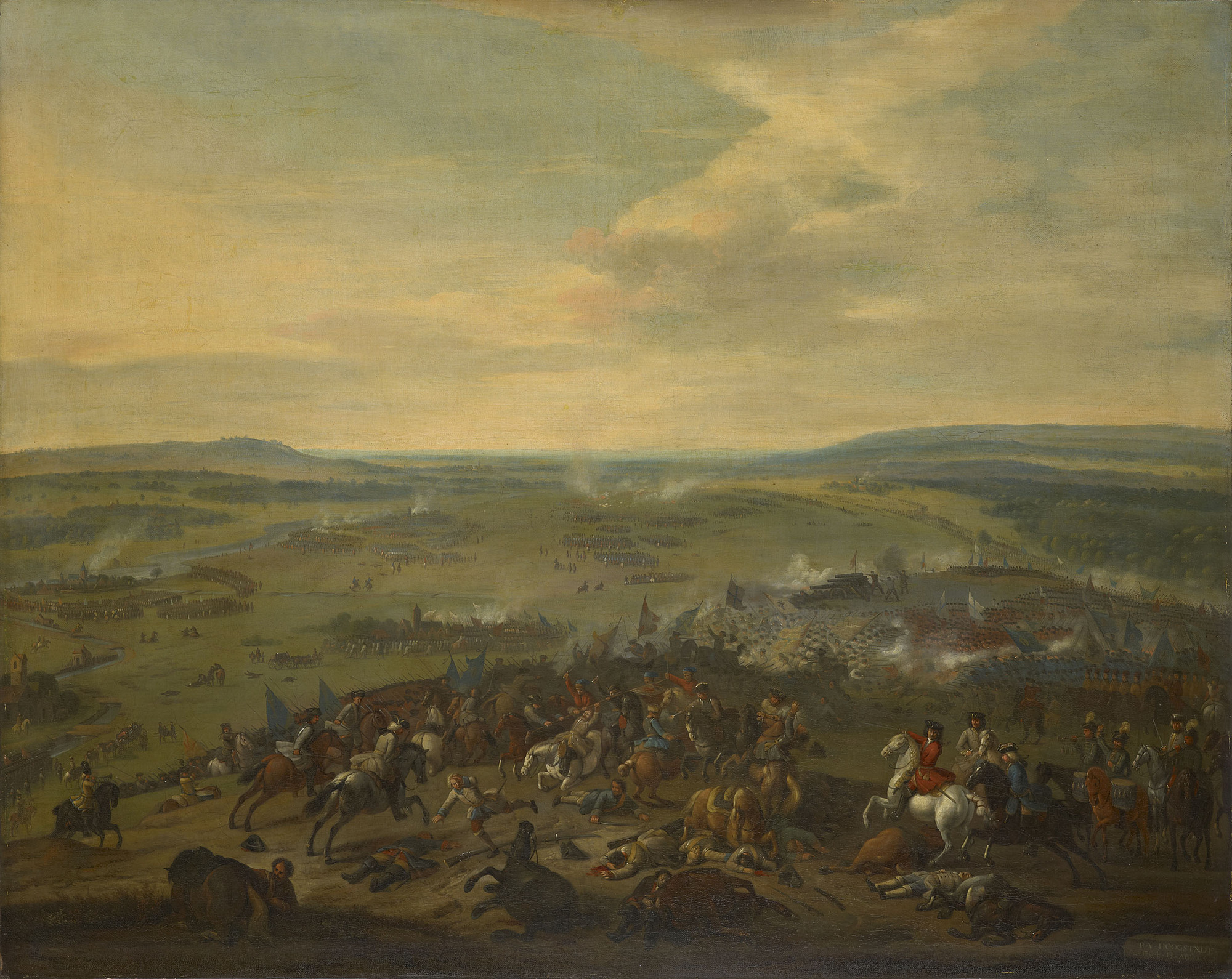
- c. 1720–1730 painting of the battle
Date	13 August [O.S. 2 August] 1704
Location	Blindheim, (Note: The village of Blindheim (Blenheim in English) lies on the Danube River, 16 km (10 mi) southwest of Donauwörth in Bavaria, southern Germany.) Höchstädt, Bavaria 48°38′42″N 10°36′0″E
Result	Grand Alliance victory

Belligerents
England; Holy Roman Empire; Dutch Republic; Scotland	France; Bavaria

Commanders and leaders
Duke of Marlborough; Eugene of Savoy	Duke of Tallard (surrendered); Ferdinand de Marsin; Maximilian II Emanuel

Strength
52,000; 66 guns	56,000; 90 guns

Casualties and losses
4,542 killed; 7,942 wounded; 500 captured	6,000 killed or drowned; 7,000 wounded; 14,190 captured
- Location within Germany Battle of Blenheim (Europe)

The Battle of Blenheim (German: Zweite Schlacht bei Höchstädt; French: Bataille de Höchstädt; Dutch: Slag bij Blenheim) fought on 13 August [O.S. 2 August] 1704, was a major battle of the War of the Spanish Succession. The overwhelming Allied victory ensured the safety of Vienna from the Franco-Bavarian army, thus preventing the collapse of the reconstituted Grand Alliance.

Louis XIV of France sought to knock the Holy Roman Emperor, Leopold, out of the war by seizing Vienna, the Habsburg capital, and gain a favourable peace settlement. The dangers to Vienna were considerable: Maximilian II Emanuel and Marshal Ferdinand de Marsin's forces in Bavaria threatened from the west, and Marshal Louis Joseph, Duke of Vendôme's large army in northern Italy posed a serious danger with a potential offensive through the Brenner Pass. Vienna was also under pressure from Rákóczi's Hungarian revolt from its eastern approaches. Realising the danger, the Duke of Marlborough resolved to alleviate the peril to Vienna by marching his forces south from Bedburg to help maintain Emperor Leopold within the Grand Alliance.

A combination of deception and skilled administration – designed to conceal his true destination from friend and foe alike – enabled Marlborough to march 400 km (250 mi) unhindered from the Low Countries to the Danube in five weeks. After securing Donauwörth on the Danube, Marlborough sought to engage Maximilian's and Marsin's army before Marshal Camille d'Hostun, duc de Tallard could bring reinforcements through the Black Forest. The Franco-Bavarian commanders proved reluctant to fight until their numbers were deemed sufficient, and Marlborough failed in his attempts to force an engagement. When Tallard arrived to bolster Maximilian's army, and Prince Eugene of Savoy arrived with reinforcements for the Allies, the two armies finally met on the banks of the Danube in and around the small village of Blindheim, from which the English "Blenheim" is derived.

Blenheim was one of the battles that altered the course of the war, which until then was favouring the French and Spanish Bourbons. Although the battle did not win the war, it prevented a potentially devastating loss for the Grand Alliance and shifted the war's momentum, ending French plans of knocking Emperor Leopold out of the war. The French suffered catastrophic casualties in the battle, including their commander-in-chief, Tallard, who was taken captive to England. Before the 1704 campaign ended, the Allies had taken Landau, and the towns of Trier and Trarbach on the Moselle in preparation for the following year's campaign into France itself. This offensive never materialised, for the Grand Alliance's army had to depart the Moselle to defend Liège from a French counter-offensive. The war continued for another decade before ending in 1714.

== Background ==
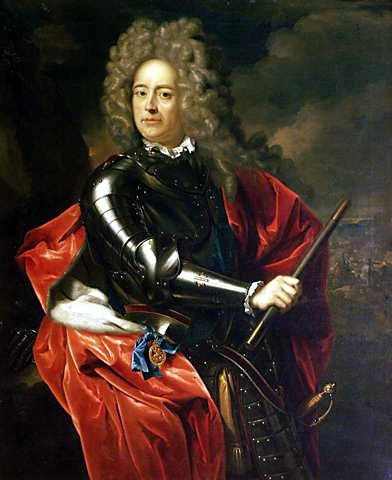
Portrait of the Duke of Marlborough by Adriaen van der Werff (December 1704) Uffizi

By 1704, the War of the Spanish Succession was in its fourth year. The previous year had been one of successes for France and her allies, most particularly on the Danube, where Marshal Claude-Louis-Hector de Villars and Maximilian II Emanuel, had created a direct threat to Vienna, the Habsburg capital. Vienna had been saved by dissension between the two commanders, leading to Villars being replaced by the less dynamic Marshal Ferdinand de Marsin. Nevertheless, the threat was still real: Rákóczi's Hungarian revolt was threatening the Empire's eastern approaches, and Marshal Louis Joseph, Duke of Vendôme's forces threatened an invasion from northern Italy. In the courts of Versailles and Madrid, Vienna's fall was confidently anticipated, an event which would almost certainly have led to the collapse of the reconstituted Grand Alliance.

To isolate the Danube from any Allied intervention, Marshal François de Neufville, duc de Villeroi's 46,000 troops were expected to pin the 70,000 Dutch and British troops around Maastricht in the Low Countries, while General Robert Jean Antoine de Franquetot de Coigny protected Alsace against surprise with a further corps. The only forces immediately available for Vienna's defense were the imperial army under Margrave Louis William of Baden of 36,000 men stationed in the Lines of Stollhofen to watch Marshal Camille d'Hostun, duc de Tallard, at Strasbourg; and 10,000 men under Prince Eugene of Savoy south of Ulm.

Various Allied statesmen and commanders, including the Imperial Austrian Ambassador in London, Count Wratislaw, Johan Wijnand van Goor and the Duke of Marlborough, apprehended the implications of the situation on the Danube. To maintain secrecy, the Allied leadership kept their plans hidden from both the Dutch States General and the Parliament of England. In the Dutch Republic, only a select few – Grand Pensionary Anthonie Heinsius, Simon van Slingelandt, Jacob Hop, and François Fagel – were involved in the decision to march to the Danube. In England, Marlborough confided only in Sidney Godolphin, Queen Anne, and Prince George, her husband. Marlborough, realising that the only way to reinforce the Austrians was by the use of secrecy and guile, pretended to move his troops to the Moselle – a plan approved by the Dutch States General – but having arrived there, he would move further and link up with Austrian forces in southern Germany. (Note: British historians have often argued that Marlborough kept his plans secret from the Dutch because he believed they would never allow him to weaken the army in the Low Countries. However, this is not entirely correct. Marlborough could not undertake any action without consultation with the Dutch, for without them the army's logistics system would have simply collapsed. Intensive consultations preceded the campaign, and the four most important Dutch politicians knew of the secret plan to link up with Austrian forces from the start.)

The Dutch diplomat and field deputy Van Rechteren-Almelo would come to play an important role. He made sure that on their 450-kilometre-long march, the Allies would nowhere be denied passage by local rulers, nor would they need to look for provisions, fodder for their horses or new boots. He also saw to it that enough stopovers were arranged along the way to ensure that the Allies reached their destination in good condition. This was of paramount importance, for the success of the operation depended on a quick elimination of the Bavarian elector. However, it was not possible to make the logistical arrangements in advance that would have been indispensable to supply the Allied army south of the Danube. For this, the Allies should have had access to the free imperial cities of Ulm and Augsburg, but the Bavarian elector had taken these two cities. This could have become a problem for Marlborough had the Elector avoided a battle and instead entrenched himself south of the Danube. Had Villeroy then managed to take advantage of the weakening of Allied forces in the Netherlands by recapturing Liège and besieging Maastricht, it would have validated the concerns of some of Marlborough's Dutch adversaries about his military abilities, like the Lord of Slangenburg, who considered Marlborough a lightweight.

== Prelude ==
=== Protagonists march to the Danube ===
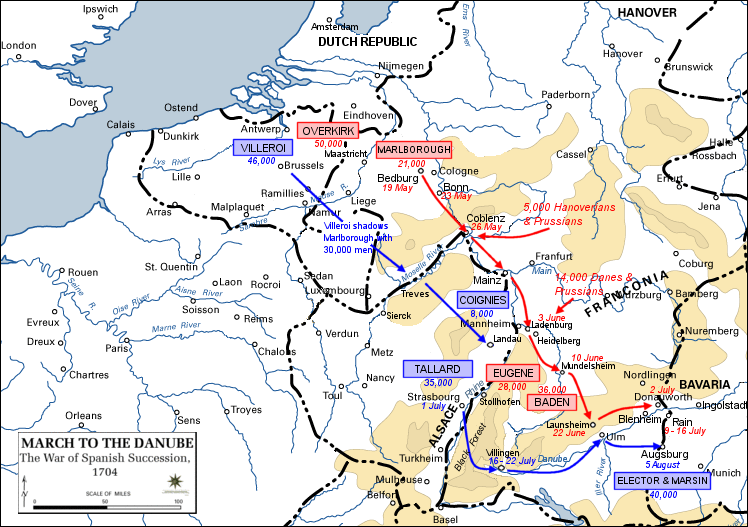
Map of the march to the Danube, May 1704 to August 1704

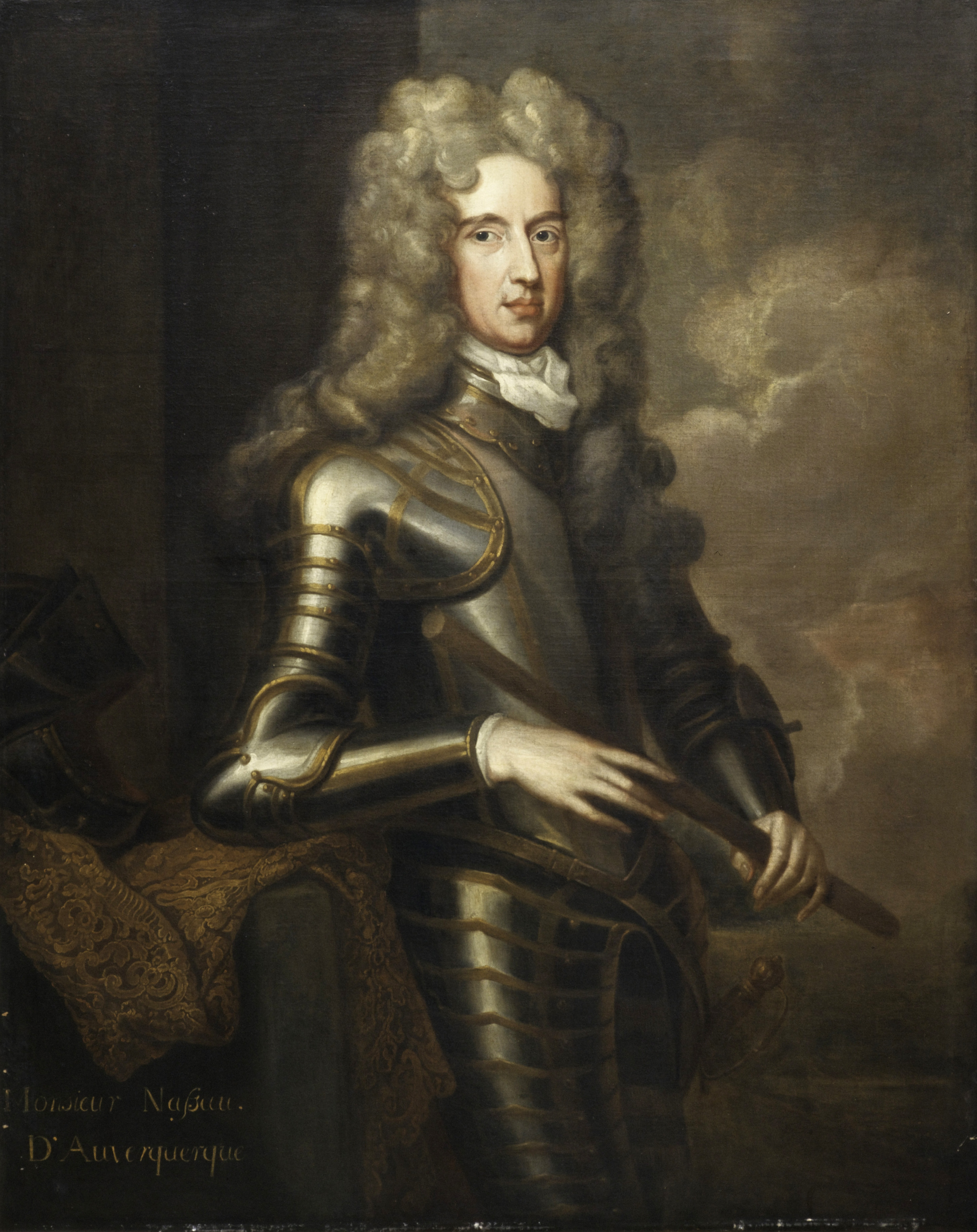
Henry de Nassau, Lord Overkirk, took control of Allied forces in the Netherlands

A scarlet caterpillar, upon which all eyes were at once fixed, began to crawl steadfastly day by day across the map of Europe, dragging the whole war with it. – Winston Churchill

Marlborough's march started on 19 May from Bedburg, 32 km (20 mi) northwest of Cologne. The army assembled by Marlborough's brother, General Charles Churchill, consisted of 66 squadrons of cavalry, 31 battalions of infantry and 38 guns and mortars, totalling 21,000 men, 16,000 of whom were British. (Note: The initial force of 21,000 men were accompanied by 1,700 supply carts drawn by 5,000 draught horses. The artillery needed as many more.) This force was augmented en route, and by the time it reached the Danube it numbered 40,000 – 47 battalions and 88 squadrons. While Marlborough led this army south, the Dutch general, Henry Overkirk, Count of Nassau, maintained a defensive position in the Dutch Republic against the possibility of Villeroi mounting an attack. Marlborough had assured the Dutch that if the French were to launch an offensive he would return in good time, but he calculated that as he marched south, the French army would be drawn after him. In this assumption Marlborough proved correct: Villeroi shadowed him with 30,000 men in 60 squadrons and 42 battalions. (Note: Barnett and Coxe states 45 squadrons and 36 battalions.) Marlborough wrote to Godolphin: "I am very sensible that I take a great deal upon me, but should I act otherwise, the Empire would be undone ..."

With Marlborough gone, the Dutch States General had been finally forced to make a decision about who would replace the Earl of Athlone as head of the Dutch States Army. The appointment of Overkirk as Field Marshal provoked strong protests from senior officers such as Ernst Wilhelm von Salisch, Daniël van Dopff and Menno van Coehoorn, who even threatened to resign before being persuaded to remain. The new infantry generals were also displeased: the Lord of Slangenburg resented serving under the less experienced Overkirk, while the Count of Noyelles refused to take orders from the "insupportable" Slangenburg. A further dispute arose over the position of the Prince of Orange. The provinces of Friesland and Groningen demanded that their seventeen-year-old stadtholder be made commander of the infantry, dividing the provinces so deeply that a second Grand Assembly was even discussed. Eventually, under pressure, a compromise was reached: the prince was nominally appointed infantry general after Slangenburg and Noyelles, but would not take active command until the age of twenty.

While the Allies were making their preparations, the French were striving to maintain and re-supply Marsin. He had been operating with Maximilian II against Margrave Louis William, and was somewhat isolated from France: his only lines of communication lay through the rocky passes of the Black Forest. On 14 May, Tallard brought 8,000 reinforcements and vast supplies and munitions through the difficult terrain, whilst outmaneuvering Johann Karl von Thüngen, the Imperial general who sought to block his path. Tallard then returned with his own force to the Rhine, once again side-stepping Thüngen's efforts to intercept him. (Note: Chandler, p. 131, states that many men were lost on the return journey through desertion.)

On 26 May, Marlborough reached Coblenz, where the Moselle meets the Rhine. If he intended an attack along the Moselle his army would now have to turn west; instead it crossed to the right bank of the Rhine, and was reinforced by 5,000 waiting Hanoverians and Prussians. The French realised that there would be no campaign on the Moselle. A second possible objective now occurred to them: an Allied incursion into Alsace and an attack on Strasbourg. Marlborough furthered this apprehension by constructing bridges across the Rhine at Philippsburg—a ruse that not only encouraged Villeroi to come to Tallard's aid in the defense of Alsace, but one that ensured the French plan to march on Vienna was delayed while they waited to see what Marlborough's army would do.

Encouraged by Marlborough's promise to return to the Netherlands if a French attack developed there, transferring his troops up the Rhine on barges at a rate of 130 km (80 mi) a day, the Dutch States General agreed to release the Danish contingent of seven battalions and 22 squadrons as reinforcements. Marlborough reached Ladenburg, in the plain of the Neckar and the Rhine, and there halted for three days to rest his cavalry and allow the guns and infantry to close up. On 6 June he arrived at Wiesloch, south of Heidelberg. The following day, the Allied army swung away from the Rhine towards the hills of the Swabian Jura and the Danube beyond. At last Marlborough's destination was established without doubt.

=== Strategy ===
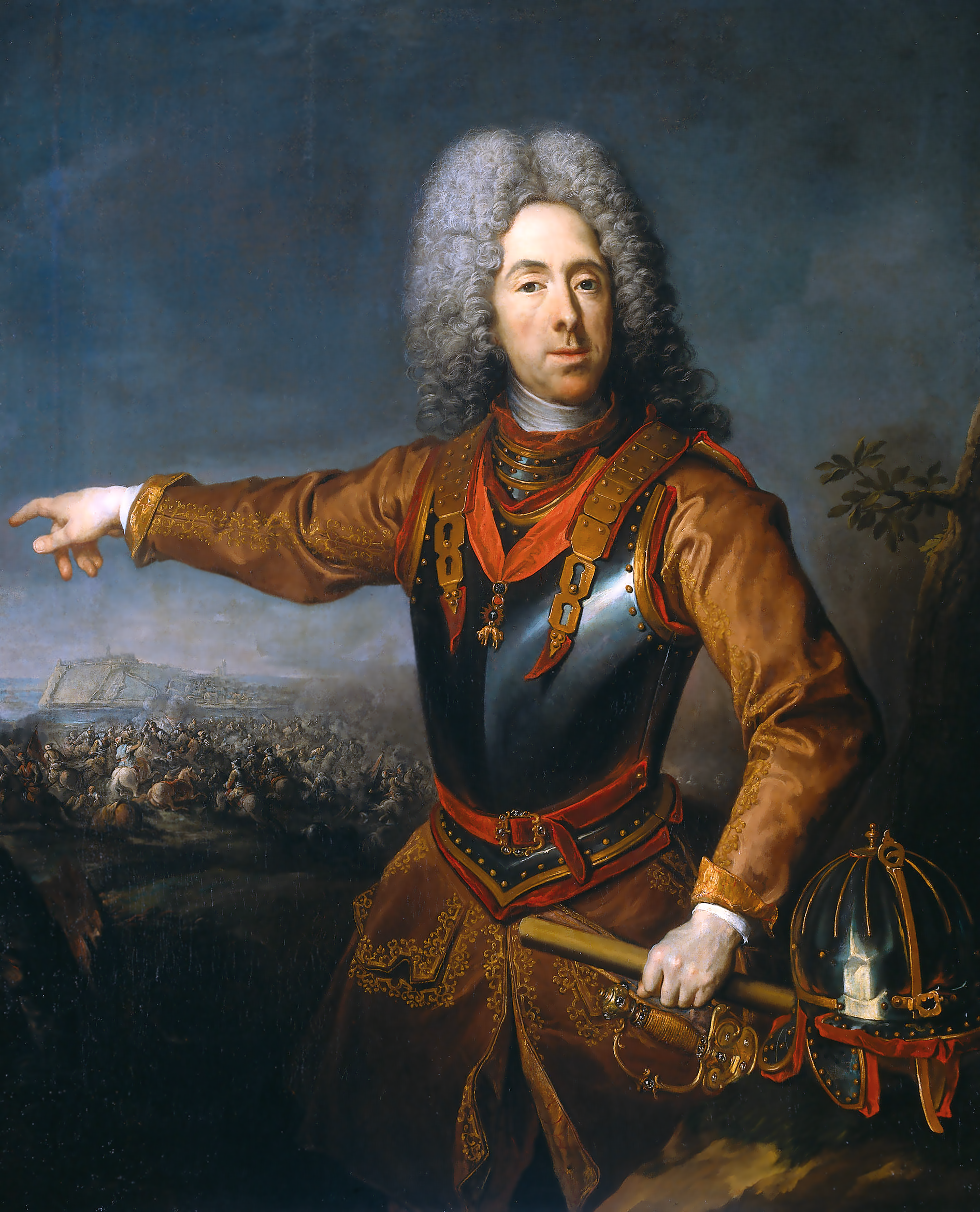
Prince Eugene of Savoy (pictured) met Marlborough for the first time in 1704. It was the start of a lifelong personal and professional friendship.

On 10 June, Marlborough met for the first time the President of the Imperial War Council, Prince Eugene – accompanied by Count Wratislaw – at the village of Mundelsheim, halfway between the Danube and the Rhine. By 13 June, the Imperial Field Commander, Margrave Louis William of Baden, had joined them in Großheppach. (Note: Prince Eugene had doubts about the reliability of Margrave Louis William, for he was a close friend of Maximilian. It was even suspected that Margrave Louis William was secretly corresponding with his old comrade.) The three generals commanded a force of nearly 110,000 men. At this conference, it was decided that Prince Eugene would return with 28,000 men to the Lines of Stollhofen on the Rhine to watch Villeroi and Tallard and prevent them going to the aid of the Franco-Bavarian army on the Danube. Meanwhile, Marlborough's and Margrave Louis William's forces would combine, totalling 80,000 men, and march on the Danube to seek out Maximilian II and Marsin before they could be reinforced.

Knowing Marlborough's destination, Tallard and Villeroi met at Landau in the Palatinate on 13 June to construct a plan to save Bavaria. The rigidity of the French command system was such that any variations from the original plan had to be sanctioned by Versailles. The Count of Mérode-Westerloo, commander of the Flemish troops in Tallard's army, wrote "One thing is certain: we delayed our march from Alsace for far too long and quite inexplicably." Approval from King Louis arrived on 27 June: Tallard was to reinforce Marsin and Maximilian II on the Danube via the Black Forest, with 40 battalions and 50 squadrons; Villeroi was to pin down the Allies defending the Lines of Stollhofen, or, if the Allies should move all their forces to the Danube, he was to join with Tallard; Coigny with 8,000 men would protect Alsace. On 1 July Tallard's army of 35,000 re-crossed the Rhine at Kehl and began its march.

On 22 June, Marlborough's forces linked up with the Imperial forces at Launsheim, having covered 400 km (250 mi) in five weeks. (Note: Lynn (2013, p. 290) states that the march-rate was not unprecedented for the period, averaging 12 km (7 1/2 mi) per day. What stands out was the total distance covered and the fine condition of the troops when they arrived.) Thanks to a carefully planned timetable, the effects of wear and tear had been kept to a minimum. Captain Parker described the march discipline: "As we marched through the country of our Allies, commissars were appointed to furnish us with all manner of necessaries for man and horse ... the soldiers had nothing to do but pitch their tents, boil kettles and lie down to rest." (Note: The Allied march was not without loss; some 900 men were lost to desertion or sickness, though this figure was low considering the length and pace of the march over bad roads and in poor weather and many of the sick later rejoined the army.) In response to Marlborough's maneuvers, Maximilian and Marsin, conscious of their numerical disadvantage with only 40,000 men, moved their forces to the entrenched camp at Dillingen on the north bank of the Danube. Marlborough could not attack Dillingen because of a lack of siege guns – he had been unable to bring any from the Low Countries, and Margrave Louis William had failed to supply any, despite prior assurances that he would.

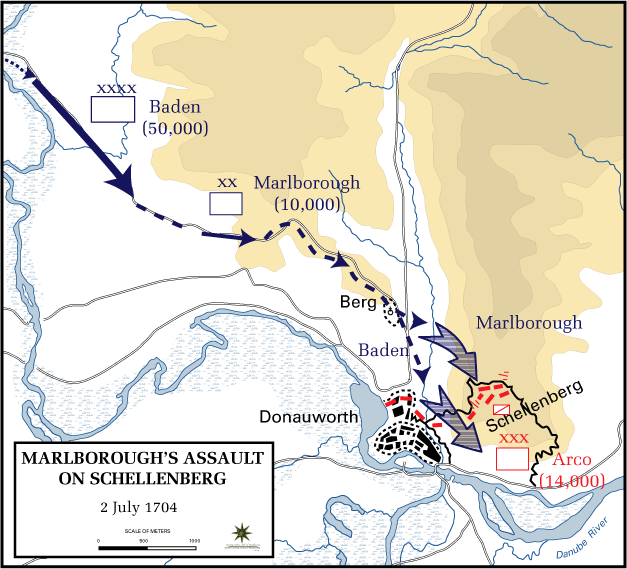
An Allied assault on the Schellenberg – taken by coup de main on 2 July – provided the Allies with an excellent river crossing.

The Allies needed a base for provisions and a good river crossing. Consequently, on 2 July Marlborough stormed the fortress of Schellenberg on the heights above the town of Donauwörth. Count Jean d'Arco had been sent with 12,000 men from the Franco-Bavarian camp to hold the town and grassy hill, but after a fierce battle, with heavy casualties on both sides, Schellenberg fell. This forced Donauwörth to surrender shortly afterward. Maximilian, knowing his position at Dillingen was now not tenable, took up a position behind the strong fortifications of Augsburg.

Tallard's march presented a dilemma for Prince Eugene. If the Allies were not to be outnumbered on the Danube, he realised that he had to either try to cut Tallard off before he could get there, or to reinforce Marlborough. If he withdrew from the Rhine to the Danube, Villeroi might also make a move south to link up with Maximilian and Marsin. Prince Eugene compromised – leaving 12,000 troops behind guarding the Lines of Stollhofen – he marched off with the rest of his army to forestall Tallard.

Lacking in numbers, Prince Eugene could not seriously disrupt Tallard's march but the French marshal's progress was proving slow. Tallard's force had suffered considerably more than Marlborough's troops on their march – many of his cavalry horses were suffering from glanders and the mountain passes were proving tough for the 2,000 wagonloads of provisions. Local German peasants, angry at French plundering, compounded Tallard's problems, leading Mérode-Westerloo to bemoan – "the enraged peasantry killed several thousand of our men before the army was clear of the Black Forest."

At Augsburg, Maximilian was informed on 14 July that Tallard was on his way through the Black Forest. This good news bolstered his policy of inaction, further encouraging him to wait for the reinforcements. This reticence to fight induced Marlborough to undertake a controversial policy of spoliation in Bavaria, burning buildings and crops throughout the rich lands south of the Danube. This had two aims: firstly to put pressure on Maximilian to fight or come to terms before Tallard arrived with reinforcements; and secondly, to ruin Bavaria as a base from which the French and Bavarian armies could attack Vienna, or pursue Marlborough into Franconia if, at some stage, he had to withdraw northwards. But this destruction, coupled with a protracted siege of the town of Rain over 9 to 16 July, caused Prince Eugene to lament "since the Donauwörth action I cannot admire their performances", and later to conclude "If he has to go home without having achieved his objective, he will certainly be ruined."

=== Final positioning ===
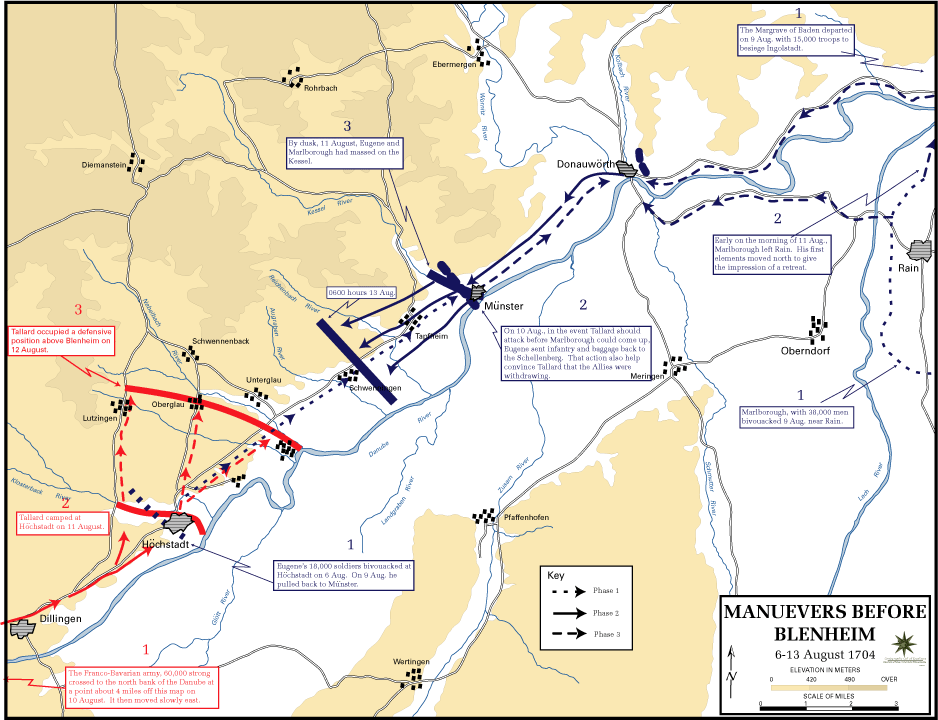
Maneuvers before the battle, 9–13 August

Tallard, with 34,000 men, reached Ulm, joining with Maximilian and Marsin at Augsburg on 5 August, although Maximilian had dispersed his army in response to Marlborough's campaign of ravaging the region. (Note: Lynn (2013, p. 290) states Tallard reached Augsburg on 3 August.) Also on 5 August, Prince Eugene reached Höchstädt, riding that same night to meet with Marlborough at Schrobenhausen. Marlborough knew that another crossing point over the Danube was required in case Donauwörth fell to the enemy; so on 7 August, the first of Margrave Louis William's 15,000 Imperial troops left Marlborough's main force to besiege the heavily defended city of Ingolstadt, 32 km (20 mi) farther down the Danube, with the remainder following two days later. (Note: Modern historians including Falkner, Holmes and David consider this may have been a device to get the "cautious and obstructive Margrave out of the way". In a letter of 31 July 1704 Marlborough assured the Dutch statesman Anthonie Heinsius that the decision to commence a siege was sound.)

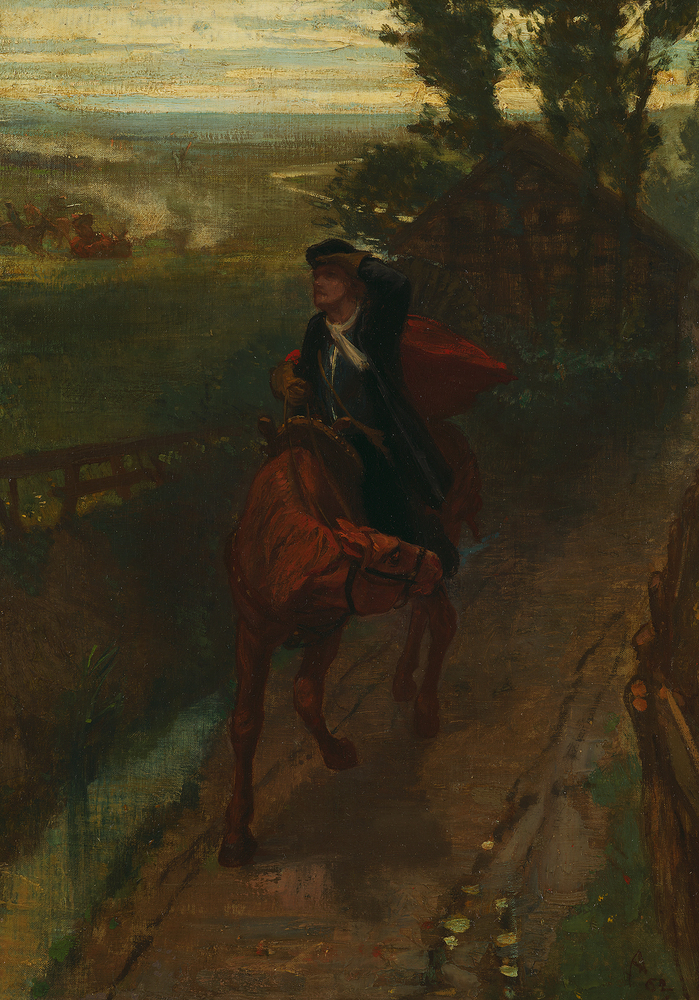
Dutch officer Willem Vleertman scouts the marshy terrain near Blenheim at the risk of his own life

With Prince Eugene's forces at Höchstädt on the north bank of the Danube, and Marlborough's at Rain on the south bank, Tallard and Maximilian debated their next move. Tallard preferred to bide his time, replenish supplies and allow Marlborough's Danube campaign to flounder in the colder autumn weather; Maximilian and Marsin, newly reinforced, were keen to push ahead. The French and Bavarian commanders eventually agreed to attack Prince Eugene's smaller force. On 9 August, the Franco-Bavarian forces began to cross to the north bank of the Danube. On 10 August, Prince Eugene sent an urgent dispatch reporting that he was falling back to Donauwörth. By a series of swift marches Marlborough concentrated his forces on Donauwörth and, by noon 11 August, the link-up was complete.

During 11 August, Tallard pushed forward from the river crossings at Dillingen. By 12 August, the Franco-Bavarian forces were encamped behind the small River Nebel near the village of Blenheim on the plain of Höchstädt. On the same day, Marlborough and Prince Eugene carried out a reconnaissance of the French position from the church spire at Tapfheim, and moved their combined forces to Münster – eight kilometres (five miles) from the French camp. A French reconnaissance under Jacques Joseph Vipart, Marquis de Silly went forward to probe the enemy, but were driven off by Allied troops who had deployed to cover the pioneers of the advancing army, labouring to bridge the numerous streams in the area and improve the passage leading westwards to Höchstädt. (Note: The French had captured four prisoners. Under examination they declared that the whole Allied army was going to move off towards Nördlingen the next morning.) Marlborough quickly moved forward two brigades under the command of Lieutenant General John Wilkes and Brigadier Archibald Rowe to secure the narrow strip of land between the Danube and the wooded Fuchsberg hill, at the Schwenningen defile. Tallard's army numbered 56,000 men and 90 guns; the army of the Grand Alliance, 52,000 men and 66 guns. Some Allied officers who were acquainted with the superior numbers of the enemy, and aware of their strong defensive position, remonstrated with Marlborough about the hazards of attacking; but he was resolute – partly because the Dutch officer Willem Vleertman had scouted the marshy ground before them and reported that the land was perfectly suitable for the troops.

== Battle ==
=== The battlefield ===
The battlefield stretched for nearly 6 km (3 1/2 mi). The extreme right flank of the Franco-Bavarian army rested on the Danube, the undulating pine-covered hills of the Swabian Jura lay to their left. A small stream, the Nebel, fronted the French line; the ground either side of this was marshy and only fordable intermittently. The French right rested on the village of Blenheim near where the Nebel flows into the Danube; the village itself was surrounded by hedges, fences, enclosed gardens, and meadows. Between Blenheim and the village of Oberglauheim to the north west the fields of wheat had been cut to stubble and were now ideal for the deployment of troops. From Oberglauheim to the next hamlet of Lutzingen the terrain of ditches, thickets and brambles was potentially difficult ground for the attackers.

=== Initial Maneuvers ===
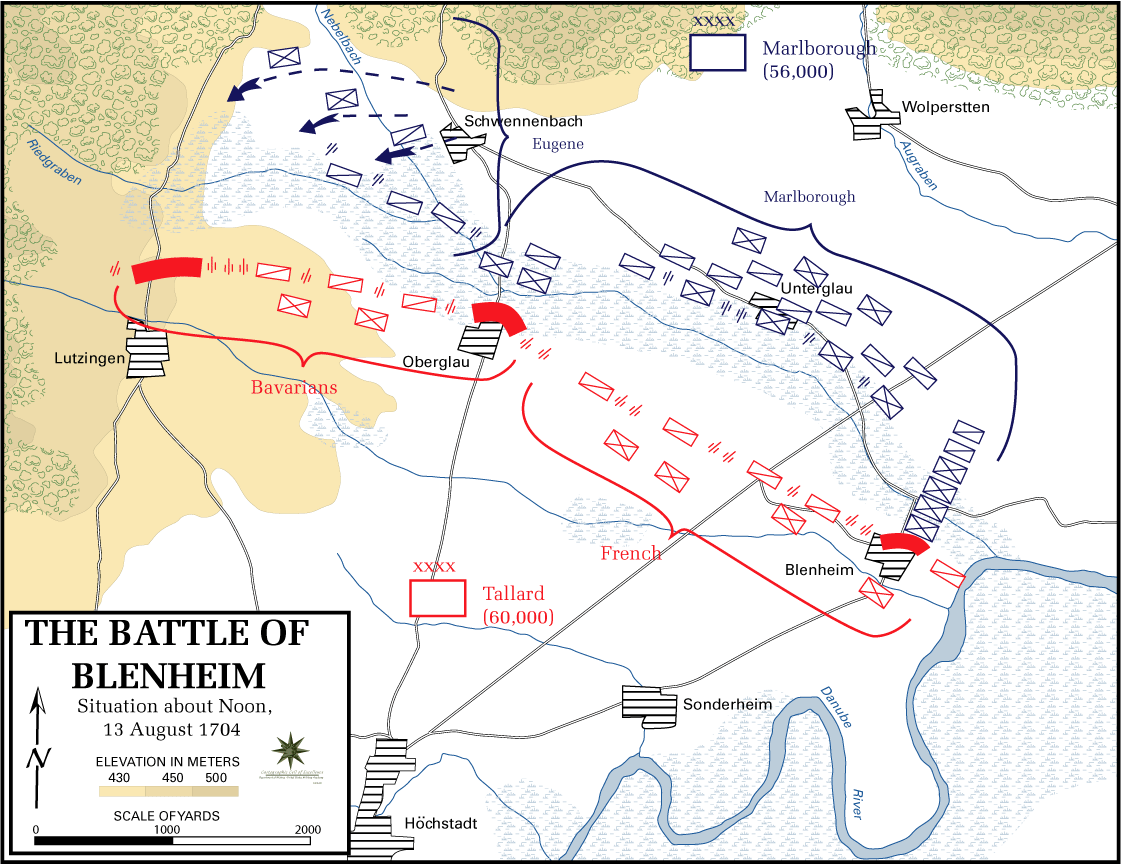
The position of the forces at noon, 13 August. Marlborough took control of the left arm of the Allied forces including the attacks on Blenheim and Oberglauheim, while Prince Eugene commanded the right, including the attacks on Lutzingen.

At 02:00 on 13 August, 40 Allied cavalry squadrons were sent forward, followed at 03:00, in eight columns, by the main Allied force pushing over the River Kessel. At about 06:00 they reached Schwenningen, three kilometres (two miles) from Blenheim. The British and German troops who had held Schwenningen through the night joined the march, making a ninth column on the left of the army. Marlborough and Prince Eugene made their final plans. The Allied commanders agreed that Marlborough would command 36,000 troops and attack Tallard's force of 33,000 on the left, including capturing the village of Blenheim, while Prince Eugene's 16,000 men would attack Maximilian and Marsin's combined forces of 23,000 troops on the right. If this attack was pressed hard, it was anticipated that Maximilian and Marsin would feel unable to send troops to aid Tallard on their right. Lieutenant-General John Cutts would attack Blenheim in concert with Prince Eugene's attack. With the French flanks busy, Marlborough could cross the Nebel and deliver the fatal blow to the French at their center. The Allies would have to wait until Prince Eugene was in position before the general engagement could begin.

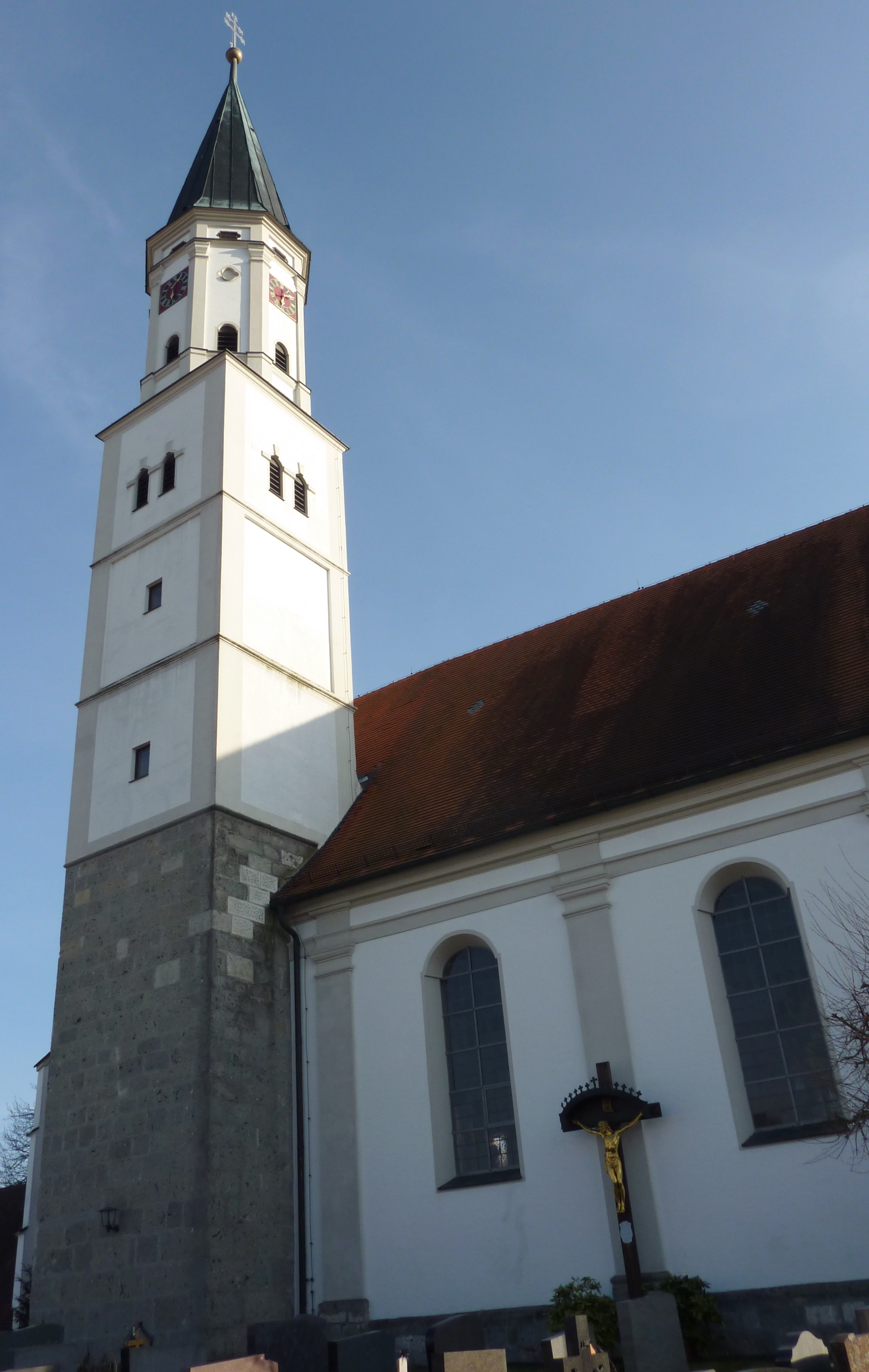
At 9 a.m. on the day of battle Tallard, Maximilian, and Marsin climbed Blenheim's church tower to finalise their plans. St Martin's Church, Blindheim, with octagonal tower c. 1660

Tallard was not anticipating an Allied attack; he had been deceived by intelligence gathered from prisoners taken by de Silly the previous day, and his army's strong position. Tallard and his colleagues believed that Marlborough and Prince Eugene were about to retreat north-westwards towards Nördlingen. (Note: Several sources suggest that Marlborough had planted this corroborative 'evidence' for Tallard.) Tallard wrote a report to this effect to King Louis that morning. Signal guns were fired to bring in the foraging parties and pickets as the French and Bavarian troops drew into battle-order to face the unexpected threat.

At around 08:00 the French artillery on their right wing opened fire, answered by Colonel Holcroft Blood's batteries. (Note: Churchill states 08:30.) The guns were heard by Prince Louis in his camp before Ingolstadt. An hour later, Tallard, Maximilian, and Marsin climbed Blenheim's church tower to finalise their plans. It was settled that Maximilian and Marsin would hold the front from the hills to Oberglauheim, whilst Tallard would defend the ground between Oberglauheim and the Danube. The French commanders were divided as to how to utilise the Nebel. Tallard's preferred tactic was to lure the Allies across before unleashing his cavalry upon them. This was opposed by Marsin and Maximilian who felt it better to close their infantry right up to the stream itself, so that while the enemy was struggling in the marshes, they would be caught in crossfire from Blenheim and Oberglauheim. Tallard's approach was sound if all its parts were implemented, but in the event it allowed Marlborough to cross the Nebel without serious interference and fight the battle he had planned.

=== Deployment ===
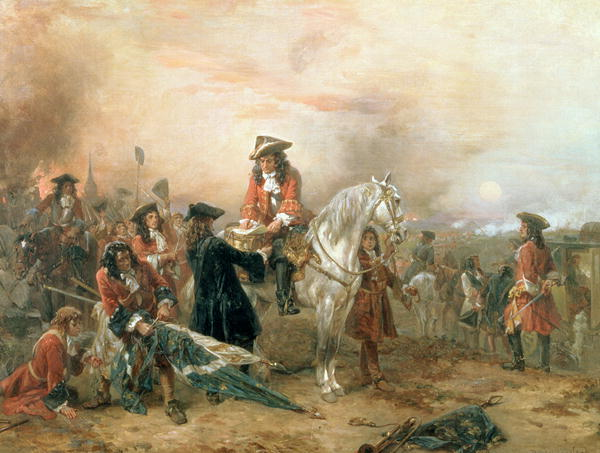
Marlborough signing the post-battle despatch to be sent to England

The Franco-Bavarian commanders deployed their forces. In the village of Lutzingen, Count Alessandro de Maffei positioned five Bavarian battalions with a great battery of 16 guns at the village's edge. In the woods to the left of Lutzingen, seven French battalions under César Armand, Marquis de Rozel moved into place. Between Lutzingen and Oberglauheim Maximilian placed 27 squadrons of cavalry and 14 Bavarian squadrons commanded by d'Arco with 13 more in support nearby under Baron Veit Heinrich Moritz Freiherr von Wolframsdorf. To their right stood Marsin's 40 French squadrons and 12 battalions. The village of Oberglauheim was packed with 14 battalions commanded by Jean-Jules-Armand Colbert, Marquis de Blainville, including the effective Irish Brigade known as the "Wild Geese". Six batteries of guns were ranged alongside the village. On the right of these French and Bavarian positions, between Oberglauheim and Blenheim, Tallard deployed 64 French and Walloon squadrons, 16 of which were from Marsin, supported by nine French battalions standing near the Höchstädt road. In the cornfield next to Blenheim stood three battalions from the Regiment de Roi. Nine battalions occupied the village itself, commanded by Gaëtan (or Godefroi) de Clérambault, comte de Palluau. Four battalions stood to the rear and a further eleven were in reserve. These battalions were supported by Count Gabriel d'Hautefeuille's twelve squadrons of dismounted dragoons. By 11:00 Tallard, Maximilian, and Marsin were in place. Many of the Allied generals were hesitant to attack such a strong position. The Earl of Orkney later said that, "had I been asked to give my opinion, I had been against it."

Prince Eugene was expected to be in position by 11:00, but due to the difficult terrain and enemy fire, progress was slow. Cutts' column – which by 10:00 had expelled the enemy from two water mills on the Nebel – had already deployed by the river against Blenheim, enduring over the next three hours severe fire from a six-gun heavy battery posted near the village. The rest of Marlborough's army, waiting in their ranks on the forward slope, were also forced to bear the cannonade from the French artillery, suffering 2,000 casualties before the attack could even start. Meanwhile, engineers repaired a stone bridge across the Nebel, and constructed five additional bridges or causeways across the marsh between Blenheim and Oberglauheim. Marlborough's anxiety was finally allayed when, just past noon, Colonel William Cadogan reported that Prince Eugene's Prussian and Danish infantry were in place – the order for the general advance was given. At 13:00, Cutts was ordered to attack the village of Blenheim whilst Prince Eugene was requested to assault Lutzingen on the Allied right flank.

=== Blenheim ===
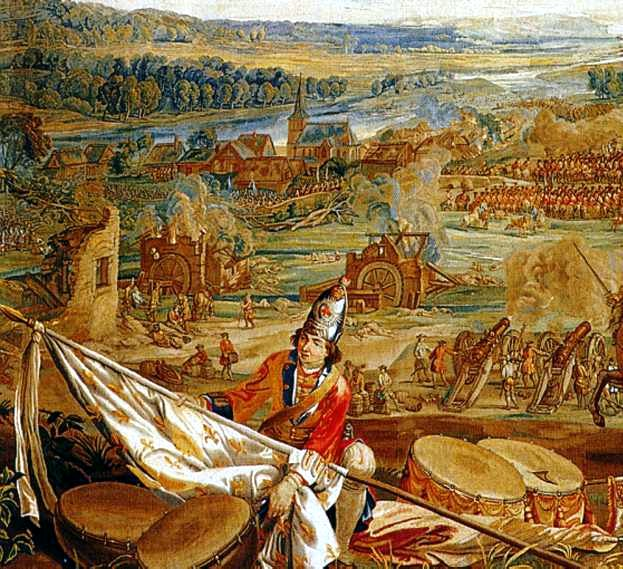
Part of the Battle of Blenheim tapestry at Blenheim Palace by Judocus de Vos. In the background is the village of Blenheim; in the middle ground are the two water mills that Rowe had to take to gain a bridgehead over the Nebel. The foreground shows an English grenadier with a captured French color.

Cutts ordered Rowe's brigade to attack. The English infantry rose from the edge of the Nebel, and silently marched towards Blenheim, a distance of some 150 m (160 yd). James Ferguson's Scottish brigade supported Rowe's left, and moved towards the barricades between the village and the river, defended by Hautefeuille's dragoons. As the range closed to within 30 m (30 yd), the French fired a deadly volley. Rowe had ordered that there should be no firing from his men until he struck his sword upon the palisades, but as he stepped forward to give the signal, he fell mortally wounded. (Note: Two of Rowe's staff officers were killed trying to carry him away: Lieutenant Colonel Dalyell and Major Campbell.) The survivors of the leading companies closed up the gaps in their ranks and rushed forward. Small parties penetrated the defenses, but repeated French volleys forced the English back and inflicted heavy casualties. As the attack faltered, eight squadrons of elite Gens d'Armes, commanded by the veteran Swiss officer, Béat Jacques II de Zurlauben, fell on the English troops, cutting at the exposed flank of Rowe's own regiment. (Note: Churchill and Coxe state only three squadrons of Gens d'Armes. Rowe's own regiment lost their colors, but they were soon retrieved by the Hessians.) Wilkes' Hessian brigade, nearby in the marshy grass at the water's edge, stood firm and repulsed the Gens d'Armes with steady fire, enabling the English and Hessians to re-order and launch another attack.

Although the Allies were again repulsed, these persistent attacks on Blenheim eventually bore fruit, panicking Clérambault into making the worst French error of the day. Without consulting Tallard, Clérambault ordered his reserve battalions into the village, upsetting the balance of the French position and nullifying the French numerical superiority. "The men were so crowded in upon one another", wrote Mérode-Westerloo, "that they couldn't even fire – let alone receive or carry out any orders". Marlborough, spotting this error, now countermanded Cutts' intention to launch a third attack, and ordered him simply to contain the enemy within Blenheim; no more than 5,000 Allied soldiers were able to pen in twice the number of French infantry and dragoons.

=== Lutzingen ===
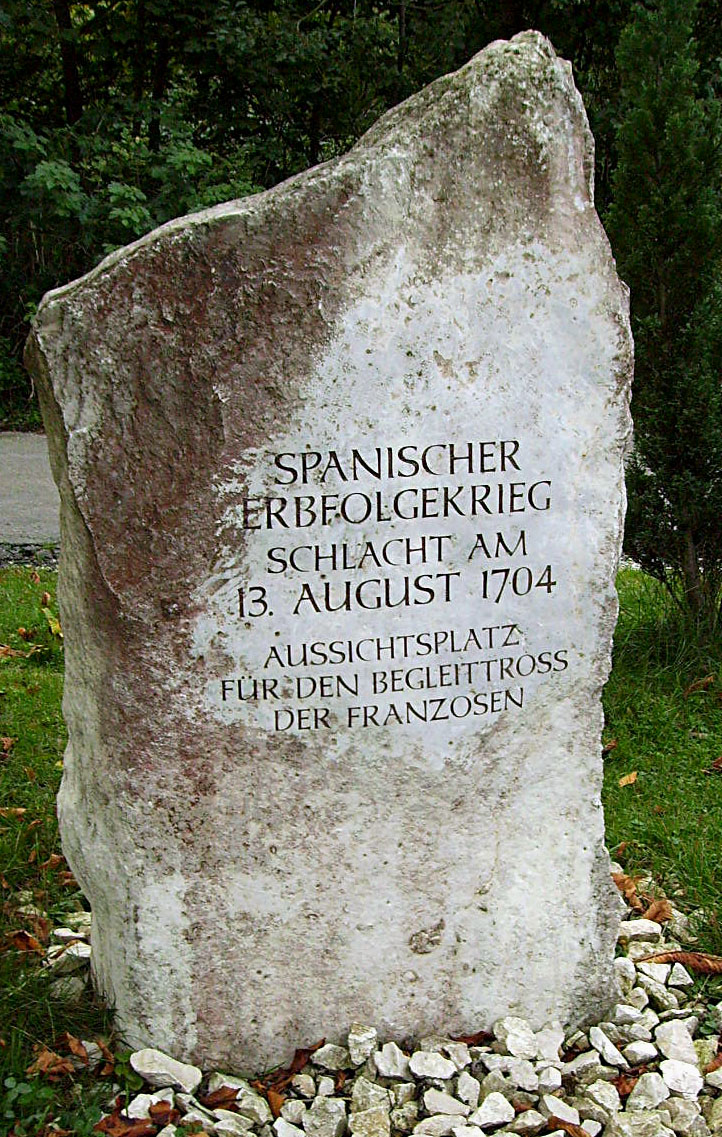
Memorial for the Battle of Blenheim 1704, Lutzingen, Germany

... Prince Eugene and the Imperial troops had been repulsed three times – driven right back to the woods – and had taken a real drubbing.

— Mérode-Westerloo

On the Allied right, Prince Eugene's Prussian and Danish forces were desperately fighting the numerically superior forces of Maximilian and Marsin. Leopold I, Prince of Anhalt-Dessau led forward four brigades across the Nebel to assault the well-fortified position of Lutzingen. Here, the Nebel was less of an obstacle, but the great battery positioned on the edge of the village enjoyed a good field of fire across the open ground stretching to the hamlet of Schwennenbach. As soon as the infantry crossed the stream, they were struck by Maffei's infantry, and salvoes from the Bavarian guns positioned both in front of the village and in enfilade on the wood-line to the right. Despite heavy casualties the Prussians attempted to storm the great battery, whilst the Danes, under Count Jobst von Scholten, attempted to drive the French infantry out of the copses beyond the village.

With the infantry heavily engaged, Prince Eugene's cavalry picked its way across the Nebel. After an initial success, his first line of cavalry, under the Imperial General of Horse, Prince Maximilian of Hanover, were pressed by the second line of Marsin's cavalry and forced back across the Nebel in confusion. The exhausted French were unable to follow up their advantage, and both cavalry forces tried to regroup and reorder their ranks. Without cavalry support, and threatened with envelopment, the Prussian and Danish infantry were in turn forced to pull back across the Nebel. Panic gripped some of Prince Eugene's troops as they crossed the stream. Ten infantry colors were lost to the Bavarians, and hundreds of prisoners taken; it was only through the leadership of Prince Eugene and the Prince Maximilian of Hanover that the Imperial infantry was prevented from abandoning the field.

After rallying his troops near Schwennenbach – well beyond their starting point – Prince Eugene prepared to launch a second attack, led by the second-line squadrons under the Duke of Württemberg-Teck. Yet again they were caught in the murderous crossfire from the artillery in Lutzingen and Oberglauheim, and were once again thrown back in disarray. The French and Bavarians were almost as disordered as their opponents, and they too were in need of inspiration from their commander, Maximilian, who was seen " ... riding up and down, and inspiring his men with fresh courage." Anhalt-Dessau's Danish and Prussian infantry attacked a second time but could not sustain the advance without proper support. Once again they fell back across the stream.

=== Center and Oberglauheim ===
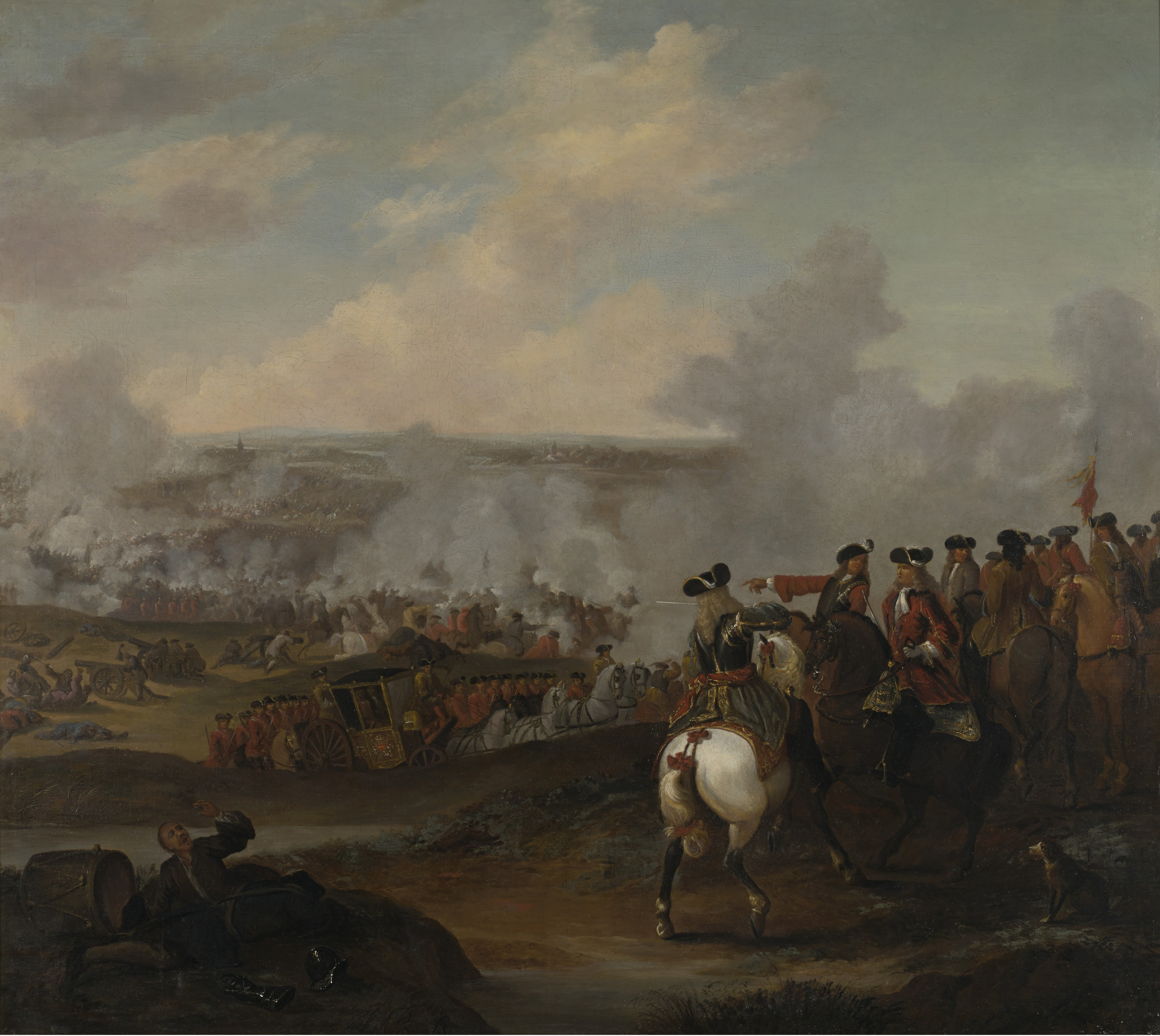
The Battle of Blenheim by Joshua Ross

Whilst these events around Blenheim and Lutzingen were taking place, Marlborough was preparing to cross the Nebel. Hulsen's brigade of Hessians and Hanoverians and the earl of Orkney's British brigade advanced across the stream and were supported by dismounted British dragoons and ten British cavalry squadrons. This covering force allowed Charles Churchill's Dutch, British and German infantry and further cavalry units to advance and form up on the plain beyond. Marlborough arranged his infantry battalions in a novel manner, with gaps sufficient to allow the cavalry to move freely between them. He ordered the formation forward. Once again Zurlauben's Gens d'Armes charged, looking to rout Henry Lumley's English cavalry who linked Cutts' column facing Blenheim with Churchill's infantry. As the elite French cavalry attacked, they were faced by five English squadrons under Colonel Francis Palmes. To the consternation of the French, the Gens d'Armes were pushed back in confusion and were pursued well beyond the Maulweyer stream that flows through Blenheim. "What? Is it possible?" exclaimed Maximilian, "the gentlemen of France fleeing?" Palmes attempted to follow up his success but was repulsed by other French cavalry and musket fire from the edge of Blenheim.

Nevertheless, Tallard was alarmed by the repulse of the Gens d'Armes and urgently rode across the field to ask Marsin for reinforcements; but on the basis of being hard pressed by Prince Eugene, whose second attack was underway, Marsin refused. As Tallard consulted with Marsin, more of his infantry were taken into Blenheim by Clérambault. Fatally, Tallard, although aware of the situation, did nothing to rectify it, leaving him with just the nine battalions of infantry near the Höchstädt road to oppose the massed enemy ranks in the center. Zurlauben tried several more times to disrupt the Allies forming on Tallard's side of the stream. His front-line cavalry darted forward down the gentle slope towards the Nebel, but the attacks lacked co-ordination, and the Allied infantry's steady volleys disconcerted the French horsemen. During these skirmishes Zurlauben fell mortally wounded; he died two days later. At this stage the time was just after 15:00.

The Danish cavalry, under Carl Rudolf, Duke of Württemberg-Neuenstadt, had made slow work of crossing the Nebel near Oberglauheim. Harassed by Marsin's infantry near the village, the Danes were driven back across the stream. Count Horn's Dutch infantry managed to push the French back from the water's edge, but it was apparent that before Marlborough could launch his main effort against Tallard, Oberglauheim would have to be secured.

Count Horn directed Anton Günther, Fürst von Holstein-Beck to take the village, but his two Dutch brigades were cut down by the French and Irish troops, capturing and badly wounding Holstein-Beck during the action. The battle was now in the balance. If Holstein-Beck's Dutch column were destroyed, the Allied army would be split in two: Prince Eugene's wing would be isolated from Marlborough's, passing the initiative to the Franco-Bavarian forces. (Note: Tallard later recorded – "At this moment I saw the hope of victory.") Seeing the opportunity, Marsin ordered his cavalry to change from facing Prince Eugene, and turn towards their right and the open flank of Churchill's infantry drawn up in front of Unterglau. Marlborough, who had crossed the Nebel on a makeshift bridge to take personal control, ordered Hulsen's Hanoverian battalions to support the Dutch infantry. A nine-gun artillery battery and a Dutch cavalry brigade under Averock were also called forward, but the cavalry soon came under pressure from Marsin's more numerous squadrons.

Marlborough now requested Prince Eugene to release Count Hendrick Fugger and his Imperial Cuirassier brigade to help repel the French cavalry thrust. Despite his own difficulties, Prince Eugene at once complied. Although the Nebel stream lay between Fugger's and Marsin's squadrons, the French were forced to change front to meet this new threat, thus preventing Marsin from striking at Marlborough's infantry. Fugger's cuirassiers charged and, striking at a favourable angle, threw back Marsin's squadrons in disorder. With support from Blood's batteries, the Hessian, Hanoverian and Dutch infantry, now commanded by Count Berensdorf, succeeded in pushing the French and Irish infantry back into Oberglauheim so that they could not again threaten Churchill's flank as he moved against Tallard. The French commander in the village, de Blainville, was numbered among the heavy casualties.

=== Breakthrough ===
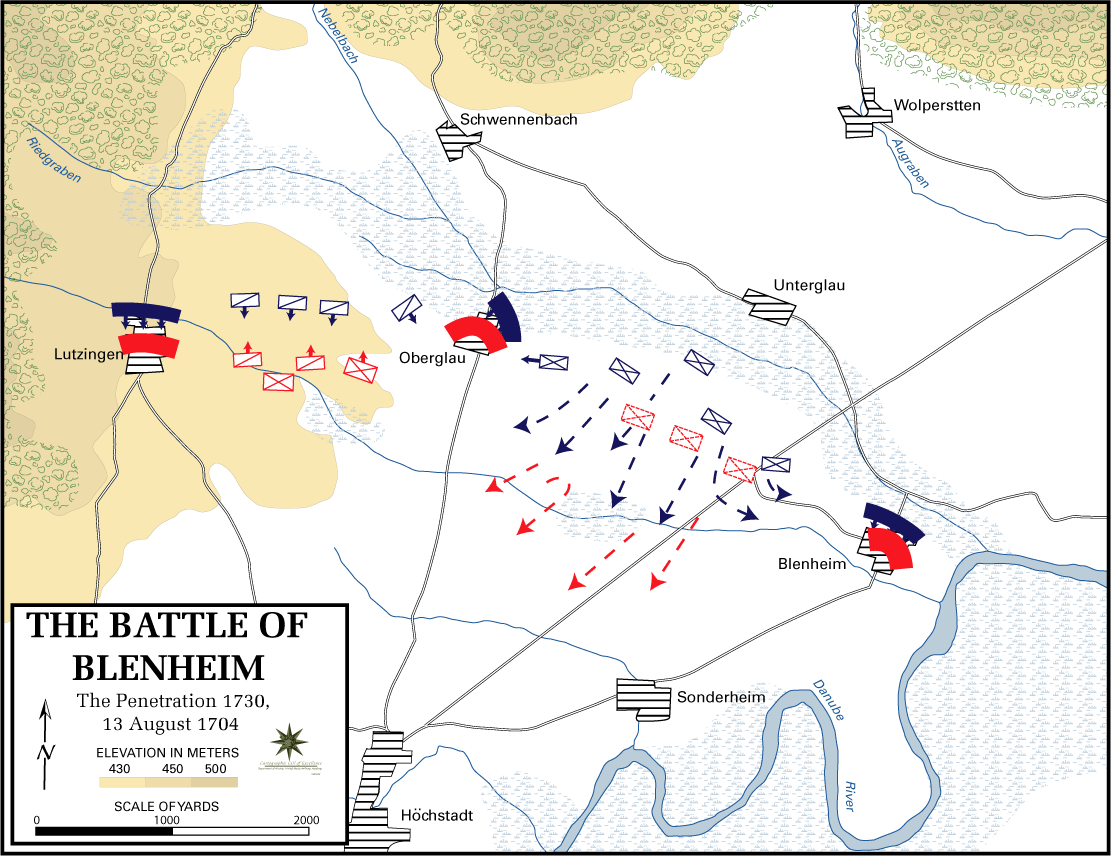
Breakthrough: Position of the battle at 17:30

The [French] foot remained in the best order I ever saw, till they were cut to pieces almost in rank and file. – Lord Orkney.

By 16:00, with large parts of the Franco-Bavarian army besieged in Blenheim and Oberglau, the Allied center of 81 squadrons (nine squadrons had been transferred from Cutts' column) supported by 18 battalions was firmly planted amidst the French line of 64 squadrons and nine battalions of raw recruits. There was now a pause in the battle: Marlborough wanted to attack simultaneously along the whole front, and Prince Eugene, after his second repulse, needed time to reorganize.

By just after 17:00 all was ready along the Allied front. Marlborough's two lines of cavalry had now moved to the front of his line of battle, with the two supporting lines of infantry behind them. Mérode-Westerloo attempted to extricate some French infantry crowded into Blenheim, but Clérambault ordered the troops back into the village. The French cavalry exerted themselves once more against the Allied first line – Lumley's English and Scots on the Allied left, and Reinhard Vincent Graf von Hompesch's Dutch and German squadrons on the Allied right. Tallard's squadrons, which lacked infantry support and were tired, managed to push the Allied first line back to their infantry support. With the battle still not won, Marlborough had to rebuke one of his cavalry officers who was attempting to leave the field – "Sir, you are under a mistake, the enemy lies that way ..." Marlborough commanded the second Allied line, under Cuno Josua von Bülow and Friedrich Johann von Bothmer, to move forward, and, driving through the center, the Allies finally routed Tallard's tired cavalry. The Prussian Life Dragoons' Colonel, Ludwig von Blumenthal, and his second in command, Lieutenant Colonel von Hacke, fell next to each other, but the charge succeeded. With their cavalry in headlong flight, the remaining nine French infantry battalions fought with desperate valour, trying to form a square, but they were overwhelmed by Blood's close-range artillery and platoon fire. Mérode-Westerloo later wrote – "[They] died to a man where they stood, stationed right out in the open plain – supported by nobody."

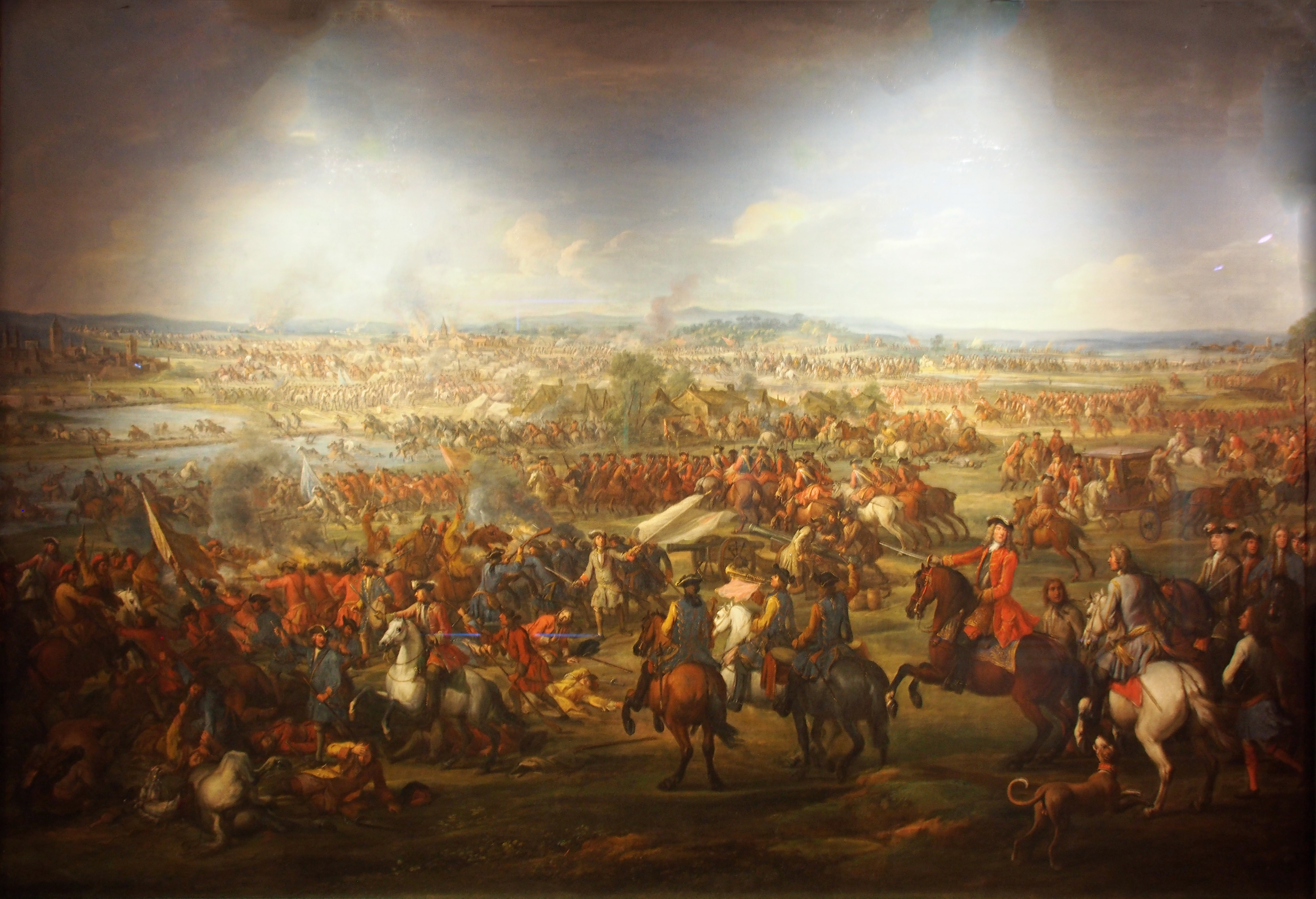
The Duke of Marlborough and the Earl of Cadogan at Blenheim (Hochstadt) by John Wootton

The majority of Tallard's retreating troops headed for Höchstädt but most did not make the safety of the town, plunging instead into the Danube where over 3,000 French horsemen drowned; (Note: Churchill states that it was the "greater part" of 2,000 men who drowned.) others were cut down by the pursuing Allied cavalry. The Marquis de Gruignan attempted a counter-attack, but he was brushed aside by the triumphant Allies. After a final rally behind his camp's tents, shouting entreaties to stand and fight, Tallard was caught up in the rout and swept towards Sonderheim. Surrounded by a squadron of Hessian troops, Tallard surrendered to Lieutenant Colonel de Boinenburg, the Prince of Hesse-Kassel's aide-de-camp, and was sent under escort to Marlborough. Marlborough welcomed the French commander – "I am very sorry that such a cruel misfortune should have fallen upon a soldier for whom I have the highest regard."

Meanwhile, the Allies had once again attacked the Bavarian stronghold at Lutzingen. Prince Eugene became exasperated with the performance of his Imperial cavalry whose third attack had failed: he had already shot two of his troopers to prevent a general flight. Then, declaring in disgust that he wished to "fight among brave men and not among cowards", Prince Eugene went into the attack with the Prussian and Danish infantry, as did Leopold I, waving a regimental color to inspire his troops. This time the Prussians were able to storm the great Bavarian battery, and overwhelm the guns' crews. Beyond the village, Scholten's Danes defeated the French infantry in a desperate hand-to-hand bayonet struggle. (Note: Danish infantry suffered 2,401 casualties (including 1,350 killed) fighting for possession of the woods beyond Lutzingen) When they saw that the center had broken, Maximilian and Marsin decided the battle was lost; like the remnants of Tallard's army, they fled the battlefield, albeit in better order than Tallard's men. Attempts to organize an Allied force to prevent Marsin's withdrawal failed owing to the exhaustion of the cavalry, and the growing confusion in the field.

=== Fall of Blenheim ===
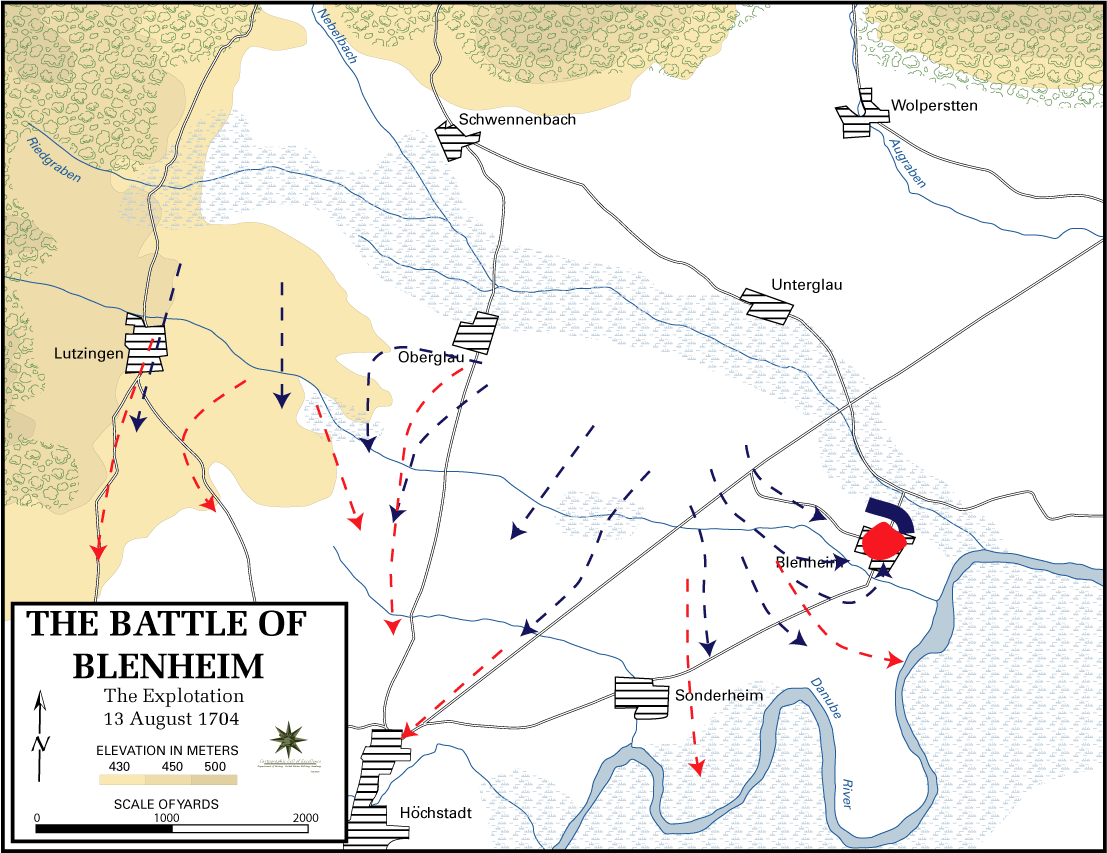
Pursuit

... our men fought in and through the fire ... until many on both sides were burned to death. – Private Deane, 1st Regiment Foot Guards.

Marlborough now turned his attention from the fleeing enemy to direct Churchill to detach more infantry to storm Blenheim. Orkney's infantry, Hamilton's English brigade and St Paul's Hanoverians moved across the trampled wheat to the cottages. Fierce hand-to-hand fighting gradually forced the French towards the village center, in and around the walled churchyard which had been prepared for defense. Lord John Hay and Charles Ross's dismounted dragoons were also sent, but suffered under a counter-charge delivered by the regiments of Artois and Provence under command of Colonel de la Silvière. Colonel Belville's Hanoverians were fed into the battle to steady the resolve of the dragoons, who attacked again. The Allied progress was slow and hard, and like the defenders, they suffered many casualties.

Many of the cottages were now burning, obscuring the field of fire and driving the defenders out of their positions. Hearing the din of battle in Blenheim, Tallard sent a message to Marlborough offering to order the garrison to withdraw from the field. "Inform Monsieur Tallard", replied Marlborough, "that, in the position in which he is now, he has no command." Nevertheless, as dusk came the Allied commander was anxious for a quick conclusion. The French infantry fought tenaciously to hold on to their position in Blenheim, but their commander was nowhere to be found. By now Blenheim was under assault from every side by three British generals: Cutts, Churchill, and Orkney. The French had repulsed every attack, but many had seen what had happened on the plain: their army was routed and they were cut off. Orkney, attacking from the rear, now tried a different tactic – "... it came into my head to beat parley", he later wrote, "which they accepted of and immediately their Brigadier de Nouville capitulated with me to be prisoner at discretion and lay down their arms." Threatened by Allied guns, other units followed their example. It was not until 21:00 that the Marquis de Blanzac, who had taken charge in Clérambault's absence, reluctantly accepted the inevitability of defeat, and some 10,000 of France's best infantry had laid down their arms.

During these events Marlborough was still in the saddle organizing the pursuit of the broken enemy. Pausing for a moment, he scribbled on the back of an old tavern bill a note addressed to his wife, Sarah: "I have no time to say more but to beg you will give my duty to the Queen, and let her know her army has had a glorious victory." (Note: The message was carried to London by Colonel Daniel Parke.)

== Aftermath ==
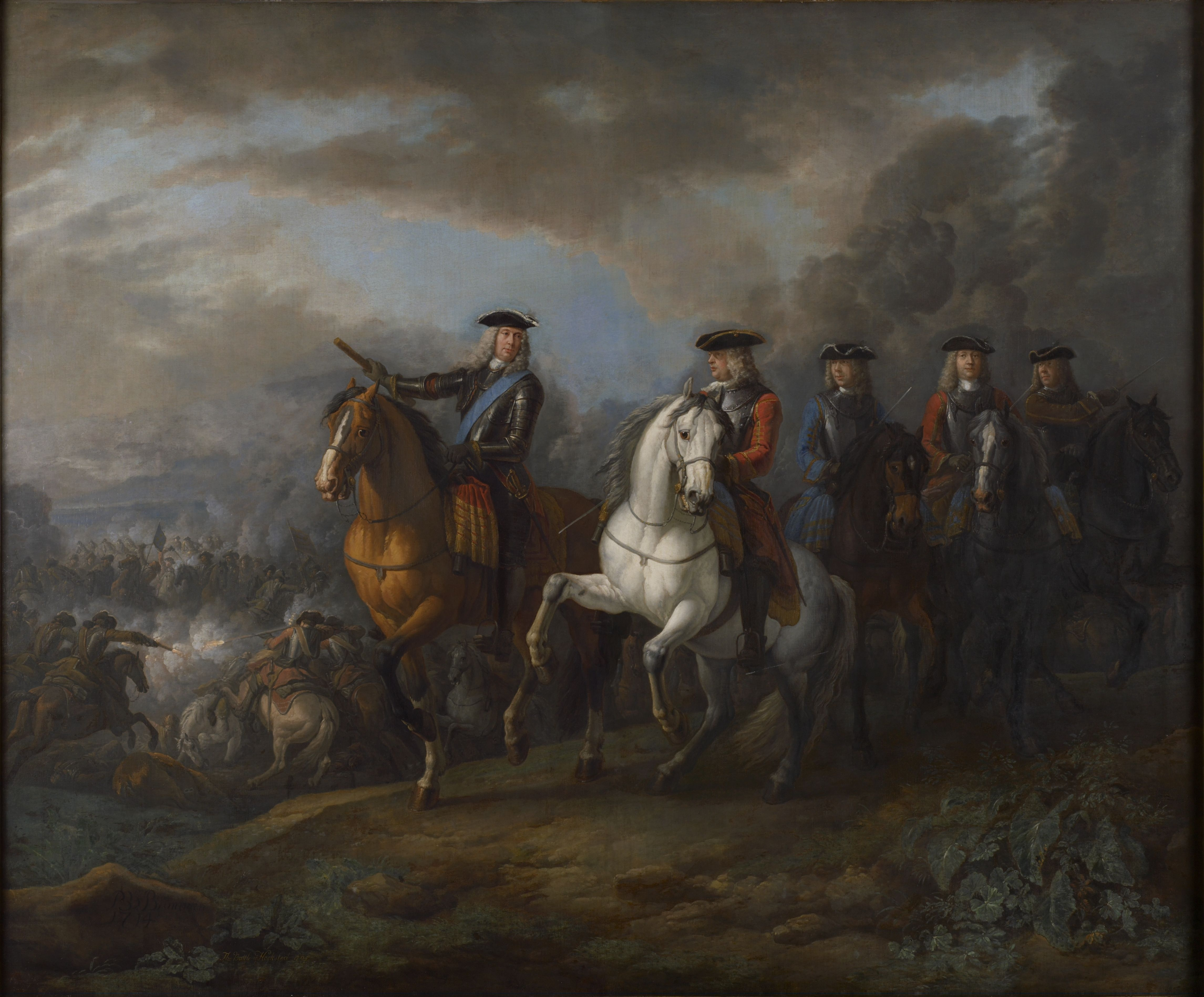
Marlborough and Cadogan at the Battle of Blenheim by Pieter van Bloemen

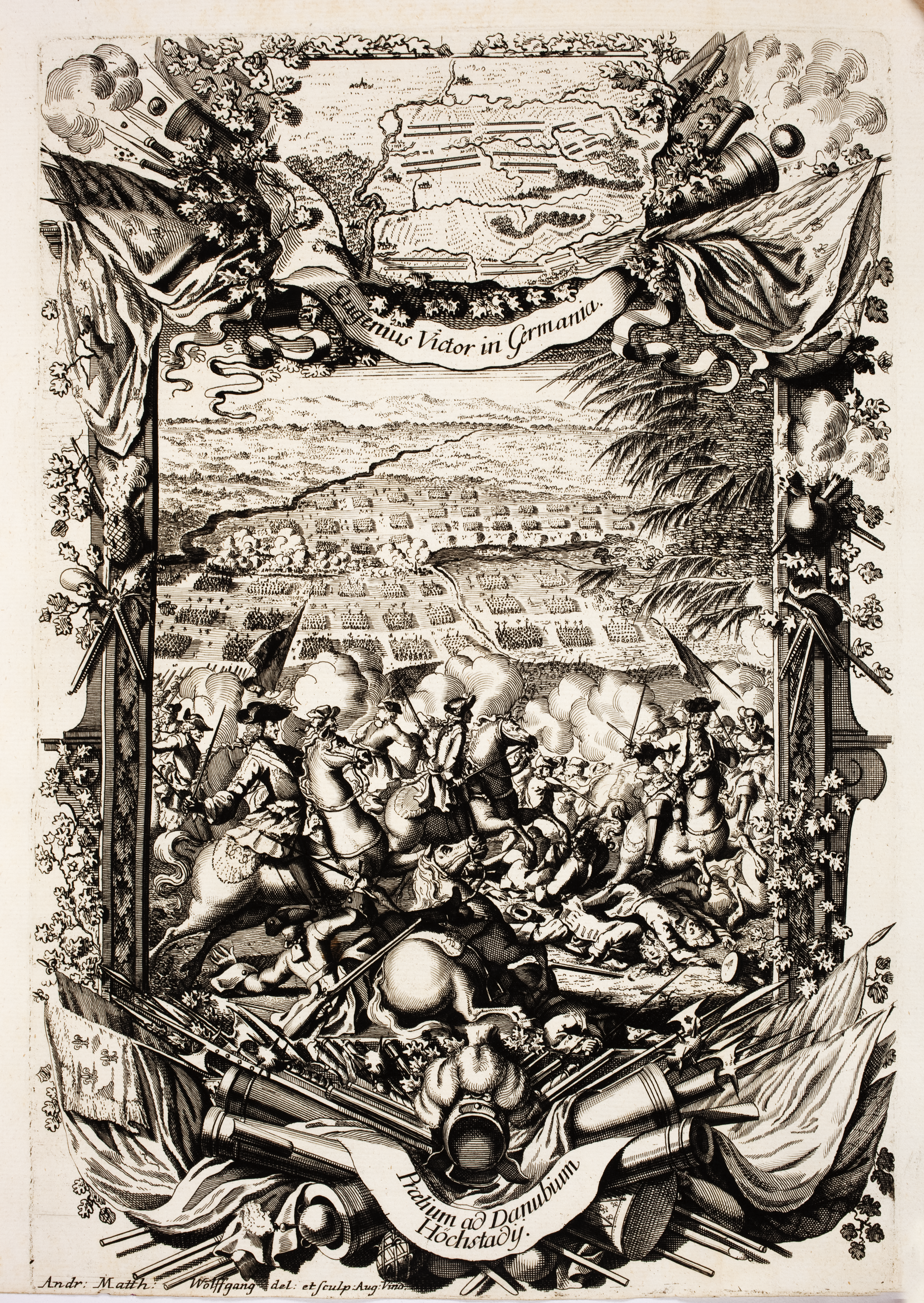
Battle of Höchstädt by Wolfgang and Vind

French losses were immense, with over 27,000 killed, wounded and captured. Moreover, the myth of French invincibility had been destroyed, and King Louis's hopes of a victorious early peace were over. Mérode-Westerloo summarized the case against Tallard's army:

The French lost this battle for a wide variety of reasons. For one thing they had too good an opinion of their own ability ... Another point was their faulty field dispositions, and in addition there was rampant indiscipline and inexperience displayed ... It took all these faults to lose so celebrated a battle.

It was a hard-fought contest: Prince Eugene observed that "I have not a squadron or battalion which did not charge four times at least."

The Battle of Blenheim was perhaps the most important battle in the early years of the war, as Marlborough and Prince Eugene had saved the Habsburg Empire and thereby preserved the Grand Alliance from collapse. Munich, Augsburg, Ingolstadt, Ulm and the remaining territory of Bavaria soon fell to the Allies. By the Treaty of Ilbersheim, signed on 7 November, Bavaria was placed under Austrian military rule, allowing the Habsburgs to use its resources for the rest of the conflict.

The remnants of Maximilian and Marsin's wing limped back to Strasbourg, losing another 7,000 men through desertion. Despite being offered the chance to remain as ruler of Bavaria, under the strict terms of an alliance with Austria, Maximilian left his country and family in order to continue the war against the Allies from the Spanish Netherlands where he still held the post of governor-general. Tallard – who, unlike his subordinates, was not ransomed or exchanged – was taken to England and imprisoned in Nottingham until his release in 1711.

The 1704 campaign lasted longer than usual, for the Allies sought to extract the maximum advantage. Realising that France was too powerful to be forced to make peace by a single victory, Prince Eugene, Marlborough and Prince Louis met to plan their next moves. For the following year Marlborough proposed a campaign along the valley of the Moselle to carry the war deep into France. This required the capture of the major fortress of Landau which guarded the Rhine, and the towns of Trier and Trarbach on the Moselle itself. Trier was taken on 27 October and Landau fell on 23 November to Prince Louis and Prince Eugene; with the fall of Trarbach on 20 December, the campaign season for 1704 came to an end. The planned offensive never materialised as the Grand Alliance's army had to depart the Moselle to defend Liège from a French counteroffensive. The war raged on for another decade.

Marlborough returned to England on 14 December (O.S) to the acclamation of Queen Anne and the country. In the first days of January, the 110 cavalry standards and 128 infantry colors that had been captured during the battle were borne in procession to Westminster Hall. (Note: Churchill states 171 standards and 129 colors.) In February 1705, Queen Anne, who had made Marlborough a duke in 1702, granted him the Park of Woodstock Palace and promised a sum of £240,000 to build a suitable house as a gift from a grateful Crown in recognition of his victory; this resulted in the construction of Blenheim Palace. The British historian Sir Edward Shepherd Creasy considered Blenheim one of the pivotal battles in history, writing: "Had it not been for Blenheim, all Europe might at this day suffer under the effect of French conquests resembling those of Alexander in extent and those of the Romans in durability." The military historian John A. Lynn considers this claim unjustified, for King Louis never had such an objective; the campaign in Bavaria was intended only to bring a favourable peace settlement and not domination over Europe.

Lake Poet Robert Southey criticized the Battle of Blenheim in his anti-war poem "After Blenheim", but later praised the victory as "the greatest victory which had ever done honor to British arms".

== Sources ==
- Barnett, Correlli (1999). Marlborough. Wordsworth Editions Limited. ISBN 978-1-84022-200-5.
- Caddick-Adams, Peter (2001). "Blenheim, battle and campaign of". In Holmes, Richard (ed.). The Oxford Companion to Military History. Oxford: Oxford University Press. ISBN 0-19-866209-2.
- Chandler, David G. (1998). A Guide to the Battlefields of Europe. Wordsworth Editions Limited. ISBN 978-1-85326-694-2.
- Chandler, David G. (2003). Marlborough as Military Commander. Spellmount Ltd. ISBN 978-1-86227-195-1.
- Chandler, David (1964). "Blenheim, 1704". In Falls, Cyril (ed.). Great Military Battles. New York City: MacMillan. pp. 30–41. OCLC 221501112.
- Clodfelter, M. (2017). Warfare and Armed Conflicts: A Statistical Encyclopedia of Casualty and Other Figures, 1492–2015 (4th ed.). Jefferson, NC: McFarland. ISBN 978-0-7864-7470-7.
- Churchill, Winston (1934). Marlborough: His Life and Times. Vol. II. London: George G Harrap.
- Churchill, Winston (2002). Marlborough: His Life and Times. Vol. Bk. 1, vol. ii. University of Chicago Press. ISBN 978-0-226-10633-5.
- Coxe, William (1847). Memoirs of the Duke of Marlborough. Vol. i. London.
- Creasy, Edward Shepherd (1851). The Fifteen Decisive Battles of the World. Vol. II. London: Richard Bentley.
- David, Saul (2012). All the King's Men: The British Soldier from the Restoration to Waterloo. London: Viking. ISBN 978-0-670-91663-4.
- Falkner, James (2004). Battle Story: Blenheim 1704. Pen & Sword. ISBN 0752499688.
- Falkner, James (2008). Marlborough's Battlefields. Barnsley, UK: Pen and Sword. ISBN 978-1-84415-632-0.
- Falkner, James (2014). Blenheim 1704: Marlborough's Greatest Victory. Spellmount. ISBN 978-1-84415-050-2.
- Henderson, Nicholas (1966). Prince Eugen of Savoy. Weidenfeld & Nicolson. ISBN 978-1-84212-597-7.
- Holmes, Richard (2008). Marlborough: England's Fragile Genius. HarperCollins. ISBN 978-0-00-722571-2.
- Lynn, John A. (2013). The Wars of Louis XIV 1667–1714. Routledge. ISBN 978-1-317-89951-8.
- McKay, Derek (1977). Prince Eugene of Savoy. Thames & Hudson. ISBN 978-0-500-87007-5.
- Nimwegen, Olaf van (1995). De subsistentie van het leger: Logistiek en strategie van het Geallieerde en met name het Staatse leger tijdens de Spaanse Successieoorlog in de Nederlanden en het Heilige Roomse Rijk (1701-1712) [The subsistence of the Allied and especially the Dutch army during the War of the Spanish Succession] (Thesis) (in Dutch). Universiteit Utrecht.
- Nimwegen, Olaf van (2020). De Veertigjarige Oorlog 1672–1712 (in Dutch). Prometheus. ISBN 978-90-446-3871-4.
- Ostwald, Jamel (2000). ""The 'Decisive' Battle of Ramillies, 1706: Prerequisites for Decisiveness in Early Modern Warfare."". The Journal of Military History. 42 (3): 649–677. doi:10.2307/120864. JSTOR 44224692.
- Phelan, Ivan P. (1990). "Marlborough as Logistician (Continued)". Journal of the Society for Army Historical Research. 68 (273): 36–48. ISSN 0037-9700. JSTOR 44224692.
- Speck, William Arthur (2006). Robert Southey: Entire Man of Letters. New Haven, CT: Yale University Press. ISBN 0-300-11681-0.
- Spencer, Charles (2005). Blenheim: Battle for Europe. Phoenix. ISBN 978-0-304-36704-7.
- Tincey, John (2004). Blenheim 1704: The Duke of Marlborough's Masterpiece. Osprey Publishing Ltd. ISBN 978-1-84176-771-0.
- Tucker, Spencer C., ed. (2009). A Global Chronology of Conflict: From the Ancient World to the Modern Middle East. Vol. 2. ABC-CLIO.
- Tucker, Spencer C. (2015). Wars That Changed History: 50 of the World's Greatest Conflicts. ABC-CLIO. ISBN 978-1-61069-786-6.
- Webb, Stephen Saunders (2013). Marlborough's America. New York: Yale University Press. ISBN 978-0-300-17859-3.
- Weigley, Russell F. (2004). The Age of Battles: The Quest for Decisive Warfare from Breitenfeld to Waterloo. Indiana University Press. ISBN 978-0-253-21707-3.
- De Witt, Huberts (1912). "Vleertman". Nieuw Nederlandsch Biografisch Woordenboek (NNBW). Deel 3.
- Wijn, J.W. (1956). Het Staatsche Leger: Deel VIII Het tijdperk van de Spaanse Successieoorlog (The Dutch States Army: Part VIII The era of the War of the Spanish Succession) (in Dutch). Martinus Nijhoff.
