= Willem Vleertman =

Dutch States Army officer and engineer

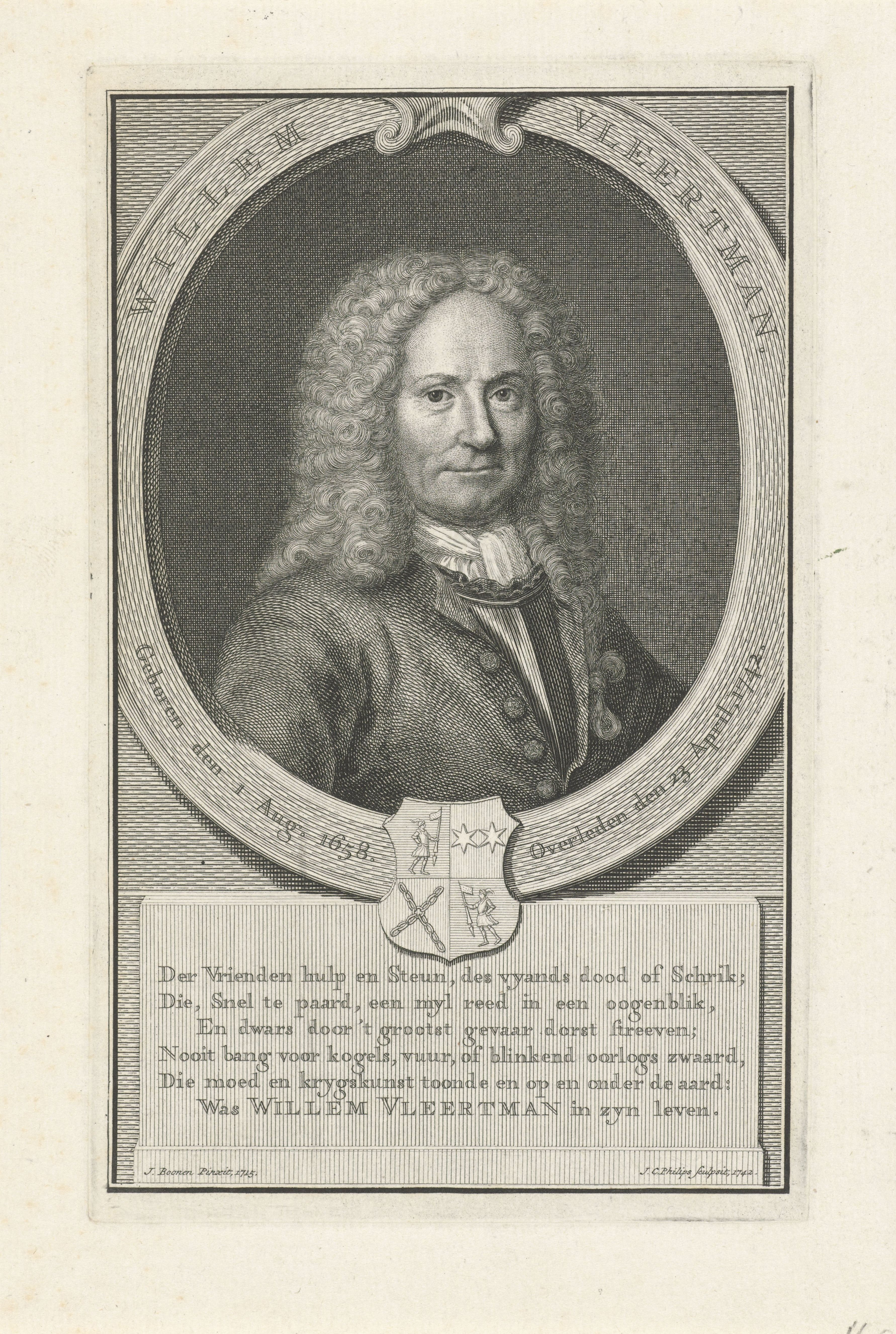
- Portrait of Willem Vleertman
- Born: 1 August 1658
- Died: 23 April 1742 (aged 83)
- Allegiance: Dutch Republic (1672–1699); Holstein-Gottorp (1700); Dutch Republic (1701–1713); Prussia (1714–1715); Dutch Republic (1716–1742)
- Conflicts: (Incomplete): Franco-Dutch War; Siege of Naarden; Siege of Bonn; Battle of Seneffe; Nine Years' War; Invasion of England; Battle of the Boyne; Siege of Namur; Great Northern War; Siege of Tönning; War of the Spanish Succession; Siege of Kaiserswerth; Capture of Middelburg; Siege of Venlo; Siege of Stevensweert; Siege of Roermond; Siege of Liége; Siege of Bonn; Battle of Schellenberg; Battle of Blenheim; Siege of Landau; Second Siege of Huy; Siege of Zandvliet; Siege of Zoutleeuw; Battle of Ramillies; Siege of Ostend; Siege of Ath; Battle of Oudenarde; Siege of Lille; Siege of Tournai; Battle of Malplaquet; Siege of Mons; Siege of Douai; Great Northern War; Siege of Stralsund

Willem Vleertman (1 August 1658 – 23 April 1742) was a Dutch States Army officer and engineer who played an important role in various conflicts in the late 17th and early 18th centuries. He notably participated in the Battle of Blenheim, where his reconnaissance efforts proved instrumental in securing victory. Beyond his military exploits, Vleertman contributed to engineering projects, including the establishment of postal services and infrastructure improvements, and in 1717 saved Amsterdam from a flood.

== Early military career ==
Willem Vleertman was born in Oldenzaal, the son of Frans Vleertman, who served as a rider under Captain C. Völler, and Metta van Randen or van Grande. At the age of 14, he enlisted in the military as a cadet under General Kurt Christoph von Königsmarck. In 1673, he participated in the Siege of Naarden and the Siege of Bonn in November of the same year. On 2 August 1674, he was appointed ensign and took part in the Battle of Seneffe, subsequently being promoted to lieutenant in 1676.

Following the Treaty of Nijmegen in 1678, his regiment was disbanded, and he settled as an apprentice sugar baker in Amsterdam. In 1679, he declined a captaincy offered by the Dutch West India Company, opting instead to join the foot soldiers recruited by the company to combat pirates on the Guinea coast. On 31 August 1681, he married Rebecca Beuns Mathysdr. in Amsterdam.

In 1686, the Duke of Brunswick summoned him to Hamburg to dismantle the fortifications erected there when King Christian V of Denmark threatened the city.

== Nine Years' War ==
In 1688, he accompanied William III during the Glorious Revolution and subsequently, on the orders of the king, introduced an improved postal service between the Dutch Republic and Vienna. In 1689, he carried dispatches to Obdam, the Dutch envoy in Münster. Upon his return to England, he witnessed the Williamite War in Ireland and, after the Battle of the Boyne, served as a courier for William III to convey news of the victory.

In 1691, he established a postal service from Maastricht to Brussels, through Aachen to Cologne, and in the same year served as a captain in the Dutch army in Brigadier Hol's regiment in Brabant. Here, he thwarted a French plot by pretending to collaborate with the French, for which he negotiated a sum of 400,000 lire from Marshal Duras. The scheme failed when he relayed all the French plans to William III and Everhard van Weede Dijkvelt.

In 1692, he resigned as captain and received a concession on 11 March from Johann Wilhelm, Elector Palatine, for himself and his heirs to operate stagecoaches from Düsseldorf to Düren, Urdingen, and Venlo, from Cologne to Frankfurt and Augsburg, and also from Cologne to Brussels, Xanten, and Nijmegen. However, the following year, this postal service ceased due to competition. In July 1692, he once again acted as a courier for William III, announcing to the Viennese court and the Porte that His Majesty and the States-General were offering their mediation to end the war between the two countries. In 1695, he participated in the siege and capture of Namur.

During the years 1697 and 1698, he accompanied a son of François de Vicq, mayor of Amsterdam, on a journey through the southern states of Europe. On 13 April 1700, in the service of Frederick IV, Duke of Holstein-Gottorp, he participated in the siege of the fortress of Tönningen. On 20 January 1701, he was appointed lock keeper of the Oude Kolkssluis by the Mayor of Amsterdam. In the same year, under the famous military engineer Menno van Coehoorn, he was tasked with overseeing the cutting of the Waal near Pannerden.

== War of the Spanish Succession ==
=== 1701–1703 ===
On 16 April 1702, he served under the Prince of Nassau-Saarbrücken at the Siege of Kaiserswerth. At Coehoorn's request, he was now appointed Commissioner of the Approaches in Flanders. Sent as a courier in June to the Earl of Athlone, he learned upon arrival in Breda that Nijmegen had been overrun by the French. However, the rumor turned out to be false, and he safely reached the city. Here, he was accused by the people of being a French spy. The military council acquitted him, and the main instigators of the riot were sentenced to publish in newspapers and on the streets that all the rumors they had spread about Vleertman were slanderous. He also witnessed the conquest of Middelburg, Venlo, Stevensweert, Roermond, and Liège, where on 14 October, with 25 volunteers, he was the first to breach the defenses, while also participating in the capture of the Castle (23) and the Carthusian Monastery (30 October). In March 1703, he was with the Dutch troops near Venlo, and later that year, at the Siege of Bonn. Here, General François Nicolas Fagel tasked him with cutting off the water supply to the city, which he succeeded in doing, and he was put in charge of the artillery and siege works on the left flank. An attempt to bribe him failed, for which he received a gift of 25 ducats from the Elector Palatine. On 8 May, he narrowly escaped injury in an explosion of gunpowder at an ammunition depot near Bonn, which killed 17 men. In August, he participated in the Siege of Huy. In September, at the Siege of Limbourg, his cool-headedness extinguished a fire in the arsenal.

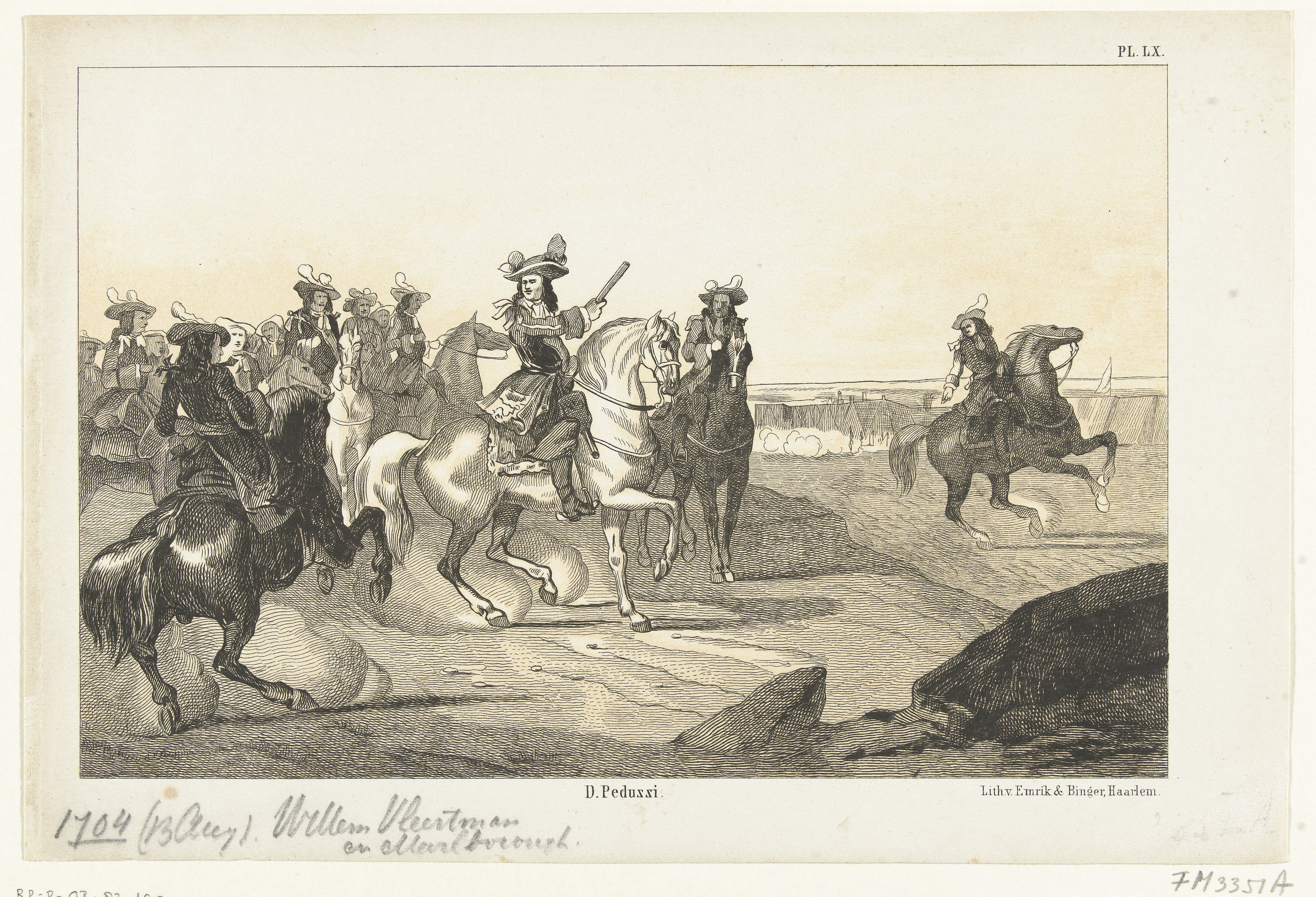
Willem Vleertman reports to the Duke of Marlborough on his reconnaissance of the terrain between Blenheim and Höchstädt..

=== 1704 ===
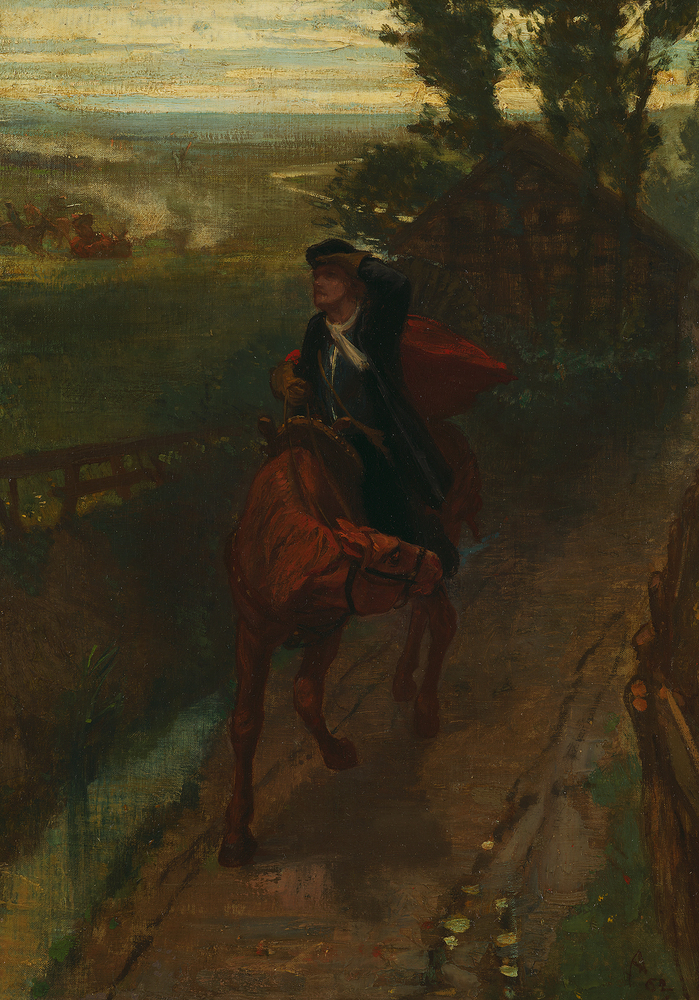
Willem Vleertman scouts the marshy terrain near Blenheim at the risk of his own life.

In February 1704, he declined an appointment as quartermaster-general of the English troops on the Danube. Shortly thereafter, he was tasked with inspecting the war depots in Huy, Liège, and other places. In May, he joined the army under Marlborough and was present at the Battle of Schellenberg. Marlborough joined up with Prince Eugene at the plain near Blindheim and Höchstädt to face the French army which had taken up a strong position there.

Vleertman had an argument early in the morning of 13 August with two local nobles in the presence of the Duke of Marlborough and Prince Eugene. The nobles disputed with Vleertman that it was impossible for the army to pass through the marshy areas that lay before it. Vleertman maintained the opposite. A heated argument ensued. To settle the dispute, Vleertman mounted his horse and rode through those areas to the stream that ran in front of the enemy's army. Seeing him and thinking he was a deserter, the enemy signaled to him to go to a certain water mill to cross the stream. Vleertman turned his horse back to his camp, and realizing they were deceived, the enemies fired at him, but he escaped the danger due to the speed of his horse. His advice was decisive and led to the Battle of Blenheim that ended in a great victory.

Later that campaign he was present at the Siege of Landau. Vleertman conveyed the joyful news of the campaign to The Hague and was rewarded with a gold chain. In November, he also reported the surrender of Landau to The Hague, and in December, the conquest of Trarbach.

=== 1705–1713 ===
In 1705, Vleertman was once again with the Dutch army, witnessing the second Allied siege of Huy in July and participating in actions at Gheete, Diest, and Aarschot. He followed the headquarters to Ohain and Wavre in July, and in September, was at ZoutLeeuw and shortly thereafter at Aarschot. In October, he witnessed the siege and capture of Zandvliet, after which he accompanied the army to Turnhout. By January 1706, he was already in the field again, at Maastricht; on 26 May, he brought news of the victory at Ramillies to The Hague, and on 1 June, he went to Düsseldorf on the orders of Daniël van Dopff to report. In July, he participated in the Siege of Ostend and in August, brought the joyous news to The Hague that Menen had been taken, and in September, the conquest of Dendermonde, after which he attended the Siege of Ath.

Shortly thereafter, he resumed his duties as a lock-keeper and remained in Amsterdam in 1707. The following year, he was back in the field and in July, he was the messenger of the joyful news of the victory at Oudenaarde. In July, he went on a reconnaissance mission to Picardy under Brigadier Dewits. In August, under his supervision, the trenches were dug at the Siege of Lille, where he narrowly escaped death when a mine collapsed. In October, he was once again tasked with building bridges over the moats at the siege of Aire. In 1709, he was with the Allied army at the Siege of Tournai, the Battle of Malplaquet and played an active role in the Siege of Mons.

In 1710, the Burgomasters of Amsterdam allowed him to undertake another "Field Expedition," and he proved his skills as a capable engineer during the sieges of Douai, Béthune, St. Venant, and Aire. In April 1711, he was with Marlborough at Bouchain, and in June, he provided ammunition to Menen and Kortrijk, where he was captured by the French, but only for a short time: soon after, by constructing a road through a marsh near Marchiennes, he saved the army from encirclement by the French. He then devoted himself again to improving the postal service, including that between Nijmegen and Cologne.

== Later life ==
After the Peace of Utrecht, he traveled to England in the retinue of the Princess of Wales. In 1714, he served King Frederick William I of Prussia and in 1715, during the Siege of Stralsund, he was in charge of supplying the besieging artillery and building a bridge of gabions over the moat. After enduring a severe illness, carefully nursed by the king's personal physician, he returned to Amsterdam in 1716.

By capturing the renowned Georg Heinrich von Görtz, minister of Charles XII of Sweden, on 20 February 1717 in Arnhem, he once again demonstrated his promptness, while in December 1717, he prevented Amsterdam from flooding by installing a cistern on the Haarlemmerdijk when it was threatened by the surging seawater. In 1718, he conducted an inspection with the surveyor Maurits Walraven of the sea gates at Texel, Eierland, and Vlieland. In 1721, he again acted as a courier, delivering a portrait of George I of Great Britain to Arnhem, which the king offered to the city government as thanks for arresting Görtz. In 1728, he greatly served Dutch trade by preventing the establishment of a competing East India Company in Altona, Hamburg.

== Sources ==
- Blok, P.J.; Molhuysen, P.C. (1914). "Vleertman, Willem". Nieuw Nederlandsch biografisch woordenboek. Deel 3.
- Wadder, Ide de (1742). Levensgevallen van Willem Vleertman, Commissaris van ... de Heren Staaten Generaal der Verenigde Nederlanden [Life Events of Willem Vleertman, Commissioner of ... the Lords States General of the United Netherlands] (in Dutch). by Ide de Wadder.
