= Kessel (river) =

River in Germany

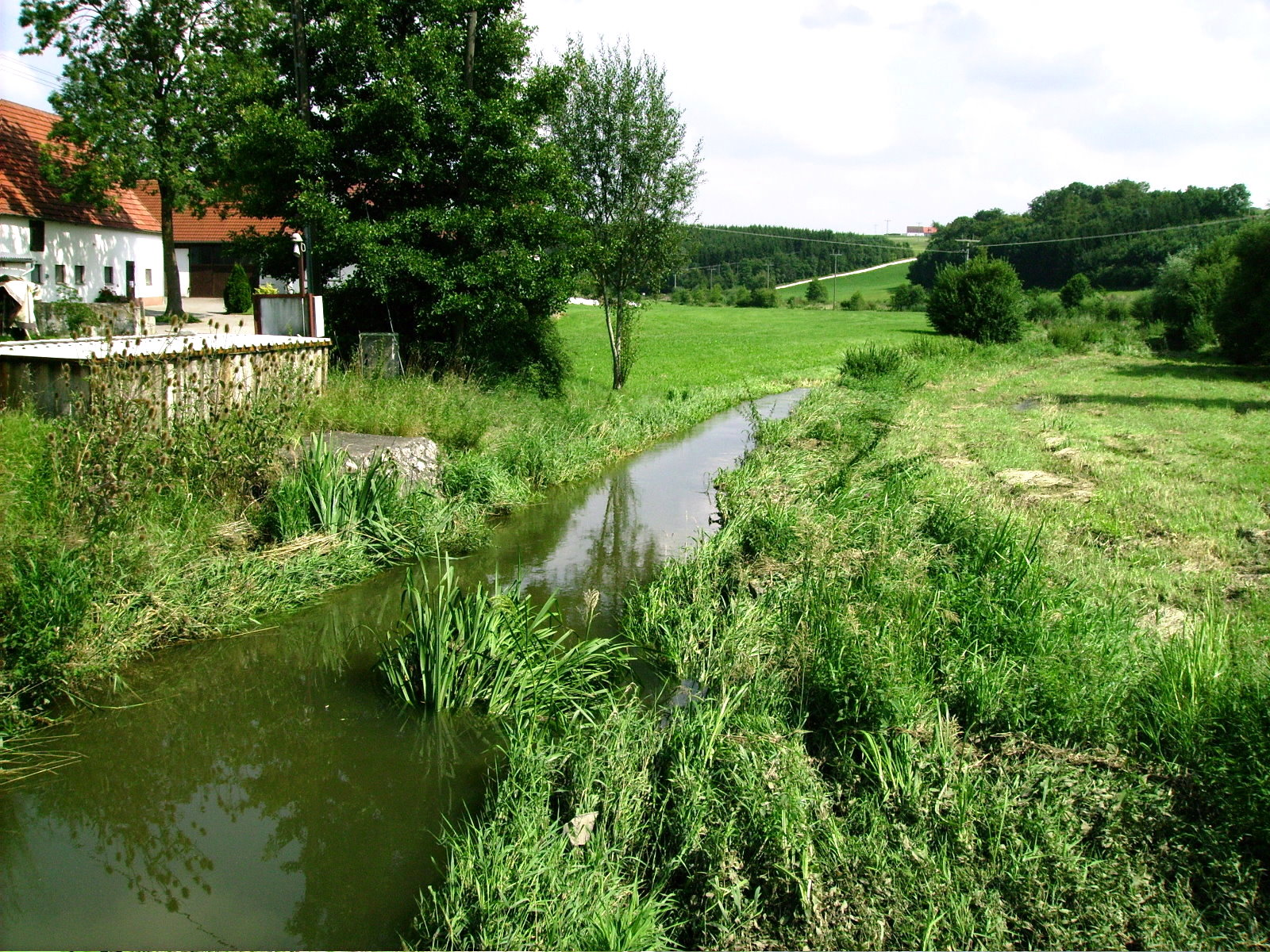
- The Kessel at Thalheim (a part of Bissingen)

Location
- Country: Germany
- State: Bavaria

Physical characteristics
- Mouth
  - location: Danube
  - coordinates: 48.7060°N 10.7748°E
- Length: 40.9 km (25.4 mi)
- Basin size: 175 km^{2} (68 sq mi)

Basin features
- Progression: Danube→ Black Sea

Kessel is a river of Bavaria, Germany. It flows into the Danube near Donauwörth.

== See also ==
- List of rivers of Bavaria
