= Judocus de Vos =

Flemish weaver (1661–1734)

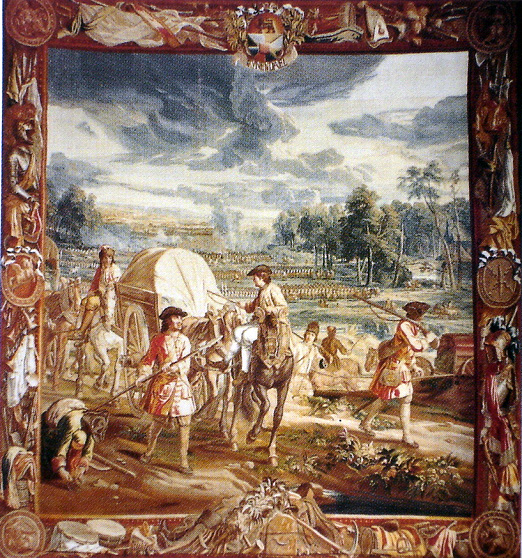
Battle of Wynendael after design by Lambert de Hondt (II), Blenheim Palace

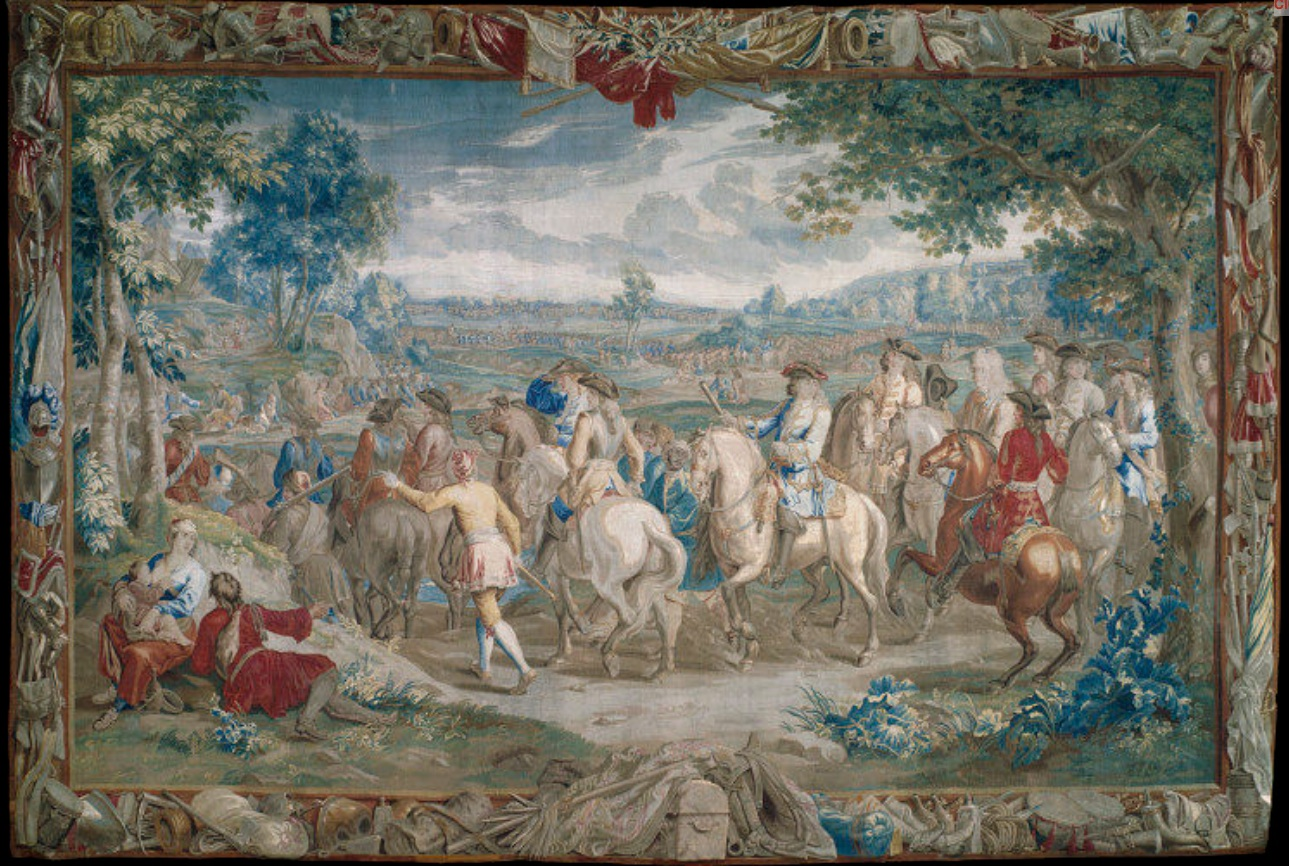
The March, after design by Philipp De Hondt

Woven in the workshop of Judocus de Vos about 1710 after design by David Teniers the Younger; probably made for the upper class market in Europe and Britain

Judocus de Vos (1661–1734) was a Flemish weaver, son of the weaver Marcus de Vos. he was apprenticed to his father and after his death he took over and expanded the weaving mill. He produced many tapestries, many commissioned to depict events from the War of the Spanish Succession.

== Main tapestries ==
- 1699–1700, 29 tapestries with New Testament for the St John's Co-Cathedral in La Valetta (Malta)
- 1705 leader of the largest workshop in Brussels, having 12 weaving machines with about 35 weavers
- 1707–1717 tapestries for the Blenheim Palace of John Churchill, Duke of Marlborough
- 1712–1724 eight tapestries with Telemachos stories for Adam Franciscus, Duke of Schwarzenberg (5 pieces saved at the castle Hluboká Castle in Bohemia, 1 piece in Kunsthistorisches Museum in Vienna; signed J.D.VOS and Brussels' coat-of-arms between initials B/B.
- 1710–1715 six tapestries Months for the Lobkowicz Palace in Prague, since 1927 in the Czernin Palace in Prague.
- 1712–1721 twelve tapestries with The History of the Conquest of Tunis for the royal castle of the Holy Roman Emperor Charles VI in Vienna; now in the Kunsthistorisches Museum Vienna .
- 1718–1724 six tapestries Months of the Year - Martial Arts for the Saxon Elector Augustus the Strong; 1 piece in Victoria and Albert Museum in London, 1 with Naval battle at the New castle in Oberschleissheim (nearby Muenchen).

== Bibliography ==
- Jeri Bapisola, Threads of History: The Tapestries of Blenheim Palace. (Lightmoor Press, 2005).
- Koenraad Brossens, Brussels Tapestry Producer Judocus de Vos (1661/62-1734). New Data and Design Attributions. Studies in the Decorative Arts, vol. IX, no. 2 (2002).
- Alan Wace, The Marlborough Tapestries at Blenheim Palace. (London, 1968).
- Jarmila BLAŽKOVÁ, Deux tentures des mois à Prague, inː Artes textiles, Bijdragen tot de geschiedenis van de tapijt-, borduur- en textielkunst, X, Gent, (1981), p. 203-220
