= Siege of Landau (1704) =

Siege during the War of the Spanish Succession

- Part of War of the Spanish Succession
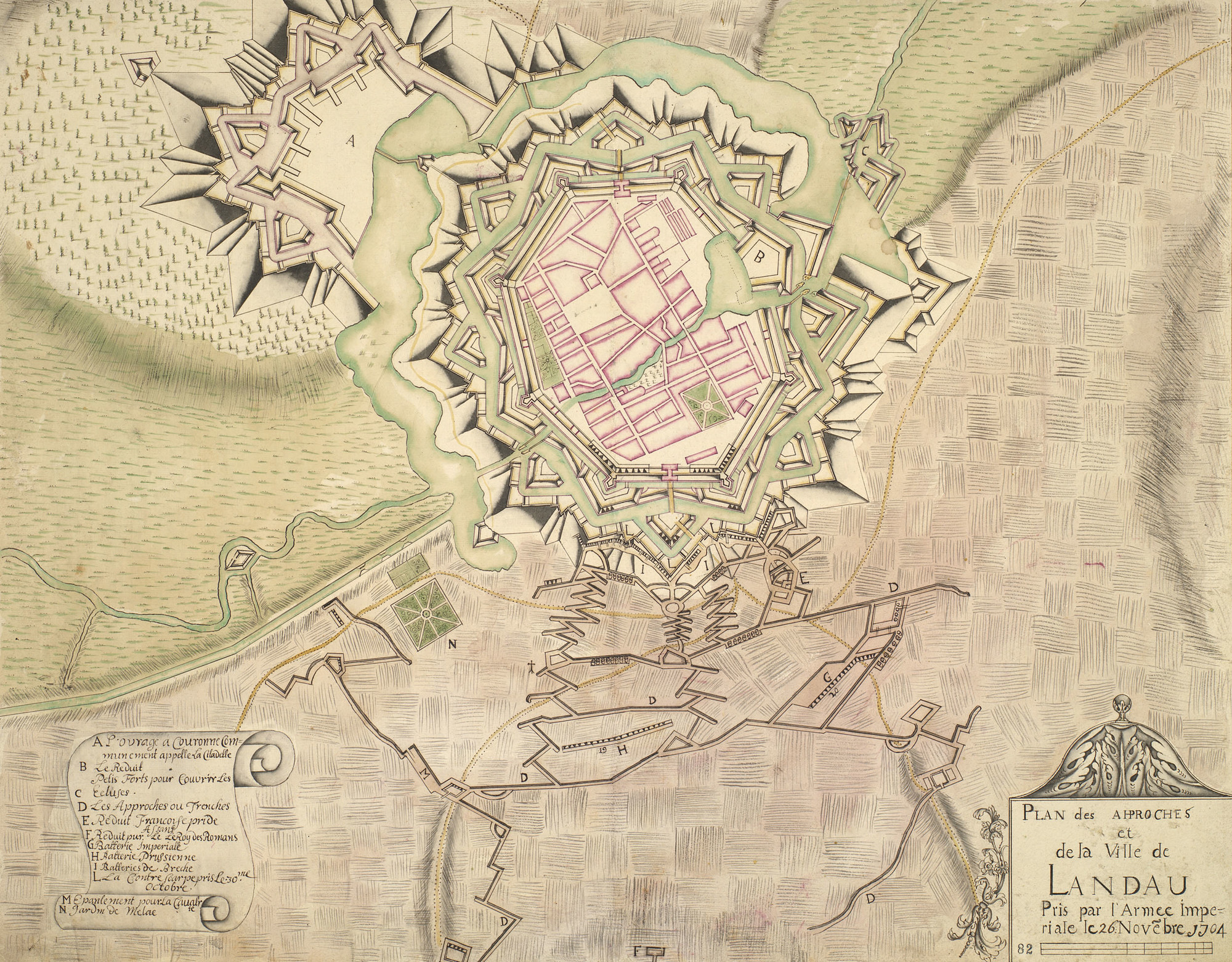
- Map showing the fortifications and siegeworks of 1704
Date	9 September – 25 November 1704
Location	Landau, Rhineland-Palatinate, Germany 49°11′49″N 08°06′56″E
Result	Allied victory

Belligerents
Grand Alliance	France

Commanders and leaders
Joseph, King of the Romans; Louis of Baden	Yrieix Masgontier de Laubanie

Strength
>70,000 (incl. covering forces)	7,000

Casualties and losses
9,322	2,600–5,000

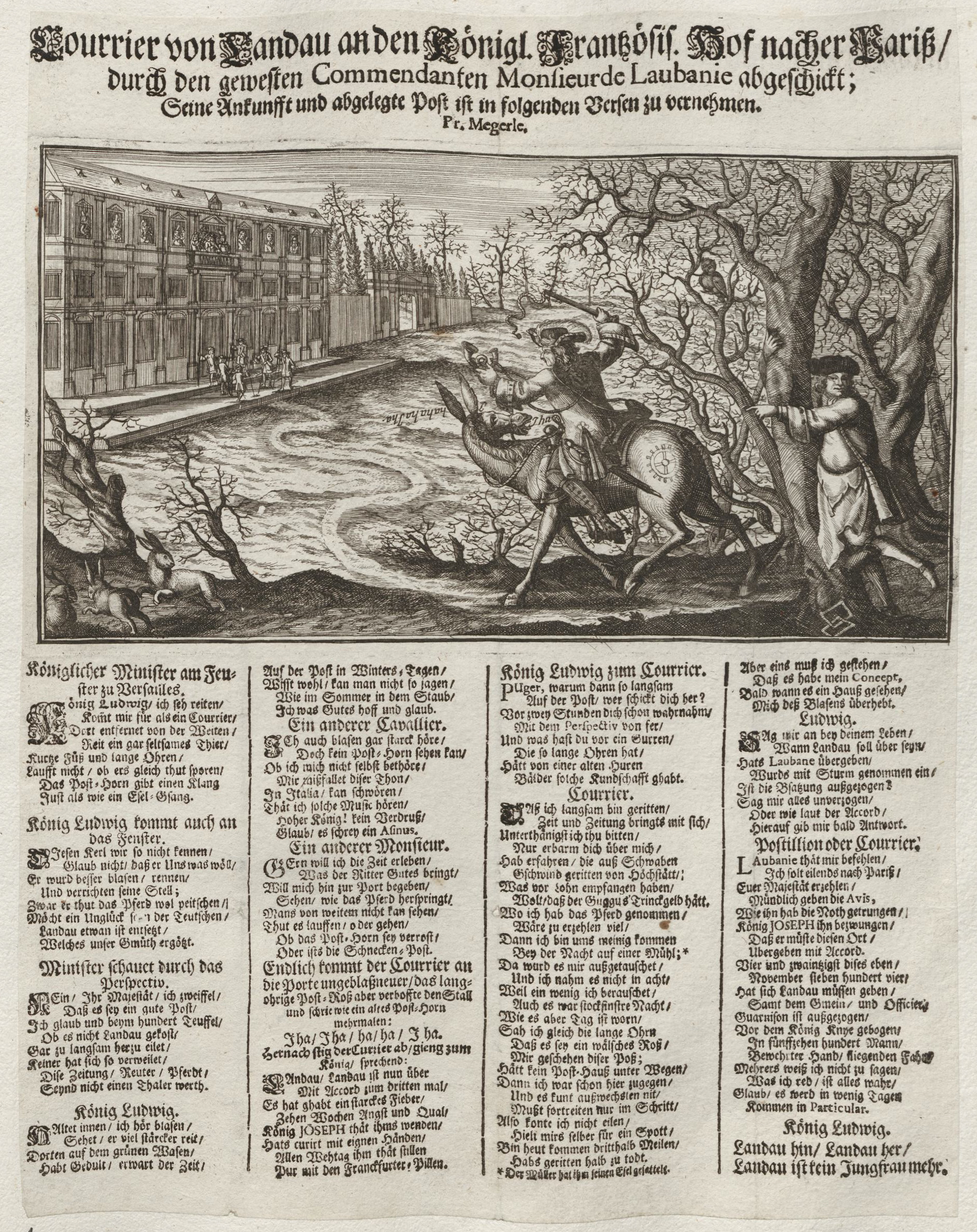
A courier from Landau arrives at the court of Louis XIV during the siege of 1704.

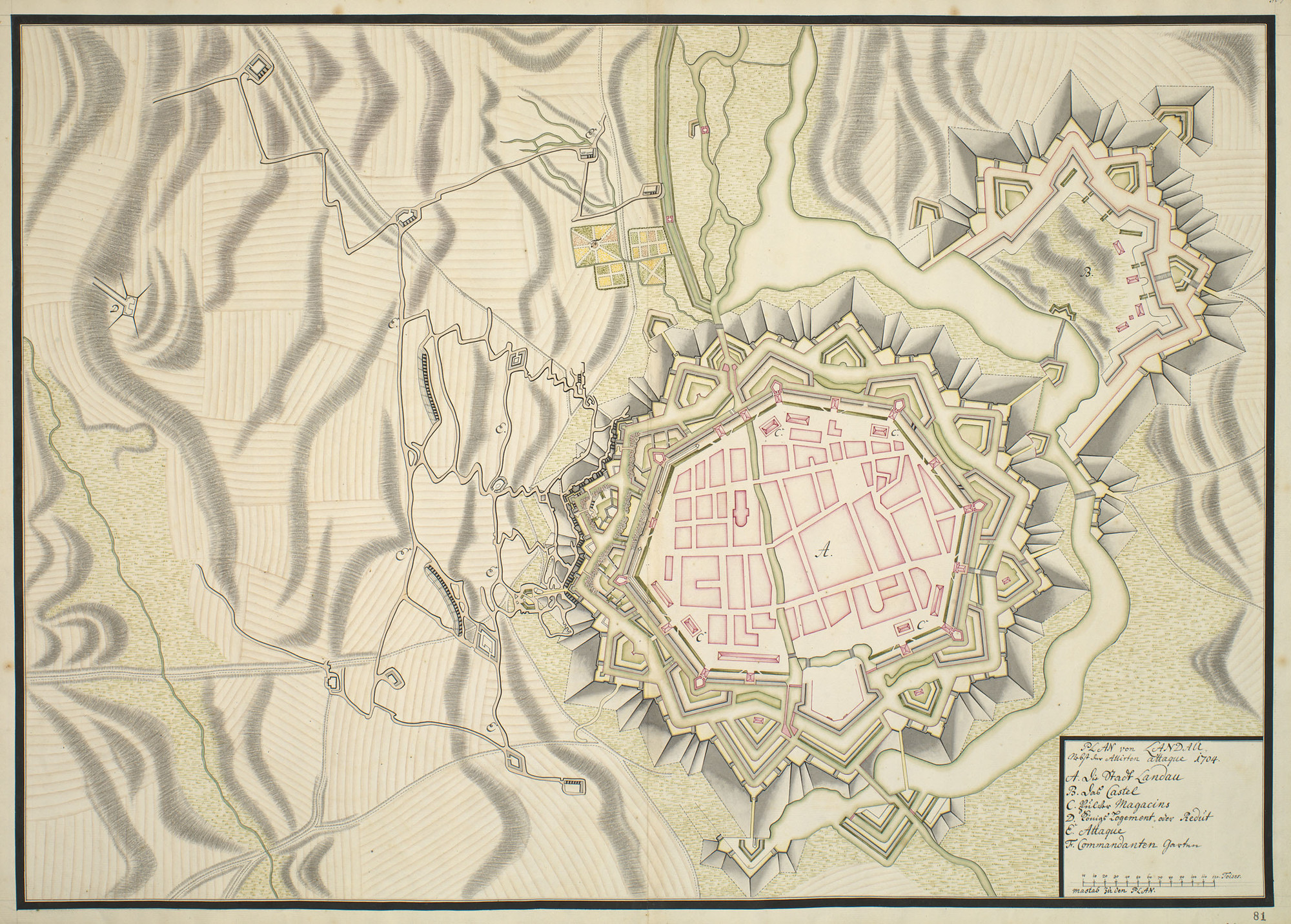
Another map showing the fortifications and siegeworks of 1704

The siege of Landau of 1704 was the third of four such sieges during the War of the Spanish Succession. It lasted 77 days from 9 September to 25 November 1704, when the French garrison surrendered to the forces of the Grand Alliance.

Following the Allied victory at the Battle of Blenheim on 13 August 1704, the remnant of the French Army of Alsace under Ferdinand de Marsin withdrew towards Strasbourg while the Army of Flanders under the Duc de Villeroy covered its retreat. Villeroy reinforced the garrison of Landau with six infantry battalions and some engineers and artillery officers—about 2,000 men—and provided it with provisions and munitions. The garrison, which had about 5,000 men before reinforcement, was commanded by Lieutenant General Yrieix Masgontier de Laubanie.

The Imperial Army—including Austrian and Prussian contingents and Kreistruppen—under Margrave Louis of Baden numbered some 40,000 at the start of the campaign in June. During the Battle of Blenheim, it besieged Ingolstadt without success. While the forces of the Duke of Marlborough and Prince Eugene of Savoy pursued Villeroy south and took up covering positions on the river Lauter, preventing any chance of relief for the fortress, Baden began the investment of Landau by digging trenches on 9 September. The trenches were opened on 13 September. As Marlborough had marched without the siege train, the besiegers were relatively short of artillery. This was augmented, however, by that captured at the fall of Ulm on 10 September, which probably arrived on 20 September. Thereafter, the Allied method was one of "massive bombardment" in the style of Menno van Coehoorn.

On 28 September, Joseph, King of the Romans, arrived and took nominal command of the siege. The rate of bombardment increased in October, while the defenders launched several sorties to disrupt the sappers. On 10 October, Laubanie was blinded during a bombardment, but remained in command. By November, the locks by which the defenders could control the flooding of certain ditches by the river Queich were destroyed and Marlborough had moved from his covering position to attack certain fortresses on the Moselle. On 23 November, following the loss of the covered way, Laubanie held a conference with his officers. The chamade was beaten and the garrison surrendered on 25 November. The garrison marched out the next day. The Imperial Army entered on 28 November.

The defenders inflicted severe casualties on the attackers, who suffered 9,322 casualties of all types. At the capitulation, the garrison had between 2,600 and 5,000 killed, wounded or sick.

== Works cited ==
- Churchill, Winston S. (1947) [1934]. Marlborough: His Life and Times. Vol. 2. George G. Harrap.
- Clare, Sheldon (2010). Attack and Defense at the 1704 Siege of Landau: An Analysis (PDF) (Capstone paper). Norwich University. Archived (PDF) from the original on 2023-04-04.
- Duffy, Christopher (1985). The Fortress in the Age of Vauban and Frederick the Great, 1660–1789. Routledge.
- Lynn, John A. (2013) [1999]. The Wars of Louis XIV, 1667–1714. Routledge.
- Ostwald, Jamel (2007). Vauban under Siege: Engineering Efficiency and Martial Vigor in the War of the Spanish Succession. Brill.
- Wines, Roger Andrew (1961). The Franconian Reichskreis and the Holy Roman Empire in the War of the Spanish Succession (PhD dissertation). Columbia University.
