= Hochstadt =

Hochstadt can refer to three battles:

- Battle of Höchstädt (1703)
- Battle of Blenheim (1704) - frequently referred to in Europe as the Battle of Höchstädt.
- Battle of Höchstädt (1800)

It also the name of different places in Germany:

- Hochstadt, Rhineland-Palatinate, in the district Südliche Weinstraße
- Hochstadt am Main, in Bavaria
- a subdivision of Weßling, in Bavaria
- Hochstadt, Maintal, a district of the city of Maintal, Hesse

and places with similar names:

- Hochstaden, a medieval county in Rhineland, near Cologne.
- Höchstädt an der Donau, in the district of Dillingen, Bavaria (site of the battles in 1703, 1704 and 1800)
- Höchstädt im Fichtelgebirge, in the district of Wunsiedel, Bavaria
- Höchstadt, in the Erlangen-Höchstadt district, Bavaria
- Hochstatt, in Alsace, France
