= Battle of Höchstädt (1800) =

1800 battle of the War of the Second Coalition

- Part of the War of the Second Coalition
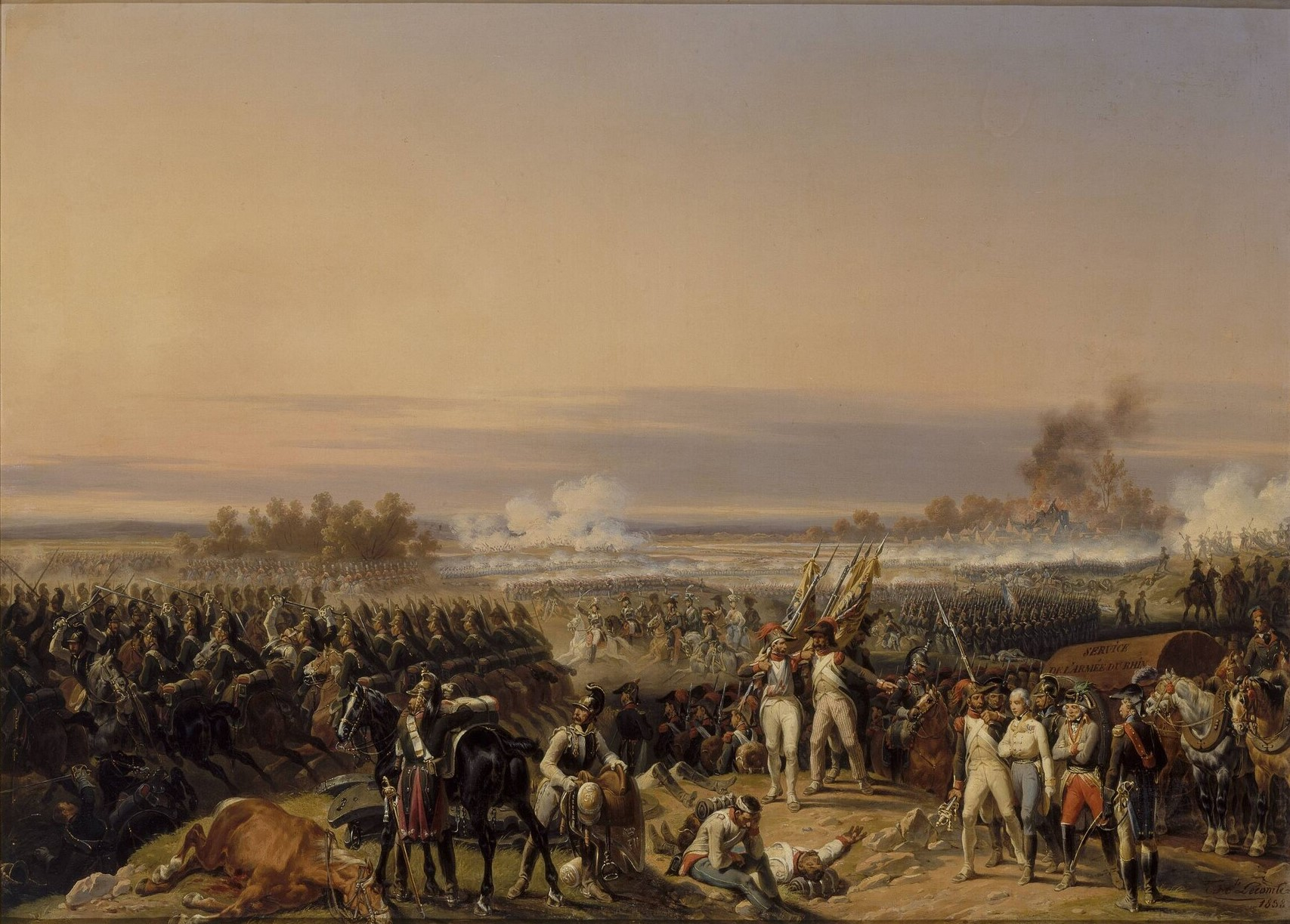
- Battle of Hochstett, 19 June 1800; Hippolyte Lecomte, 1838
Date	19 June 1800
Location	Höchstädt, and surrounding villages of Blindheim, Dillingen, and Donauwörth, in present day Germany 48°36′0″N 10°33′0″E
Result	French victory

Belligerents
France	(Holy Roman Empire) Austria

Commanders and leaders
Jean Victor Marie Moreau	Pál Kray

Strength
60,000	30,000

Casualties and losses
approximately 2,000	5,000 dead, wounded and captured

War of the Second Coalition:
Austria
The color black indicates the current battle.

The Battle of Höchstädt was fought on 19 June 1800 on the north bank of the Danube near Höchstädt, and resulted in a French victory under General Jean Victor Marie Moreau against the Austrians under Baron Pál Kray. The Austrians were subsequently forced back into the fortress town of Ulm. Instead of attacking the heavily fortified, walled city, which would result in massive losses of personnel and time, Moreau dislodged Kray's supporting forces defending the Danube passage further east. As a line of retreat eastward disappeared, Kray quickly abandoned Ulm, and withdrew into Bavaria. This opened the Danube pathway toward Vienna.

The Danube passage connecting Ulm, Donauwörth, Ingolstadt and Regensburg had strategic importance in the ongoing competition for European hegemony between France and the Holy Roman Empire; the army that commanded the Danube, especially its passage through Württemberg and Bavaria, could command access to the important cities of Munich and the seat of Habsburg authority: Vienna. The result of the battle was the opposite of what had occurred on those same fields in 1704 during the War of the Spanish Succession, when the Second Battle of Höchstädt had ensured the safety of Vienna and opened the pathway into France for the allied English and Austrian forces.

== Background ==
Although the First Coalition forces achieved several initial victories at Verdun, Kaiserslautern, Neerwinden, Mainz, Amberg and Würzburg, the efforts of Napoleon Bonaparte in northern Italy pushed Austrian forces back and resulted in the negotiation of the Peace of Leoben (17 April 1797) and the subsequent Treaty of Campo Formio (October 1797). This treaty proved difficult to administer. Austria was slow to give up some of the Venetian territories. A Congress convened at Rastatt for the purposes of deciding which southwestern German states would be mediatised to compensate the dynastic houses for territorial losses, but was unable to make any progress. Supported by French republican forces, Swiss insurgents staged several uprisings, ultimately causing the overthrow of the Swiss Confederation after 18 months of civil war. By early 1799, the French Directory had become impatient with stalling tactics employed by Austria. An uprising in Naples raised further alarms, and recent gains in Switzerland suggested the timing was fortuitous for the French to venture on another campaign in northern Italy and southwestern Germany.

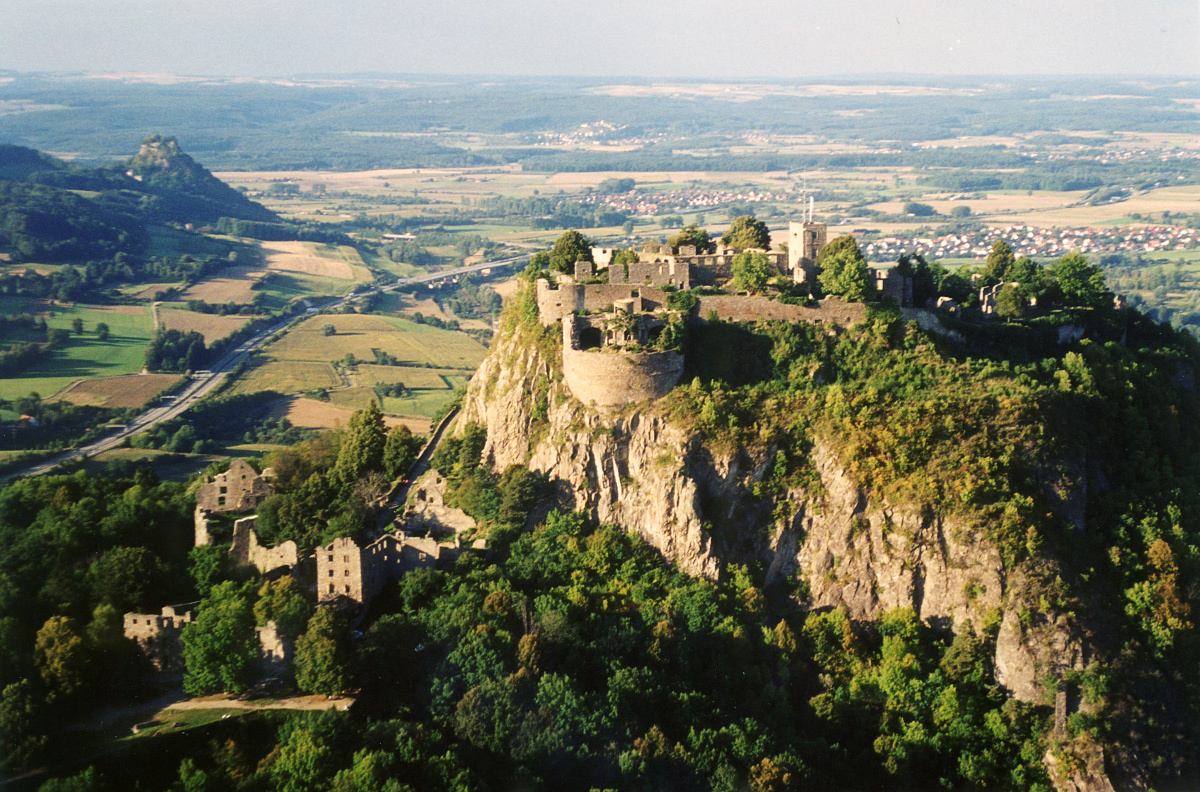
The Battles of Stockach and Engen in May 1800, followed by a larger battle at Meßkirch, followed the Hohentwiel capitulation to the French

At the beginning of 1800, the armies of France and Austria faced each other across the Rhine. Feldzeugmeister Pál Kray led approximately 120,000 troops. In addition to his Austrian regulars, his force included 12,000 men from the Electorate of Bavaria, 6,000 troops from the Duchy of Württemberg, 5,000 soldiers of low quality from the Archbishopric of Mainz, and 7,000 militiamen from the County of Tyrol. Of these, 25,000 men were deployed east of Lake Constance (Bodensee) to protect the Vorarlberg. Kray posted his main body of 95,000 soldiers in the L-shaped angle where the Rhine changes direction from a westward flow along the northern border of Switzerland to a northward flow along the eastern border of France. Unwisely, Kray set up his main magazine at Stockach, near the northwestern end of Lake Constance, only a day's march from French-held Switzerland.

General of Division Jean Victor Marie Moreau commanded a modestly-equipped army of 137,000 French troops. Of these, 108,000 troops were available for field operations while the other 29,000 watched the Swiss border and held the Rhine fortresses. Napoleon Bonaparte offered a plan of operations based on outflanking the Austrians by a push from Switzerland, but Moreau declined to follow it. Rather, Moreau planned to cross the Rhine near Basel where the river swung to the north. A French column would distract Kray from Moreau's true intentions by crossing the Rhine from the west. Bonaparte wanted Claude Lecourbe's corps to be detached to Italy after the initial battles, but Moreau had other plans. Through a series of complicated maneuvers in which he flanked, double flanked, and reflanked Kray's army, Moreau's forces lay on the eastern slope of the Black Forest, while portions of Kray's army was still guarding the passes on the other side. Battles at Engen and Stockach were fought on 3 May 1800 between Moreau's and Kray's armies. The fighting near Engen resulted in a stalemate with heavy losses on both sides. However, while the two main armies were engaged at Engen, Lecourbe captured Stockach from its Austrian defenders under Joseph Louis, Prince of Lorraine-Vaudémont. The loss of this main supply base at Stockach compelled Kray to retreat north to Meßkirch, where his army enjoyed a more favorable defensive position. It also meant, however, that any retreat by Kray into Austria via Switzerland and the Vorarlberg was cut off.

On 4 and 5 May, the French launched repeated and fruitless assaults on the Meßkirch. At nearby Krumbach, where the Austrians also had the superiority of position and force, the 1st Demi-Brigade took the village and the heights around it, which gave them a commanding aspect over Meßkirch. Subsequently, Kray withdrew his forces to Sigmaringen, followed closely by the French. Fighting at nearby Biberach an der Ris ensued on 9 May; action principally consisted of the 25,000 man-strong French "Center", commanded by Laurent de Gouvion Saint-Cyr against a Habsburg force of similar size. Again, on 10 May, the Austrians withdrew with heavy losses, this time to Ulm.

== Order of battle ==
=== French ===
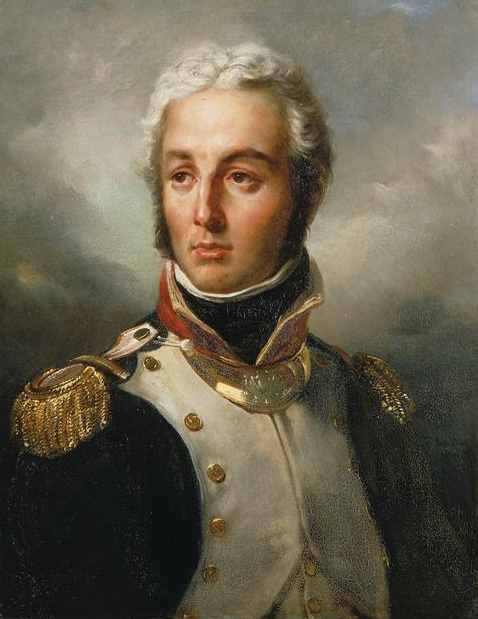
Jean Victor Moreau commanded the French Army of the Rhine.

Sources are unclear which forces were present. Certainly, it was approximately 40,000 troops, and possibly 60,000, well above the 10,000–30,000 total Austrian and Württemberg numbers. Contemporary accounts place the 94th Demi-brigade at the center of action in Gremheim, a village between Höchstädt and Donauwörth, about half a mile (800m) from Blindheim. This suggests the presence of General Claude Jacques Lecourbe's Corps, including the forces of generals Laval, Molitor, Jardon, and VanDamme. This is also confirmed in an extract of Moreau's dispatch to the French Minister of War, published in the London Chronicle, 10 June 1800. "The 6th chasseurs, 13th cavalry, 4th hussars and 11th chasseurs distinguished themselves in this affair. The rest of the division, and that of LeClere, passed rapidly the Danube... General Grenier was equally well prepared." In his Art of War, Baron Antoine-Henri Jomini also refers to General Dedon-Duclos as having a key role in the French success at Höchstädt.

=== Austrian ===
The Allied force included approximately 20,000 Habsburg regulars and Württemberg's contingent of troops raised for the war:

- FZM Count Anton Sztáray, commanding
  - FML von Ferdinand August Freiherr von Hügel's Württemberg Contingent, including
    - General Beulwitz, Infantry Regiment Beulwitz, Seckendorf and Seeger (1 battalion each)
    - Füss-Jägers (three companies);
    - Garde du Corps (1 squadron)
    - 3 squadrons of light horse
    - Contingent regiments commanded by von Zobel, von Mylius, and von Oberniz (1 battalion each)
    - 20 guns
  - Austrian regulars
    - Royal Regiment Albert, Number 3 (6 squadrons)
    - Hohenzollern Number 8 (6 squadrons)
    - Hussar Regiment Vécsey Number 4 (8 squadron)
    - Blankenstein Number 6 (8 squadron)

Total Austrian-Württemberg force: 20,000 men.

== Dispositions ==
Kray assumed that Moreau would follow him to the fortress at Ulm, on the Danube, where he arrayed most of the Austrian regulars and Württemberg contingent and supplies. This position gave him ready access to both shores of the river and effectively, he assumed, blocked Moreau's path into Bavaria. At several points east on the Danube, he posted modest forces to protect the river crossings there, and to dismantle, if necessary, the stone bridges across the river. Several bridges crossed the river between Ulm and Donauwörth, which lay downstream to the east, and each presented a strategic point at which to rupture Kray's potential line of march into Bavaria: Leipheim, Günzburg, Gundelfingen, Lauingen, Dillingen, Höchstädt, Gremheim, and Elchingen.

According to Moreau's narrative, he intended to force Kray to either come to battle outside Ulm, or to abandon the city. Ulm obstructed unfettered French access into Bavaria, and blocked the main force of the Army of the Rhine. To keep his forces secure, accepted military wisdom required that Moreau secure at least half of the crossings of the river, and that his troops follow a line of march perpendicular to the river. This would prevent them from having to fight a battle (or a skirmish) with their backs to the river. The more bridges his force could take, the more secure the approach on Ulm.

== General engagement ==
Moreau appeared to march toward Ulm, which lay some twenty miles east of Sigmaringen and Biberach an der Ris, where his army and Kray's had engaged a few days earlier. Instead of striking directly at the well-fortified and supplied city, however, his force suddenly veered to the east and struck at the smaller forces posted between Ulm and Donauwörth. Lecourbe first secured posts in Landsberg and Augsburg, and left sufficient rearguard troops to protect himself from Prince Reuss-Plauen, who remained in the Tyrol, guarding mountain access to Vienna. He then approached Dettingen, Blindheim (Blenheim) and Höchstädt. The Corps of General Grenier has been posted with their right flank to the Danube and Gunzburg, and their left flank at Kinsdorf. General Richepanse protected both shores of the Iller, covering the road from Ulm south to Memmingen, and secured communication with Switzerland; there, he withstood considerable skirmishing with the Austrians. Three divisions of reserve remained at the hamlets of Kamlack and Mindel, to support the attack made by General Lecourbe on Ulm, in a case it should succeed, or Grenier's attack upon Gunzburg, in case Lecourbe should not succeed.

Lecourbe made several feints on the bridge at Dillingheim, but his reconnaissance suggested instead that he focus on the bridges at Gremsheim, Blindheim and Höchstädt, which he did the next day. A small group of 80 or so men from the 94th Demi-brigade managed a spectacular crossing of the river. After stripping their clothing and weapons, and loading them into a small raft, the naked men swam the river, pulling their raft behind them. Once reaching the other side, they took possession of several guns and some ammunition, wood, and materials. Here they held their position until some artillery men managed to scramble across the wreck of the bridge at Gremsheim and support them. The pioneers and bridge builders reconstructed the bridges under Austrian fire, allowing the remainder of the 94th to cross the river. This accomplishment seemed to mark the turning point of the action, at least it did to Moreau, who mentioned it at length in his dispatch. A full Austrian corps maintained a stand at Höchstädt, but were dislodged by repeated attacks of carabiners, cuirassiers and hussars, who took about 2,000 of the Austrians and Würtembergers as prisoners, along with some cannons and standards.

== Aftermath ==
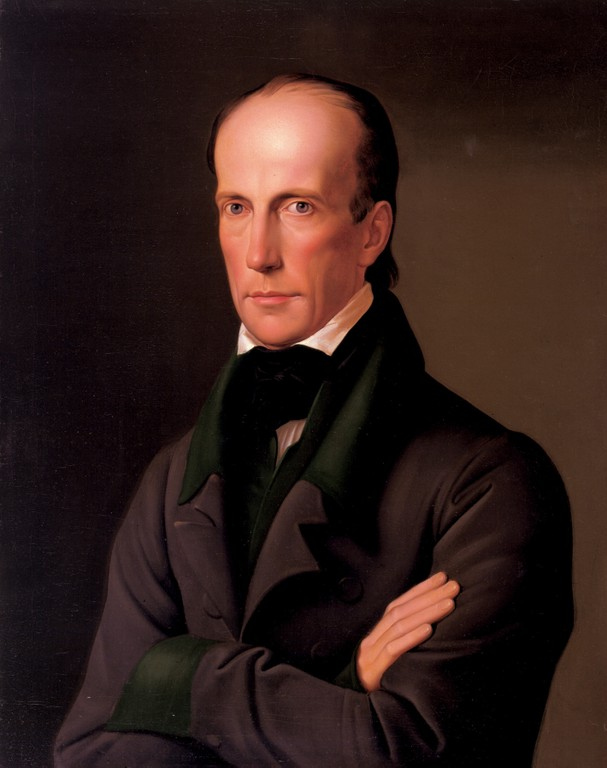
Emperor Francis II replaced Paul Kray (1735–1804) with his brother, Archduke John (above), after the Kray's losses in the Danube campaign.

Once the French had secured the downstream shores of the Danube, Kray had no choice but to evacuate his corps from Ulm, leaving only a small garrison behind. The French invested the fortress at Ulm immediately, and on the 20th, the 6th Chasseurs captured a convoy of 300 wagons loaded with grain. A few days later, a general armistice halted all fighting. Emperor Francis II dismissed Pál Kray and appointed his brother, the 18-year-old Archduke John, to command the Austrian army. To bolster the inexperienced archduke, the Emperor named Franz von Lauer as deputy commander and Oberst (Colonel) Franz von Weyrother as chief of staff.

The campaign culminating in Kray's evacuation of Ulm was one of Moreau's most resounding triumphs. Napoleon Bonaparte had given Moreau specific instructions about the conduct of the campaign, all of which Moreau had ignored. Regardless, their combined efforts damaged Habsburg military operations. In early 1800, while Moreau wrecked Austrian defenses in Germany, Massena and Desaix ran into stiff Austrian offensives in Northern Italy. Napoleon brought in the reserve corps and defeated the Austrians at Marengo. The battle near Höchstädt, five days after the Austrian failure at Marengo, allowed the French to take Munich. The combined efforts forced the Habsburgs to accept an armistice, which ended hostilities for the rest of the summer, but the French extracted massive levies on the Bavarians. Despite these significant losses—both of them decisive—the Austrians were reluctant to accept disadvantageous peace terms. In mid-November, the French ended the truce and Moreau inflicted another significant and decisive defeat at Hohenlinden, on 3 December 1800. The subsequent Peace of Lunéville stripped Austria of much of her Italian territories, obliged the Habsburgs to recognize the French satellites in the Low Countries, Switzerland, and northern Italy, and laid the groundwork for the mediatization of the small independent ecclesiastical and secular imperial polities by the duchies of Baden and Württemberg, and the Electorate of Bavaria.

== See also ==
- Ulm Campaign 1805
- Battle of Blenheim also called Second Battle of Höchstädt
- First Battle of Höchstädt

== Sources ==
=== Books and encyclopedia ===
- Arnold, James R. Marengo & Hohenlinden. Barnsley, South Yorkshire, UK: Pen & Sword, 2005. ISBN 978-0967098500
- Barnes, Gregory Fremont. Napoleon Bonaparte. Osprey Publishing, 2012. ISBN 978-0340569115
- Blanning, Timothy. The French Revolutionary Wars, New York, Oxford University Press, 1996. ISBN 978-0340569115
- Clausewitz, Carl von (2021). The Coalition Crumbles, Napoleon Returns: The 1799 Campaign in Italy and Switzerland, Volume 2. Trans and ed. Nicholas Murray and Christopher Pringle. Lawrence, Kansas: University Press of Kansas. ISBN 978-0700630349
- Eggenberger, David. "Höchstädt II", An Encyclopedia of Battles, Dover Publications, 2014. ISBN 978-0486249131
- Herold, J. Christopher. The Age of Napoleon. Houghton Mifflin Company, 1963. ISBN 978-0618154616
- History of the Wars of the French Revolution: Including Sketches of the Civil History of Great Britain and France, from the Revolutionary Movements, 1788, to the Restoration of a General Peace, 1815, Kuhl, France, 1820.
- Jomini, Antoine-Henri (Baron). The Art of War,Wilder Publications, 2008, p. 173. Originally published in English in 1862. ISBN 978-1934255582
- Rothenberg, Gunther Erich. The Art of Warfare in the Age of Napoleon. Indiana University Press, 1980. ISBN 978-0253202604
- Sloane, W.M. Life of Napoleon. France, 1896 (reprint, 1910), p. 109.
- Smith, Digby. The Napoleonic Wars Data Book. London: Greenhill, 1998. ISBN 978-1853672767
- van Ess-Lodewyk, Willem. Extract of a letter from Gen. Moreau to the Minister of War, Neresheim, June 20. The London Chronicle. W. Day, 1810.
