= Klosterbach =

Klosterbach may refer to:

- Klosterbach (Große Aue), a river of North Rhine-Westphalia, Germany, tributary of the Große Aue
- Klosterbach (Schwarzbach), a river of North Rhine-Westphalia, Germany, tributary of the Schwarzbach
- Klosterbach (Varreler Bäke), a river of Lower Saxony, Germany, tributary of the Ochtum
- Klosterbach (Danube), a river of Bavaria, Germany, tributary of the Danube
