= Pulverbach =

Pulverbach may refer to:

- Pulverbach (Selke), a river of Saxony-Anhalt, Germany, tributary of the Selke
- Pulverbach (Klosterbach), a river of Bavaria, Germany, tributary of the Klosterbach
