= Estates of Württemberg =

The Estates of Württemberg (German: Württembergische Landstände) was the Estates of the Duchy of Württemberg, lasting from 1457 to 1918 except for 1802-15. After the creation of the Kingdom of Württemberg the 1815 reestablished estates became a bicameral parliament by 1819.

The parliament raised taxes for the counts, dukes and then kings of Württemberg, and discussed matters of public policy more widely in its later years.

== Chambers ==
The parliament comprised two chambers between 1819–1918:

- The "Kammer der Standesherren" from the hereditary nobility or "First Chamber", and
- The "Kammer der Abgeordneten" from the commoners

It was succeeded in 1919-33 by the Landtag of the "Free People's State of Württemberg", a part of the Weimar Republic.

== History ==
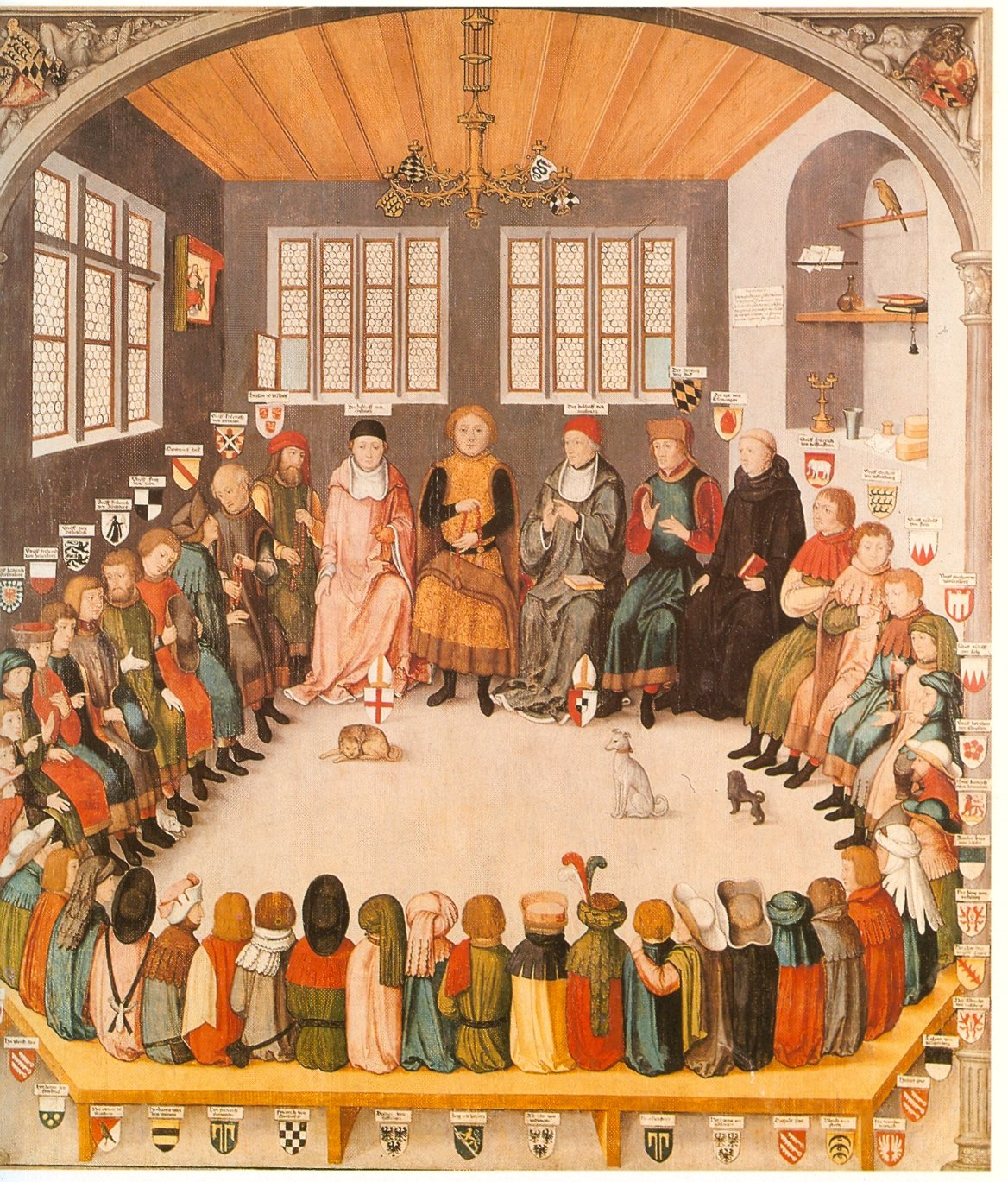
Eberhard III and his Council c.1400

As the power of the House of Württemberg grew, inevitably this involved "Diets" - councils - meeting with the Count to debate on public policy.

The first formal assembly of the Estates, called a Landtag, occurred in Leonberg in 1457 when Count Ulrich V summoned the notables of the towns to counterbalance the knights (Ritterschaft) who attended the Diet. Two years later, the second Diet was called in Tübingen when the Count sought to have the majority of his son, Eberhard V, recognized by the Diet and was attended by the town's bailiff and judge as well as officials from 13 other towns. The Estates (Landschaft), the largest political body in the Duchy, were an entity that had existed even before the founding of the Duchy. The prelates were the abbots of the fourteen monasteries of the Duchy, who were generally present at the diets as Ducal appointees after the Reformation. Roughly 30 noblemen, usually Ducal councillors or some other senior officials, also regularly attended. Since the Estates were intended to be the representatives of the Duchy's inhabitants, about 75% of the participants of a Diet were townsfolk, and the peasantry had almost no input. The Estates had no means of imposing their will, and were to a certain extent dependent on the Duke to be effective.

At times they were able to convince the Duke to make reforms, such as with the Treaty of Tübingen in 1514. During times of minority or absence of the Duke, the Estates had a large decree of control over policy and government, which they effectively lost in times of majority. Duke Ulrich, for example, rarely called Diets. Of the burghers that attended the Landtag of 1520, all of them belonged to the court and council of 44 towns, all of them being Ehrbarkeit (meaning: honourable and reliable). The lack of resistance on their part to Ulrich's strong government shows that the Estates had neither a strong leader and popular support nor a permanent position in the Duchy's constitution and could be easily coerced. The Estates became useful to the Duke for the payment of his debts and for the declaration of the war, and they provided the Duchy's leading inhabitants political power and a forum to debate in. The Treaty of Esslingen in 1492, which stated that 12 members of the Estates could assume rule in times of incompetence, became the basis for following compromises between the Duke and the Estates throughout the 16th centuries.

The regency of Duke Ulrich was a time of transition for the Estates, as they authored a government based on collegiate principle, with four nobles acting as regents and two prelates as advisers. The Estates voiced the interests of the towns to the regency, but during the Swabian War this regency became opposed to the wishes of the local burghers, among whom the war was very unpopular. The Estates would continue to vote more men and money to the war, which would end in defeat for the Swabian League. The Estates would continue to exercise their right to approve taxation to the Duchy's frequent wars, a right that would be extremely tested during Ulrich's reign.

== Late 1700s ==
By the late 1700s the long history of the parliament was remarked on by Edmund Burke. The then-Duke Frederick invited Burke to Stuttgart in the 1790s, but he excused himself on the grounds of old age and infirmity, instead sending Frederick a copy of his Letters on a Regicide Peace.

== See also ==
- List of presidents of the First Chamber of the Estates of Württemberg
- List of presidents of the Second Chamber of the Estates of Württemberg
- History of Württemberg
