= Pulverbach (Klosterbach) =

River in Germany

Location
- Country: Germany
- States: Bavaria

Physical characteristics
- Mouth
  - location: Klosterbach
  - coordinates: 48.6165°N 10.5714°E

Basin features
- Progression: Klosterbach→ Danube→ Black Sea

Pulverbach is a river in Bavaria, Germany. It is a right tributary of the Klosterbach in Höchstädt an der Donau.

== See also ==
- List of rivers of Bavaria
