= After Blenheim =

1796 poem by Robert Southey

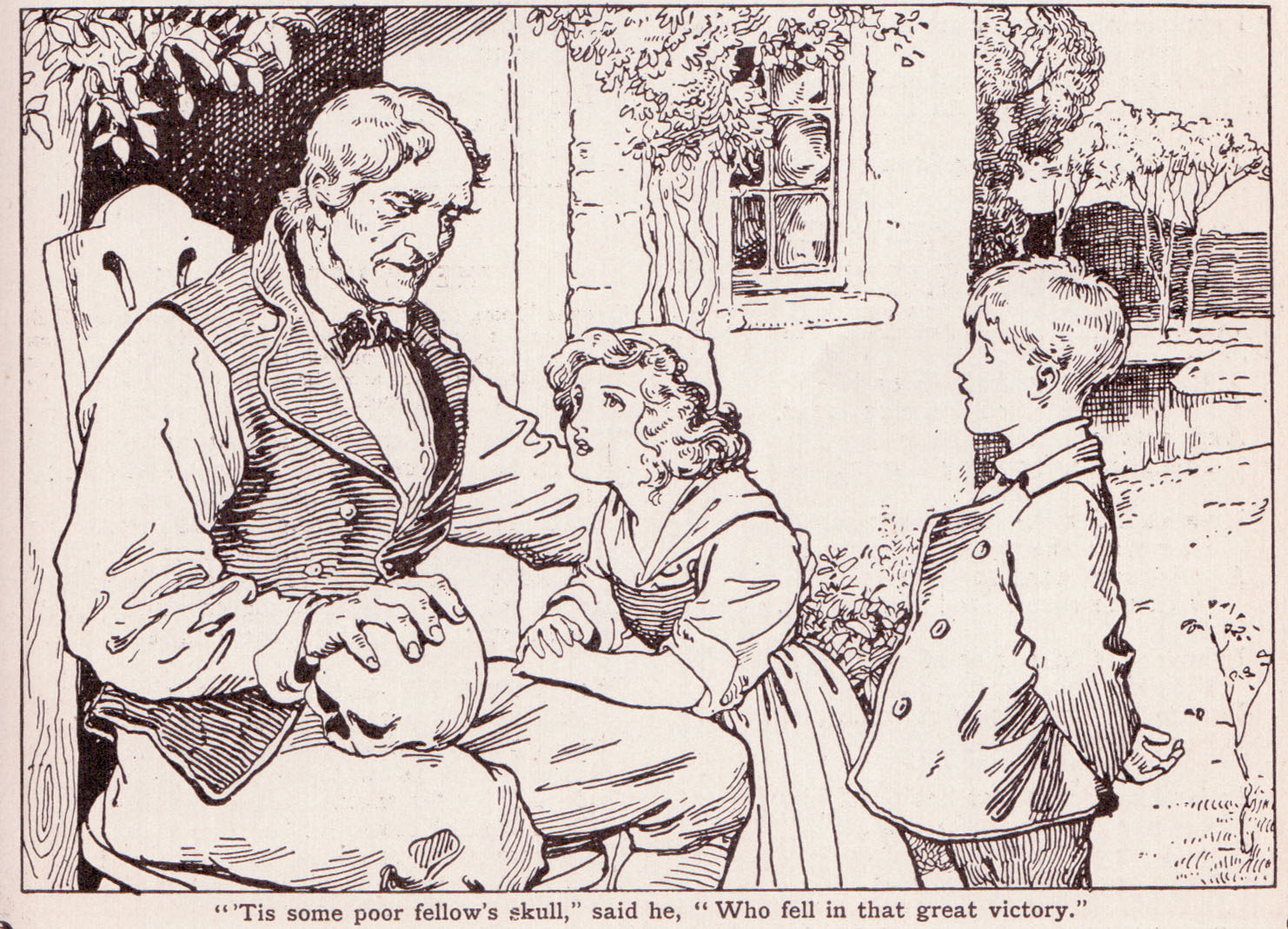
"'Tis some poor fellow's skull', said he (line 17–18) Who fell in that great victory". Illustration from The Children's Encyclopædia

"After Blenheim" is an anti-war poem written by the English Romantic poet Robert Southey in 1796. It is set at the Bavarian village of Blindheim, where the Battle of Blenheim was fought on 13 August 1704 as part of the War of the Spanish Succession. The poem is set decades after the battle, where two German children ask questions about a skull one of them has found. Their grandfather, an old man, tells them of burned homes, civilian casualties and rotting corpses, while repeatedly calling it "a famous victory".

== Summary ==
The main characters include Old Kaspar (an elderly farmer whose father lived in Blindheim, called Blenheim by the English) and his granddaughter Wilhelmine and grandson Peterkin.

Old Kaspar has finished his work and is sitting in the sun in front of his cottage, watching his little granddaughter, Wilhelmine, playing. Peterkin, his grandson, has been rolling a hard round object he found near the stream while playing there. He brings it to the old man, who explains that it is a human skull (lines 17–18) and that he often finds them while ploughing in the garden (lines 19-22). The children anticipate a story—"And little Wilhelmine looks up/with wonder-waiting eyes" (ln 26–27). Kaspar explains to the children the story of the battle and that the English routed the French, although he admits he never understood the reason for the war himself.

He also mentions that his father had a cottage by the rivulet (a small stream);"My father lived at Blenheim then"—where Peterkin found the skull, until the soldiers burned it to the ground, and his father and mother had fled, with their child. The following verse refers to a childing mother, or a mother with child (ln 45–46), and many of them died with their newborns, possibly alluding to his own mother.

Thousands of corpses lay rotting in the fields, but he shrugs it off, as part of the cost of war (ln 53–54). Wilhelmine says it was a wicked thing, but he contradicts her, saying it was a very famous victory.

== Criticism ==
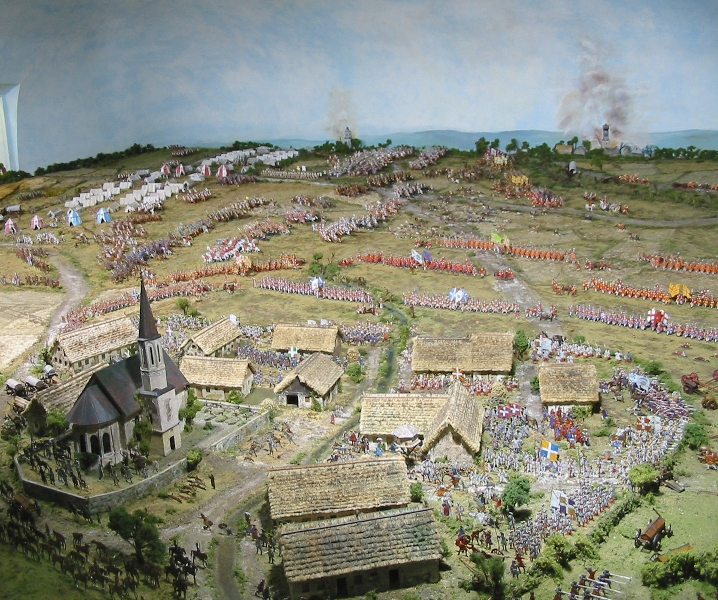
Diorama of the Battle of Blenheim in Höchstädt

The poem has a scathing criticism of the horrors of the war and shows that international diplomacy, politics and war are matters that are cut off from the lives of common men. In an outburst of praise for the heroes who won the war, Old Kaspar reveals the typical inability of an ordinary citizen to grasp the reason why the war took place.

The poem is considered to be anti-war, but arguably, Southey was not himself anti-war. Byron considered Southey a puzzle since on one hand, he denigrated the English victory at Blenheim; on the other, he praised the Battle of Waterloo in The Poet's Pilgrimage to Waterloo, a popular poem that generated £215 in two months of publication.

It is one of Southey's most famous poems. The internal repetition of "but 'twas a famous victory" juxtaposed with the initial five lines of each stanza, establish that the narrator does not know why the battle was fought, why thousands died, why his father's cottage was burned. The often-quoted closing lines :

"But what good came of it at last?"
Quoth little Peterkin.
"Why that I cannot tell," said he,
"But 'twas a famous victory."

"After Blenheim", also called "The Battle of Blenheim", was written during Southey's Jacobin years (roughly 1790–1800). In a letter to Charles Collins, he wrote of travelling through Woodstock in the summer of 1793, and of refusing to even turn his head to look at the walls of Blenheim Palace, built by the 1st Duke of Marlborough, the leader of the victorious Allied forces, and named for the battle. Southey wrote the poem, sometimes considered by critics as the most celebrated of British anti-war poems, while living at Westbury with his mother and his cousin (Peggy) in a renovated ale-house, which he shared also with a "great carroty cat". It appeared in publication with several others, in the category of Ballads and metrical tales, with the revenge tale of Lord William, and the narrative Queen Oracca.

By 1820 Southey had changed his mind about the battle, describing it as the "greatest victory which had ever done honour to British arms". He calculated that had the battle not been won, the dominance of France might have overset the Protestant Succession in Britain.
