= Höchstädt an der Donau (Verwaltungsgemeinschaft) =

- Verwaltungsgemeinschaft
- Location of Höchstädt an der Donau within Dillingen district
- Interactive map of Höchstädt an der Donau
- Location within Germany Location within Bavaria
- Coordinates: 48°37′N 10°34′E
- Country: Germany
- State: Bavaria
- Admin. region: Swabia
- District: Dillingen
- Seat: Höchstädt an der Donau
- Subdivisions: 5 municipalities

Area
  - Total: 141.69 km^{2} (54.71 sq mi)

Population (2025-12-31)
  - Total: 12,947
  - Density: 91.376/km^{2} (236.66/sq mi)
- Time zone: UTC+01:00 (CET)
  - Summer (DST): UTC+02:00 (CEST)
- Website: www.vg-hoechstaedt.de

Höchstädt an der Donau is a Verwaltungsgemeinschaft (municipal association) in the district of Dillingen in Bavaria, Germany. Its seat is in Höchstädt an der Donau.

It consists of the following municipalities:

1. Blindheim
2. Finningen
3. Höchstädt an der Donau
4. Lutzingen
5. Schwenningen
