= Treaty of Tübingen =

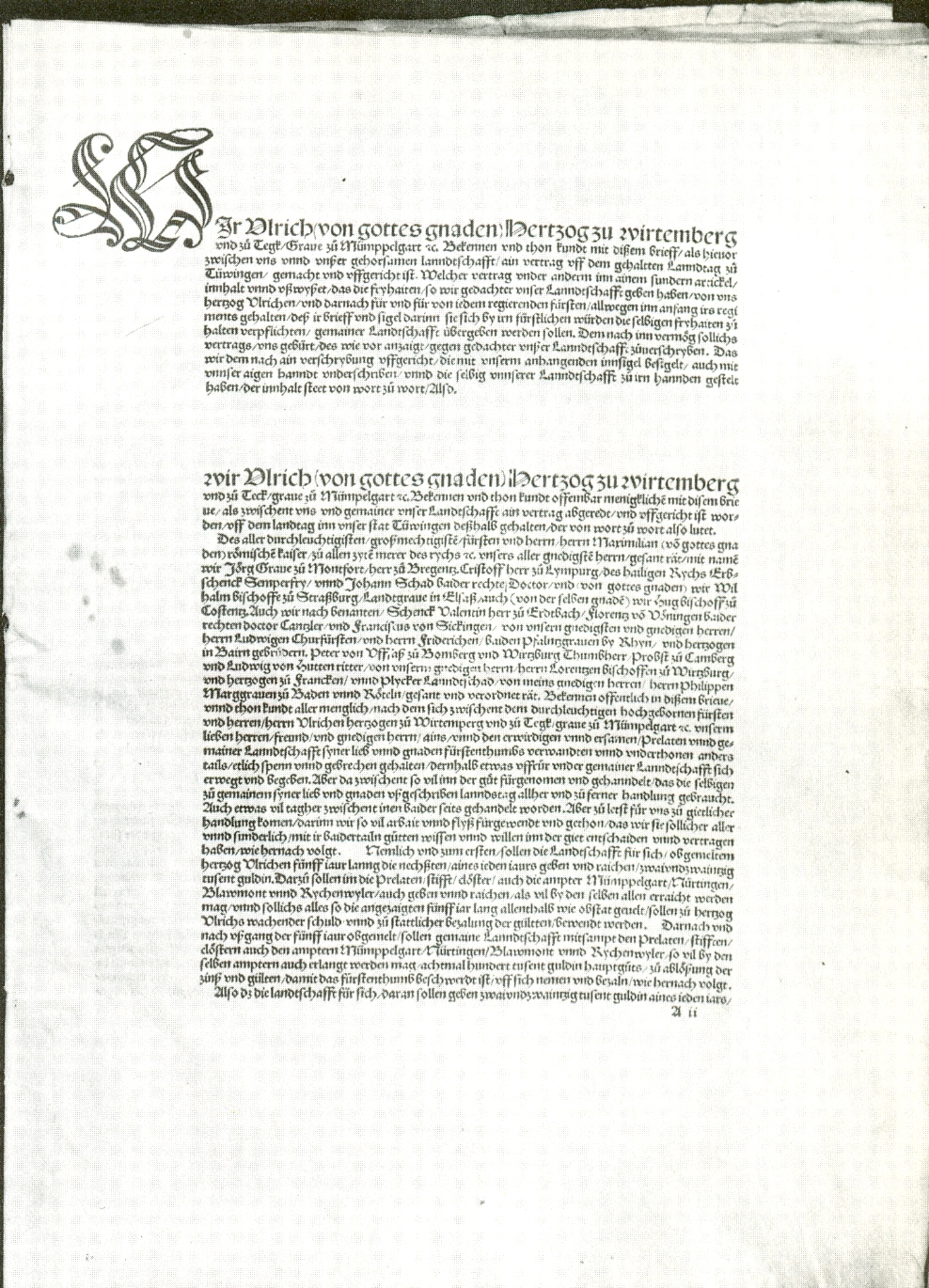
- An original page of the treaty at the Central State Archive Stuttgart
- Location: Tübingen, Duchy of Württemberg
- Effective: 8 July 1514
- Signatories: Ulrich, Duke of Württemberg
- Parties: Duke of Württemberg; Estates of Württemberg

The Treaty of Tübingen was a treaty signed in the Duchy of Württemberg between its Duke, Ulrich, and the Estates of Württemberg. The treaty concluded the Poor Conrad revolt against Ulrich and annulled his recent taxes on the populace of the Duchy, while the Estates of his realm agreed to liquidate his substantial debts.

== Background ==
Württemberg was a minor state in the Holy Roman Empire that had existed as a County from the late 11th century. Its rulers grew increasingly powerful over the Middle Ages by accumulating territory in Swabia and Imperial rights. By the 1270s, it was able to scuttle the efforts of the first Habsburg Holy Roman Emperor, Rudolph I, to restore the Duchy of Swabia. After acquiring Teck, seat of the defunct Duke of Teck and formerly a possession of the House of Zähringen, Württemberg had a case for elevation to ducal status. In 1495, at the Diet of Worms, Emperor Maximilian I made Württemberg a Duchy in what would be the final such elevation of an Imperial Count to a title other than "Prince" (Fürst).

The Count at the time of Württemberg's elevation to ducal status was Eberhard V, who had reunited the County in 1480 after it had divided between two branches of the House of Württemberg. Eberhard V died in 1495, leaving the Duchy − and 300,000 florins of debt − to his cousin, Duke Eberhard II. Eberhard II was not popular or a skilled administrator and was deposed in March 1498 by the personal intervention of Maximilian I. This left a nine-year-old, Ulrich, Duke of Württemberg. The Estates formed a four-man regency council to rule for Ulrich until Maximilian I declared Ulrich of age in 1503, violating the 1492 Treaty of Esslingen's stipulation that the Duke reached majority at age 20. The young Duke opened his reign with a successful campaign during the War of the Succession of Landshut, but also began accumulating massive debts. By 1514, the Duchy owed more than a million florins. To repay that debt Ulrich legislated a 6% wealth tax, which was so unpopular it never passed into law, and then an indirect tax on consumables that badly affected the Duchy's lower classes.

In response to these taxes, peasants of the Remstal region rose up in the Poor Conrad revolt in 1514 to resist further taxation. Poor Conrad was one of the Bundschuh peasant revolts in southwest Germany between 1493 and 1517.

== Aftermath ==
Coat of arms of the city of Tübingen, with the Landsknecht arms bearing stag antlers

Until its annulment in 1805, the Treaty of Tübingen acted as a kind of written constitution for the Duchy. The treaty, which transformed the Estates of the Duchy into a check on ducal power, was for a time regarded by scholars as a "Württemberger Magna Carta", though this comparison has been discredited. Theologian and historian Hellmut G. Haasis described the treaty as being a "shambles" that made no real progress toward a democratic state.

Because of Tübingen's role in ending the Poor Conrad revolt, Ulrich awarded the city the right to bear the Ducal stag antlers on its coat of arms above its blazon on 18 August 1514.
