= Ferdinand August Freiherr von Hügel =

Ferdinand August von Hügel (11 September 1775 – 19 October 1834) was a general in the royal Württemberg Infantry, Inspector of the Infantry Corps, and governor of the Residence city of Stuttgart. He was awarded the gold cross of Honor for his action in the military campaigns of 1815. He was one of three sons of Johann Andreas von Hügel, (born 1734 in Strasbourg and died in 1807), a captain in the Seven Years' War in the service of Württemberg. His father fought at the Battle of Höchstädt on the side of the Allied Coalition in 1800; after the Peace of Luneville, Württemberg fell under the influence of Napoleon's France and he commanded a regiment seconded to Napoleon's army. He and Dominique Vandamme had numerous confrontations during the 1809 campaign. Von Hügel objected to the ways in which Vandamme exploited and abused the Württemberg soldiers, when he commanded Napoleon's VIII Corps.
