= Lutzingen =

- Municipality
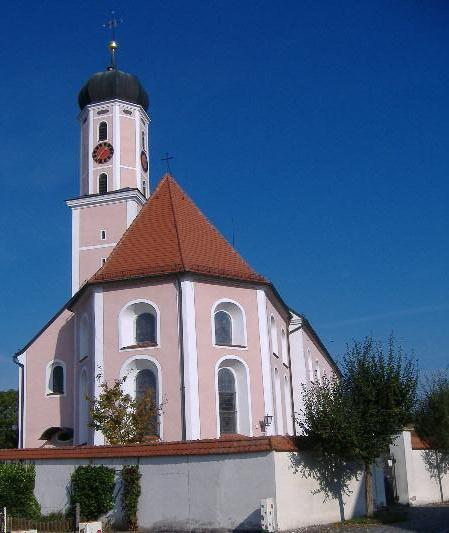
- Saint Michael Church

- Coat of arms

- Location of Lutzingen within Dillingen district
- Interactive map of Lutzingen
- Location within Germany Location within Bavaria
- Coordinates: 48°39′N 10°33′E
- Country: Germany
- State: Bavaria
- Admin. region: Schwaben
- District: Dillingen
- Municipal assoc.: Höchstädt an der Donau

Government
  - Mayor (2020–26): Christian Weber (CSU)

Area
  - Total: 24.93 km^{2} (9.63 sq mi)
- Elevation: 439 m (1,440 ft)

Population (2025-12-31)
  - Total: 972
  - Density: 39.0/km^{2} (101/sq mi)
- Time zone: UTC+01:00 (CET)
  - Summer (DST): UTC+02:00 (CEST)
- Postal codes: 89440
- Dialling codes: 09074
- Vehicle registration: DLG

Lutzingen is a municipality in the district of Dillingen in Bavaria in Germany. The town is a member of the municipal association Höchstädt an der Donau.
