= Finningen =

- Municipality
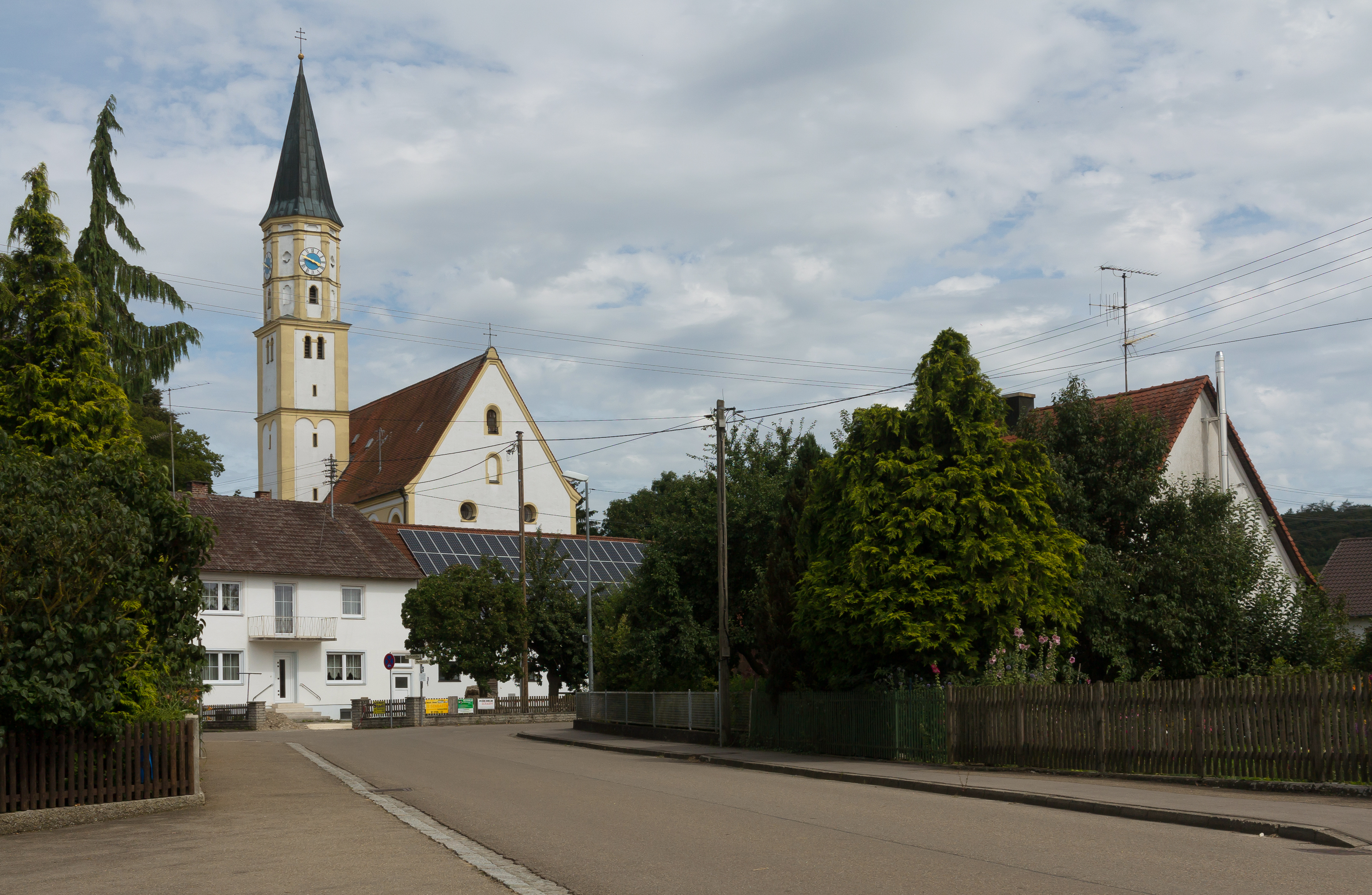
- Church of Saint Martin

- Coat of arms

- Location of Finningen within Dillingen district
- Interactive map of Finningen
- Location within Germany Location within Bavaria
- Coordinates: 48°39′N 10°30′E
- Country: Germany
- State: Bavaria
- Admin. region: Schwaben
- District: Dillingen
- Municipal assoc.: Höchstädt an der Donau

Government
  - Mayor (2020–26): Klaus Friegel

Area
  - Total: 27.82 km^{2} (10.74 sq mi)
- Elevation: 495 m (1,624 ft)

Population (2025-12-31)
  - Total: 1,874
  - Density: 67.36/km^{2} (174.5/sq mi)
- Time zone: UTC+01:00 (CET)
  - Summer (DST): UTC+02:00 (CEST)
- Postal codes: 89435
- Dialling codes: 09074
- Vehicle registration: DLG

Finningen (German pronunciation: [ˈfɪnɪŋən]) is a municipality in the district of Dillingen in Bavaria in Germany. It is 7 km north of the town of Dillingen. The population is 1206 (as of 2017). The town is a member of the municipal association Höchstädt an der Donau.
