= Klosterbach (Danube) =

River in Germany

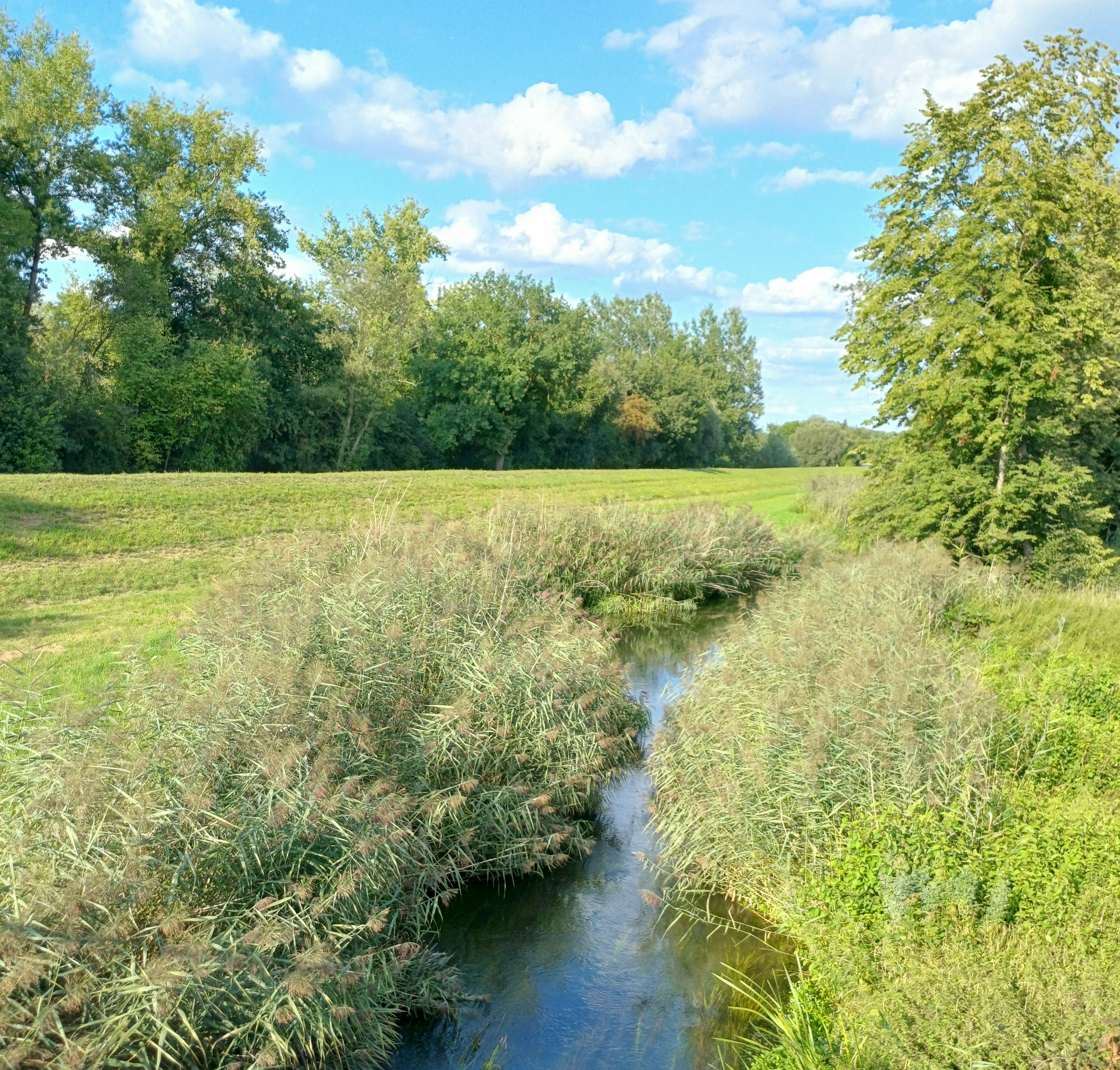
- The Klosterbach at the Barrage Schwenningen

Location
- Country: Germany
- States: Baden-Württemberg; Bavaria

Physical characteristics
- Mouth
  - location: Danube
  - coordinates: 48.6494°N 10.6925°E
- Length: 34.4 km (21.4 mi)
- Basin size: 147 km^{2} (57 sq mi)

Basin features
- Progression: Danube→ Black Sea

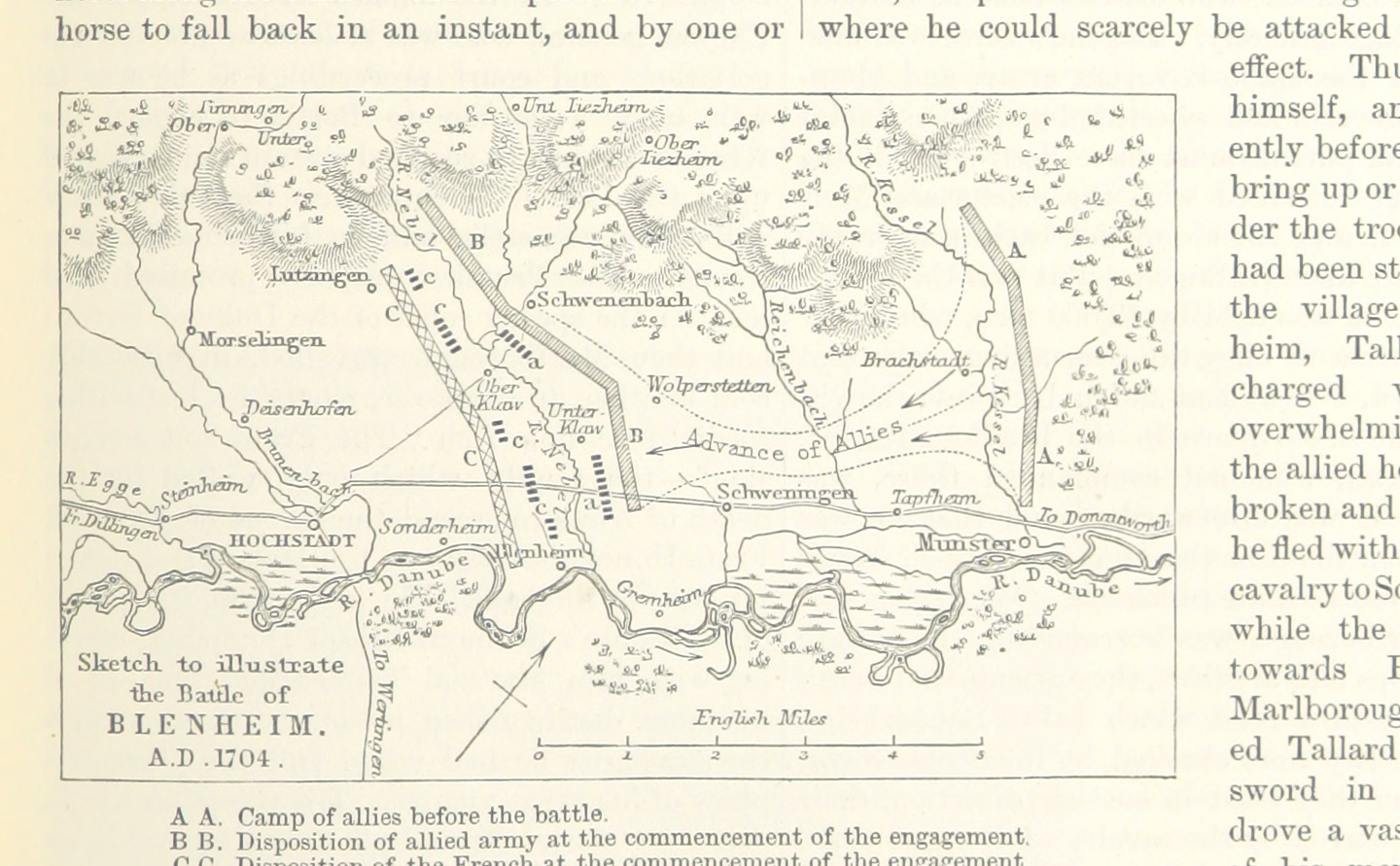
Today the Klosterbach is the original looping course of the River Danube before that river was straightened into a new channel to the south, in the area of Schwenningen

Klosterbach is a river of Baden-Württemberg and Bavaria, Germany. It is left a tributary of the Danube near Schwenningen.

One of its tributaries is the Nebel (German Nebelbach), which played a tactical role in the Battle of Blenheim and is often mentioned in accounts of that battle.

== See also ==
- List of rivers of Bavaria
