= List of presidents of the Second Chamber of the Estates of Württemberg =

Presidents of the Second Chamber of the Estates of Württemberg

Name	Period	Party
Jakob Friedrich von Weishaar	1820–1830	
Ludwig von Gaisberg-Schöckingen	1833–1839	
Karl Georg Wächter	1839–1848	
Wilhelm Murschel	1848–1849	
Adolf Schoder (President of Landesversammlung)	1849–1850	
Friedrich von Röder	1850–1863	
Franz von Weber	1863–1868	
Theodor von Geßler	1868–1870	
Rudolf Probst	1870	
Franz von Weber	1870–1874	
Julius von Hölder	1875–1881	Deutsche Partei
Karl Hohl	1882–1894	
Friedrich von Payer	1894–1912	DVP
Heinrich von Kraut	1912–1918	Konservativ/BdL

== Sources ==
- Raberg, Frank (editor): Biographisches Handbuch der württembergischen Landtagsabgeordneten 1815-1933, Kohlhammer Verlag, Stuttgart 2001 ISBN 3-17-016604-2
