= First Battle of Höchstädt =

Battle in the War of Spanish Succession

Battle of Höchstädt
- Part of War of the Spanish Succession
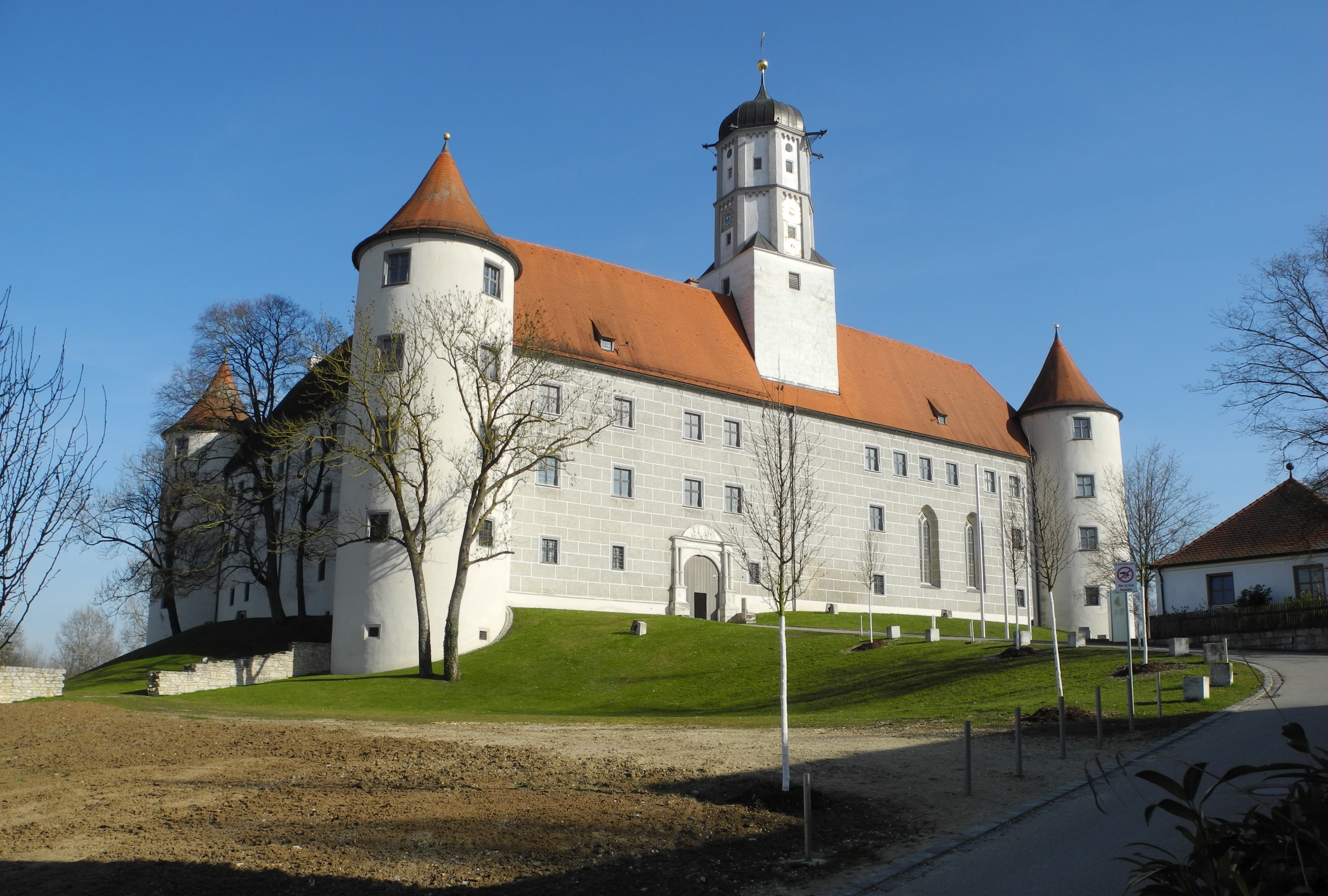
- Höchstädt Castle; French troops used this as a defensive position during the battle
Date	20 September 1703 (Note: The article uses the Gregorian calendar, widely adopted in Europe from 1582 onwards, except the British Isles, which continued to use the Julian calendar until 1752 (see Old Style and New Style dates) Höchstädt was fought on 19 September O/S)
Location	Höchstädt an der Donau, Bavaria
Result	Franco-Bavarian victory

Belligerents
Holy Roman Empire	Kingdom of France; Electorate of Bavaria

Commanders and leaders
(Habsburg monarchy) Limburg Styrum (Kingdom of Prussia) Leopold of Anhalt-Dessau (Electorate of Saxony) Lieutenant-General von der Schulenburg	(Kingdom of France) Claude de Villars (Electorate of Bavaria) Elector Maximilian II (Kingdom of France) Marquis d'Husson (Electorate of Bavaria) Graf von Arco (Kingdom of France) General Cheyladet

Strength
18,000	23,000

Casualties and losses
4,500 dead, wounded or captured	1,500 dead or wounded

The First Battle of Höchstädt (Note: The 1704 battle known in English as Blenheim is also referred to the Second Battle of Höchstädt or Zweite Schlacht bei Höchstädt in German) took place on 20 September 1703 during the War of the Spanish Succession. Fought near Höchstädt an der Donau in Bavaria, a combined Franco-Bavarian force under Claude Louis Hector de Villars defeated an Imperial army led by Hermann Otto II of Limburg Stirum.

During the summer of 1703, a Franco-Bavarian offensive along the Danube potentially threatened the Habsburg capital of Vienna. In response, Imperial forces under Louis William, Margrave of Baden-Baden entered Bavaria, and captured Augsburg. He then ordered Limburg Stirum to cross the Danube at Donauwörth with 18,000 men, and join an attack on the Franco-Bavarian camp at Nordendorf. The latter arrived in Höchstädt on 19 September, but Villars and Maximilian had already reached Donauwörth.

Early on the morning on 20 September, Limburg Stirum found the main Franco-Bavarian army of 15,000 was advancing on him from Donauwörth, with a corps of 8,000 under the Marquis d'Husson in his rear. He therefore decided to withdraw north to Nördlingen, but was attacked by d'Husson as he did so. The Imperials drove their outnumbered opponents back, before the main Franco-Bavarian force arrived on the battlefield at 11:00 am. Attempts to block the road north nearly succeeded, before a stubborn rearguard action by Prussian troops under Leopold of Anhalt-Dessau enabled the rest of the infantry to make an orderly retreat.

The Imperials lost around 4,500 men compared to 1,500 for the Franco-Bavarians, as well as much of their baggage, but Maximilian opted not to pursue. The 1704 Battle of Blenheim was fought over much of the same ground.

== Background ==
When it began in March 1701, the War of the Spanish Succession was initially focused on the Spanish Netherlands and Northern Italy. In 1702, fighting expanded into Germany, with an Imperial army under Louis William, Margrave of Baden-Baden, capturing Landau in September. (Note: Now in Germany, the town was part of France from 1680 to 1815) This success was offset when Bavaria joined the French coalition, (Note: As part of the Holy Roman Empire, Bavaria was thus in rebellion) while the French commander Villars won a minor victory at Friedlingen in October. However, this had little impact on the strategic situation, with both sides going into winter quarters.

1703 began with a campaign along the Danube by Maximilian II Emanuel, Elector of Bavaria. By the end of April, he held strongholds along the river stretching from Ulm to Regensburg, home of the Imperial Diet. Villars, who had spent the winter in Strasbourg, capital of French Alsace, crossed the Rhine at Kehl on 28 April, and met up with the Bavarians at Ehingen in mid-May.

Bavaria (dark green) key locations in text;

He tried to persuade Maximilian to join him in marching down the Danube and taking Vienna, the Austrian capital, a plan vetoed by Maximilian. Instead, the Bavarians advanced south into the Tyrol, but were forced to withdraw in late August. While Maximilian was engaged in this attempt, Louis William marched into Bavaria and took up positions around Haunsheim, just north of Dillingen an der Donau. To monitor his movements, Villars constructed a fortified camp outside Dillingen, where he was joined by Maximilian on 1 September.

While the two commanders argued over their next move, Louis William left Hermann Otto II of Limburg Stirum and 18,000 men to keep them occupied. On 3 September, he himself crossed the Danube with a small force at Munderkingen, 12 kilometres (7 mi) south of Ehingen. From there, he marched on Augsburg, a move that threatened Munich, the Bavarian capital. Taken by surprise, Maximilian and Villars tried to intercept him, leaving 13,000 troops at Dillingen under the Marquis d'Husson.

They were too late to save Augsburg, which surrendered on 6 September, and withdrew to positions around Nordendorf, on the right bank of the Danube, 40 kilometres (25 mi) east of Dillingen. Louis William now ordered Limburg Stirum to cross the Danube at Donauwörth, then join him in attacking the Franco-Bavarian camp. However, his artillery was delayed, giving Villars and Maximilian time to reach Donauwörth first, and order d'Husson to move up from Dillingen. When Limburg Stirum stopped at Höchstädt an der Donau on 19 September, he was unaware there were 15,000 men blocking his advance, with d'Husson and 8,000 men closing from behind.

== Battle ==
The Imperial army spent the night camped on level ground outside Schwenningen, 7.7 kilometres (5 mi) from Höchstädt. At 6:00 am on 20 September, Bavarian cavalry scouts from Donauwörth clashed with Prussian outposts in Tapfheim, while Imperial foragers ran into d'Husson's advance guard under General Cheyladet. Correctly deducing he was threatened from two sides, Limburg Stirum held a hurried conference with his deputies, Lieutenant-General Johann Matthias von der Schulenburg and the leader of the Prussian contingent, Leopold I, Prince of Anhalt-Dessau. Deciding their current position was indefensible, they agreed to withdraw along the road running north from Schwenningen to Nördlingen. In preparation, his artillery fired three shots, the signal for all troops to return to the main army.

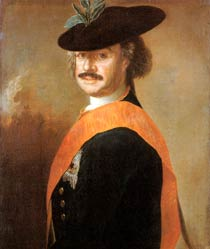
Leopold I, Prince of Anhalt-Dessau, commander of the Prussian contingent, whose stubborn resistance enabled most of the Imperial army to escape

Unfortunately, this was also the signal Villars had previously agreed with d'Husson would indicate he was ready to attack. Assuming this to be the case, the latter launched his assault prematurely at 8:00 am, with Villars still some distance away. While this stopped the retreat, and both sides suffered heavy casualties in a series of bloody firefights, the Imperial troops eventually drove back their outnumbered opponents. French units around Höchstädt and its castle repulsed a number of Prussian assaults, but by 11:00 am d'Husson's corps was disintegrating. Limburg Stirum thought he had won a victory, only to find the main Franco-Bavarian army had now reached the battlefield. Bavarian cavalry under the Graf von Arco immediately attacked the Imperial lines, to provide time for their slower moving infantry to cut the road to Nördlingen.

By 13:00, the Imperial cavalry had been in action for nearly five hours, and taken heavy losses. Limburg Stirum gave them permission to withdraw, with the infantry left to fight their way out, a situation made more difficult because they had to abandon their baggage and ammunition supplies. At one point, four battalions of French infantry managed to get across their line of retreat, and the road was re-opened only by a series of desperate charges. The rear guard was formed by Anhalt-Dessau's Prussians, whose stubborn resistance gave the rest of the Imperial infantry time to escape.

== Aftermath ==
By 16:00, the last of the Imperial infantry had exited the battlefield, reaching Nördlingen around midnight. Estimates of casualties vary; in his "Memoirs", Villars claimed to have killed, wounded or captured over 12,000, for the loss of only 1,000. (Note: These figures frequently appear in English language accounts of the battle) Other sources suggest 4,500 Imperial casualties, those of the Franco-Bavarian force being around 1,500. Prussian archives put their own losses as 900 from a contingent of 6,000, with another 3,000 attributed to the rest of the army.

Although Villars wanted to pursue, Maximilian argued their troops were in no shape to do so, having marched nearly 40 kilometres (25 mi) in twelve hours, then fought a battle. He besieged Augsburg instead, which surrendered in early October, but this irretrievably damaged his relationship with Villars, who was recalled to France. Despite the failure of their Bavarian offensive, Imperial units based in the Lines of Stollhofen blocked French attempts to break into the northern Rhineland. Louis William played an important role in the 1704 campaign that ended at Blenheim, fought over much of the same ground, and known to the Dutch and Germans as the Second Battle of Höchstädt.

== Sources ==
- Bodart, Gaston (1908). Militär-historisches Kriegs-Lexikon (1618-1905).
- Falkner, James (2016). War of Spanish Succession 1701-1714. Pen and Sword Military. ISBN 978-1781590317.
- Holmes, Richard (2008). Marlborough; England's Fragile Genius. Harper Press. ISBN 978-0007225712.
- Jany, Carl (1967). Geschichte der Preußischen Armee, Volume 15 1500 bis 1740 (in German). Biblio Verlag.
- Lynn, John A. (1999). The Wars of Louis XIV 1667-1714. Longman. ISBN 978-0-582-05629-9.
- Nolan, Cathal J (2008). Wars of the age of Louis XIV, 1650-1715: an encyclopedia of global warfare and civilization. Bloomsbury 3PL. ISBN 978-0274973460.
- Périni, Hardÿ de (1896). Batailles françaises; Volume VI (in French). Ernest Flammarion.
