= Schwenningen, Bavaria =

Schwenningen
- Municipality
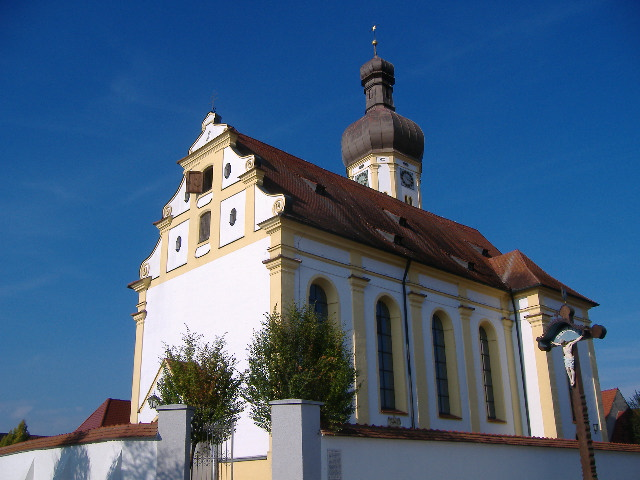
- Church of Saints Ulrich and John the Baptist

- Coat of arms

- Location of Schwenningen within Dillingen district
- Interactive map of Schwenningen
- Location within Germany Location within Bavaria
- Coordinates: 48°39′N 10°39′E
- Country: Germany
- State: Bavaria
- Admin. region: Schwaben
- District: Dillingen
- Municipal assoc.: Höchstädt an der Donau

Government
  - Mayor (2020–26): Johannes Ebermayer

Area
  - Total: 25.05 km^{2} (9.67 sq mi)
- Elevation: 416 m (1,365 ft)

Population (2025-12-31)
  - Total: 1,396
  - Density: 55.73/km^{2} (144.3/sq mi)
- Time zone: UTC+01:00 (CET)
  - Summer (DST): UTC+02:00 (CEST)
- Postal codes: 89443
- Dialling codes: 09070
- Vehicle registration: DLG

Schwenningen (German pronunciation: [ˈʃvɛnɪŋən]) is a municipality in the district of Dillingen in Bavaria in Germany. The town is a member of the municipal association Höchstädt an der Donau.
