= Blindheim =

Municipality in Bavaria, Germany, location of the 1704 Battle of Blenheim

Blenheim Blindheim
- Municipality
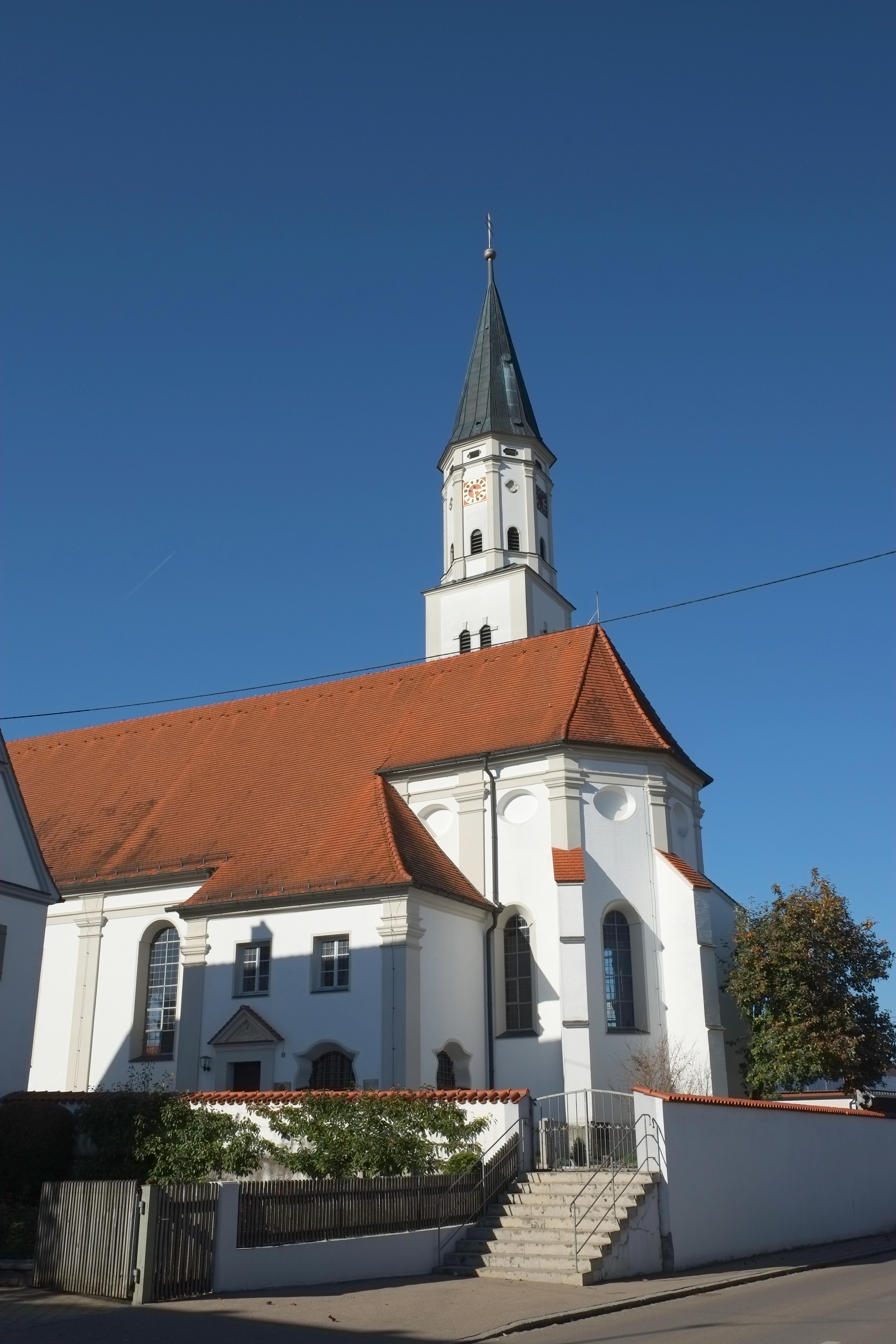
- Church of Saint Martin

- Coat of arms

- Location of Blenheim within Dillingen district
- Interactive map of Blenheim
- Location within Germany Location within Bavaria
- Coordinates: 48°37′54″N 10°37′07″E
- Country: Germany
- State: Bavaria
- Admin. region: Schwaben
- District: Dillingen
- Municipal assoc.: Höchstädt an der Donau

Government
  - Mayor (2020–26): Jürgen Frank

Area
  - Total: 26.4 km^{2} (10.2 sq mi)
- Elevation: 415 m (1,362 ft)

Population (2025-12-31)
  - Total: 1,795
  - Density: 68.0/km^{2} (176/sq mi)
- Time zone: UTC+01:00 (CET)
  - Summer (DST): UTC+02:00 (CEST)
- Postal codes: 89434
- Dialling codes: 09074
- Vehicle registration: DLG
- Website: www.blindheim.de

Blindheim (German: [ˈblɪnthaɪm]), traditionally known in English as Blenheim (/ˈblɛnɪm/ BLEN-im), is a village and a municipality in the Bavarian district of Dillingen in southern Germany. It is north of Augsburg, on the left bank of the Danube River.

The municipality consists of four villages (Blindheim, Unterglauheim, Wolpertstetten and Berghausen). Its population is roughly 1,700. For administrative purposes, it is affiliated with the municipal association of Höchstädt an der Donau.

Since about 1700 the Lordship of Blindheim in the Electorate of Bavaria has been held by the Counts of Rechberg.

On 13 August 1704 the Battle of Blenheim (German: Schlacht von Höchstädt) was fought in the vicinity, having decisive importance on the War of the Spanish Succession. Blenheim Palace in England and Blenheim, the most populous town in the New Zealand region of Marlborough, were named in memory of the battle, and thus ultimately after Blindheim.

In June 1800, the armies of the French First Republic, under command of Jean Victor Moreau, fought Habsburg regulars and Württemberg contingents, under the general command of Pál Kray. At this battle, the culmination of the Danube Campaign of 1800, Moreau forced Kray to abandon Ulm and withdraw into eastern Bavaria.

== See also ==
- Blenheim Palace
- Blenheim, New Zealand
