= Hausen, Villenbach =

Coordinates: 48°29′55″N 10°36′10″E

Hausen
- Village
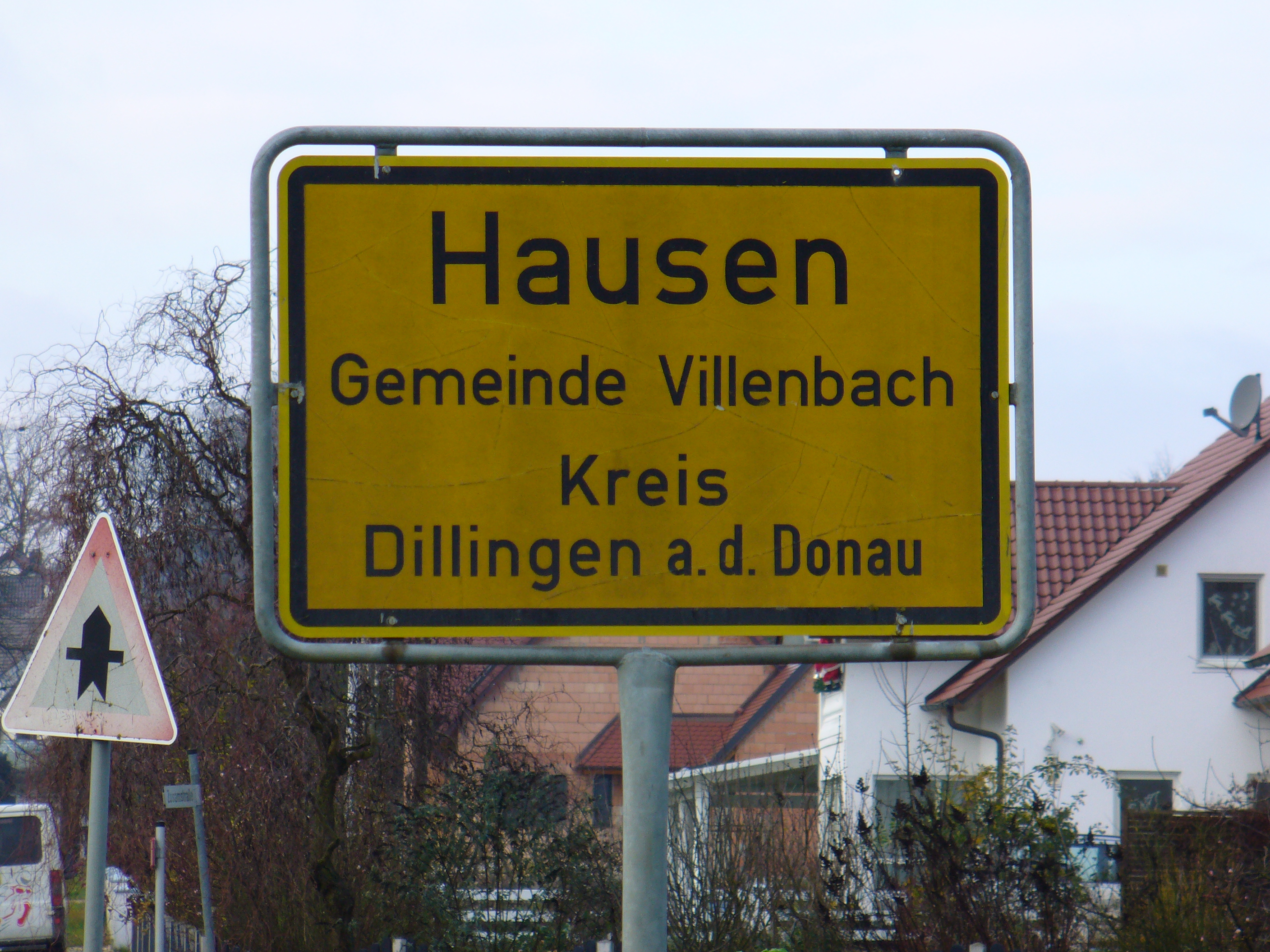
- Hausen
- Etymology: "to the houses"
- Interactive map of Hausen
- Country: Germany
- State: Bavaria
- District: Dillingen
- Municipality: Villenbach
- Established: 9th century

Population (January 1, 2010)
  - Total: 145

Hausen (German pronunciation: [ˈhaʊzn̩]) is a small village in the district of Dillingen (Bavaria, Germany) and part of the municipality Villenbach. It is located about one kilometre south of Villenbach. The "Hausener Mühle", which is now a sawmill, also belongs to the village.

== Name origin ==
The name "Hausen" originated from the expression Husen or Hvsen. If translated into literal German, it means zu den Häusern ("to the houses"). Alternative spellings and associations of the name exist—in earlier times people referred to as Housen bey Vilibach or Husen an der Zussm.

== Population ==
The population of Hausen is 145 (as of January 1, 2010) in about 60 dwellings.

== History ==
Hausen was probably founded in the 9th century when the first people settled there.

The first official mention is attributed to February 7, 1272. On that date, the abbot of Fultenbach, Otto von Gies, gave Ritter Albert von Villenbach a deed for the "Hausener Mühle" at the Zusam. This led to the settlement of Hausen.

One important event in the history of Hausen was during the year 1637, in which over a short period of time, Hausen had no inhabitants, because all citizens of Hausen perished either in the Thirty Years' War or from the Plague or Hunger.

== Modern times ==
Since 1818, Hausen has been an official part of Villenbach. Amongst its small number of local businesses there is a tyre service, a carpenter's workshop, a feed trade and a business for electrical installations. Controversy amongst the town people exists about the creation of a bypass, which divides local opinion.

== Alpenrose Hausen ==
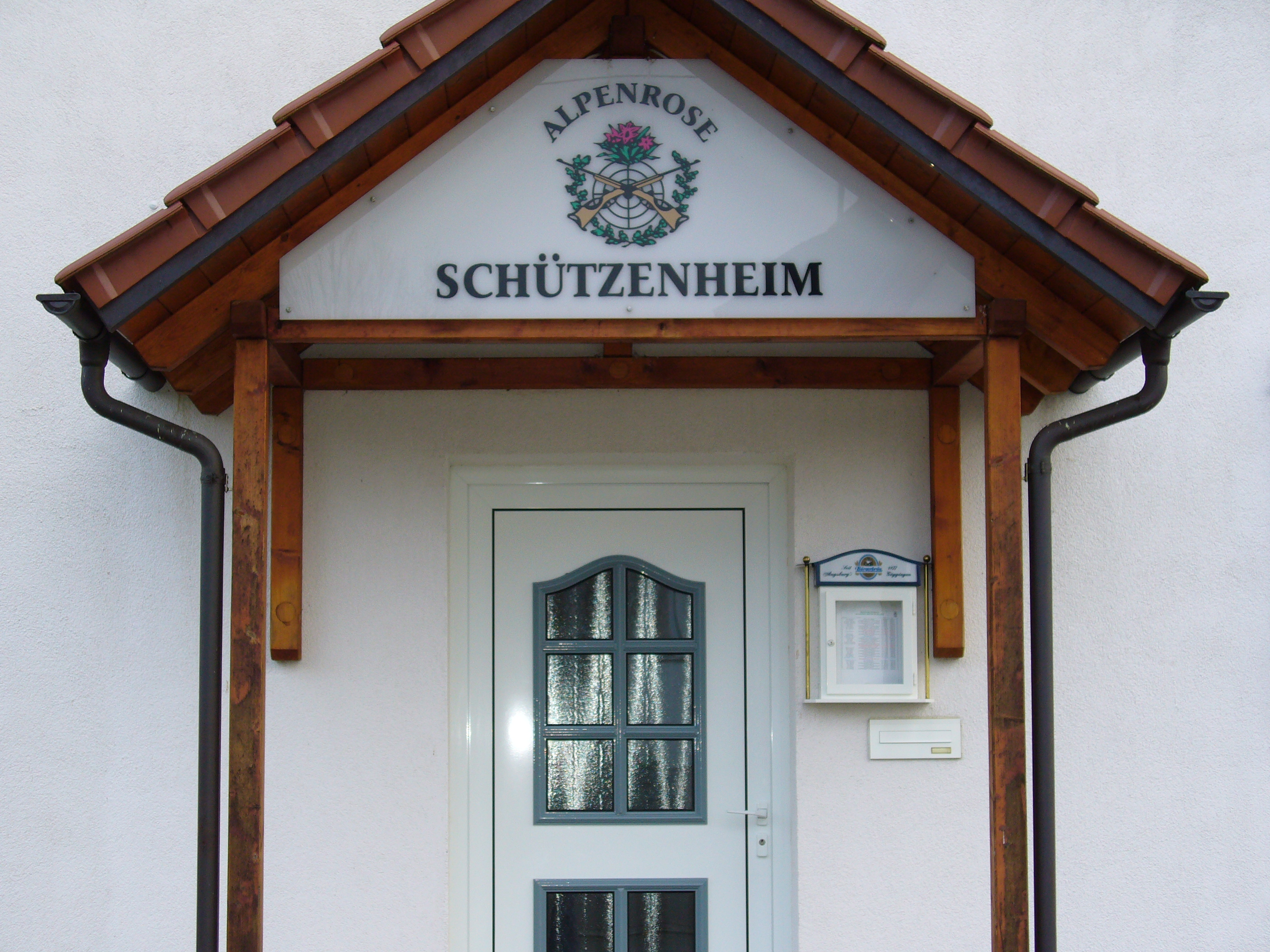
Marksmen's Inn, Hausen

A weekly gathering takes place at the only clubhouse in Hausen, called Alpenrose Hausen, built mostly by the community between 1998 and 2002. It is a very important part of village life, as most of the citizens attend and meet there socially. Also weekly shooting practices take place and occasional competitions against other shooting clubs. Every year the club organises a Maypole festival, a summer festival, a Christmas celebration, a Carnival ball and a Schafkopf tournament.

== Chapel ==
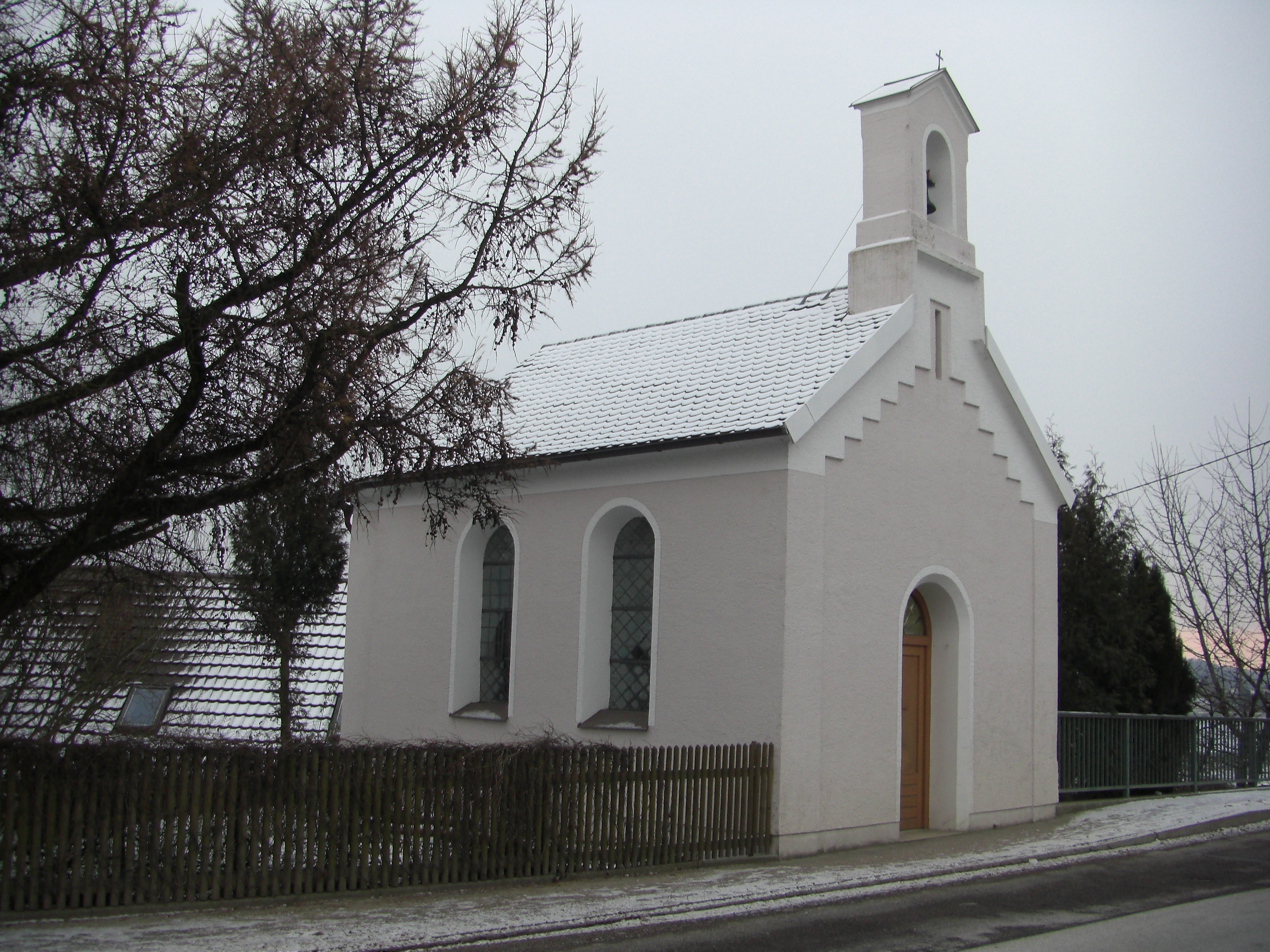
St. Nicholas' Chapel

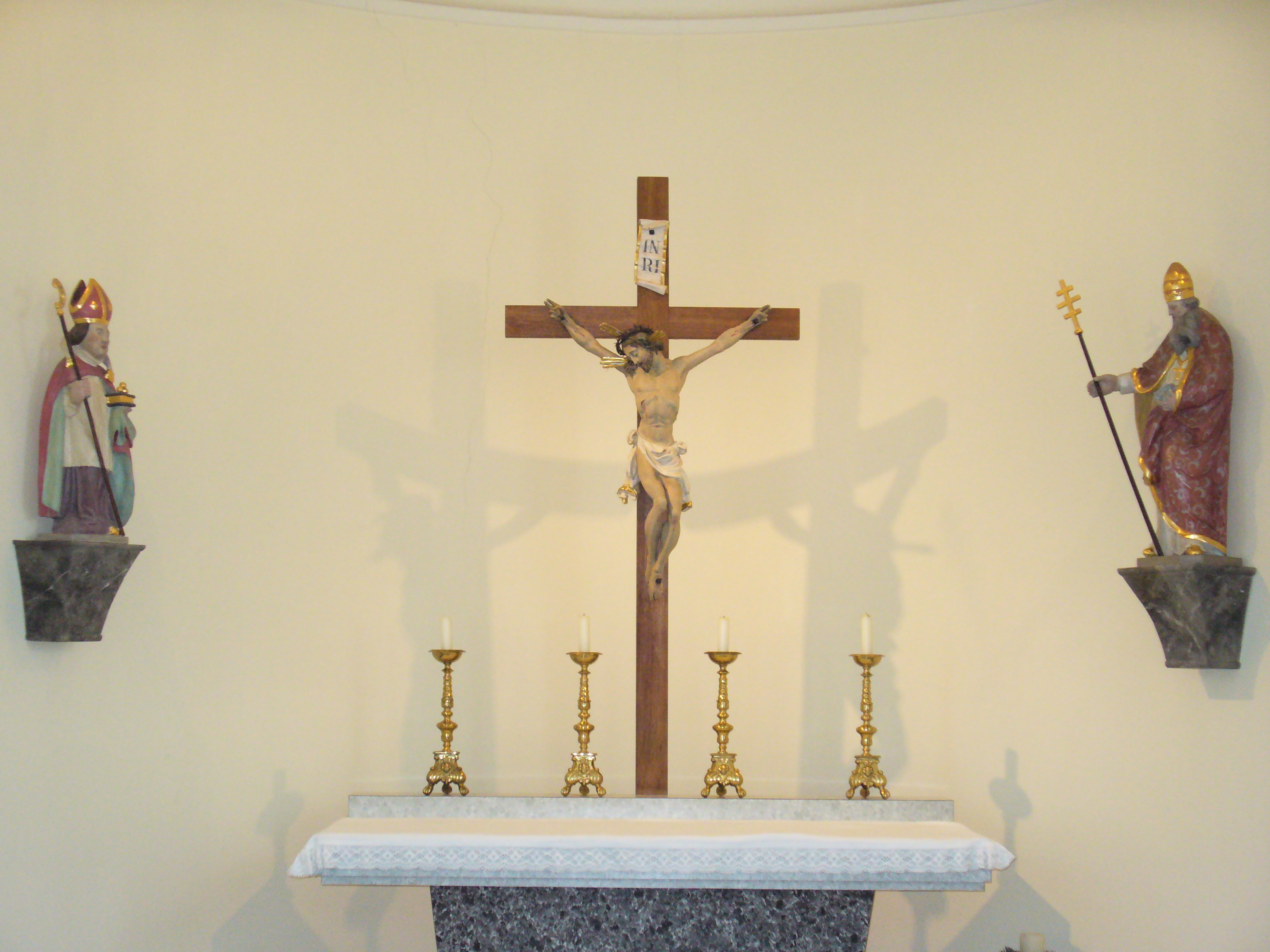
Altar of the chapel

A chapel dedicated to St. Nicholas is located very centrally in Hausen. Every five weeks there is a service in the chapel. The first chapel was built in 1592 and demolished in the 19th century. The existing chapel was built in 1853. The citizens contributed financially and helped build the chapel.
