= Wittislingen =

- Municipality
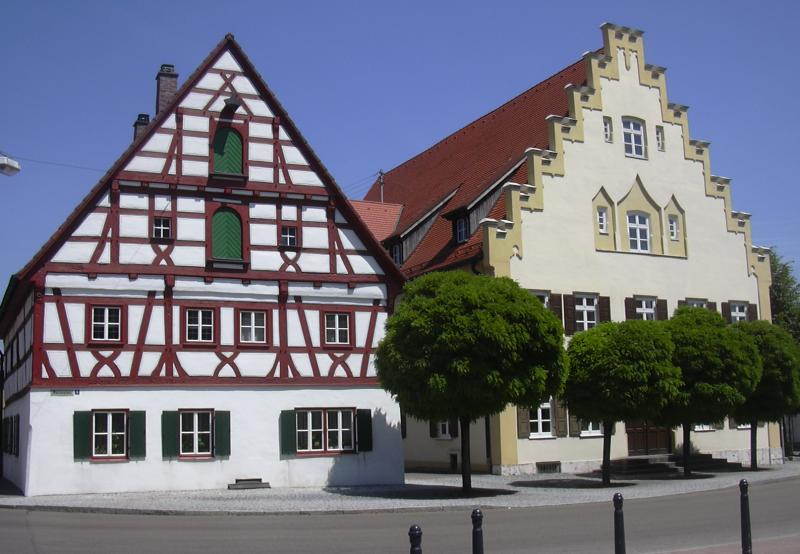
- Town centre of Wittislingen

- Coat of arms

- Location of Wittislingen within Dillingen district
- Interactive map of Wittislingen
- Location within Germany Location within Bavaria
- Coordinates: 48°37′N 10°25′E
- Country: Germany
- State: Bavaria
- Admin. region: Swabia
- District: Dillingen
- Municipal assoc.: Wittislingen

Government
  - Mayor (2020–26): Thomas Reicherzer (SPD)

Area
  - Total: 17.41 km^{2} (6.72 sq mi)
- Elevation: 450 m (1,480 ft)

Population (2025-12-31)
  - Total: 2,543
  - Density: 146.1/km^{2} (378.3/sq mi)
- Time zone: UTC+01:00 (CET)
  - Summer (DST): UTC+02:00 (CEST)
- Postal codes: 89426
- Dialling codes: 09076
- Vehicle registration: DLG
- Website: www.wittislingen.de

Wittislingen is a market municipality in the district of Dillingen in Bavaria, Germany. It is the seat of the Verwaltungsgemeinschaft Wittislingen together with Mödingen and Ziertheim.

== Geography ==
Wittislingen lies in the Egau valley on the southern edge of the Swabian Jura. The municipality covers 17.41 km^{2} (6.72 sq mi) and lies at around 450 m (1,480 ft) above sea level.

== History ==
=== Early history ===
A major find is the Wittislingen princely grave, a 7th-century burial of a high-status woman associated with the Merovingian period.

=== Medieval period ===
Wittislingen is recorded in early medieval sources as Uuittegislingua. The Vita of Saint Ulrich of Augsburg describes Bishop Ulrich staying in Uuittegislingua shortly before his death in 973. The account also refers to arrangements concerning church property in the settlement.

Control of the area in the Middle Ages was divided between the Duchy of Bavaria and the Bishopric of Augsburg.

== Demographics ==
The population is around 2,500 inhabitants (2023).

Population development
Year	Population
1871	1,262
1925	1,372
1950	2,133
1970	1,846–2,355
2011	2,306
2023	~2,550

== Economy ==
The economy of Wittislingen is mostly based on agriculture, dairy farming and mixed cultivation. Most residents commute to nearby towns for work.

== Transport ==
Wittislingen is connected by roads to Dillingen an der Donau, Lauingen, and the B16 corridor. There are local bus services, and the nearest railway stations are in Dillingen a.d. Donau and Lauingen.

== Events ==
=== Disappearance of Sri Lankan handball players ===
In September 2004, a 23-member (Note: Most sources reported that there were 23 people in the group, but Deutsche Welle reported that there were 24 people in the group, 16 players and 8 trainers.) group posing as a Sri Lankan national handball team disappeared after playing a match against TSV Wittislingen. The Sri Lankan players did not seem familiar with the game, and the Bavarian players described them as "awful".

A letter was found in their hotel room, thanking the Bavarians for their hospitality and claiming that the Sri Lankans had gone to France.

Two weeks later, a taxi driver told the police that he had brought the Sri Lankans to München Hauptbahnhof, along with a few other taxis. The match had been organised by an in Duisburg, which did not respond to the media. The Sri Lankan embassy in Berlin denied all knowledge of the group and the match, and the Sri Lankan sports ministry said the trip had not been authorised.

The 2008 film Machan was inspired by events.

=== Archaeological excavations ===
In 1881, archaeological excavations in the Wittislingen area uncovered a Merovingian burial site, later known for its high-quality grave goods and association with early medieval Alemannic elite culture.
