= Laugna =

- Municipality
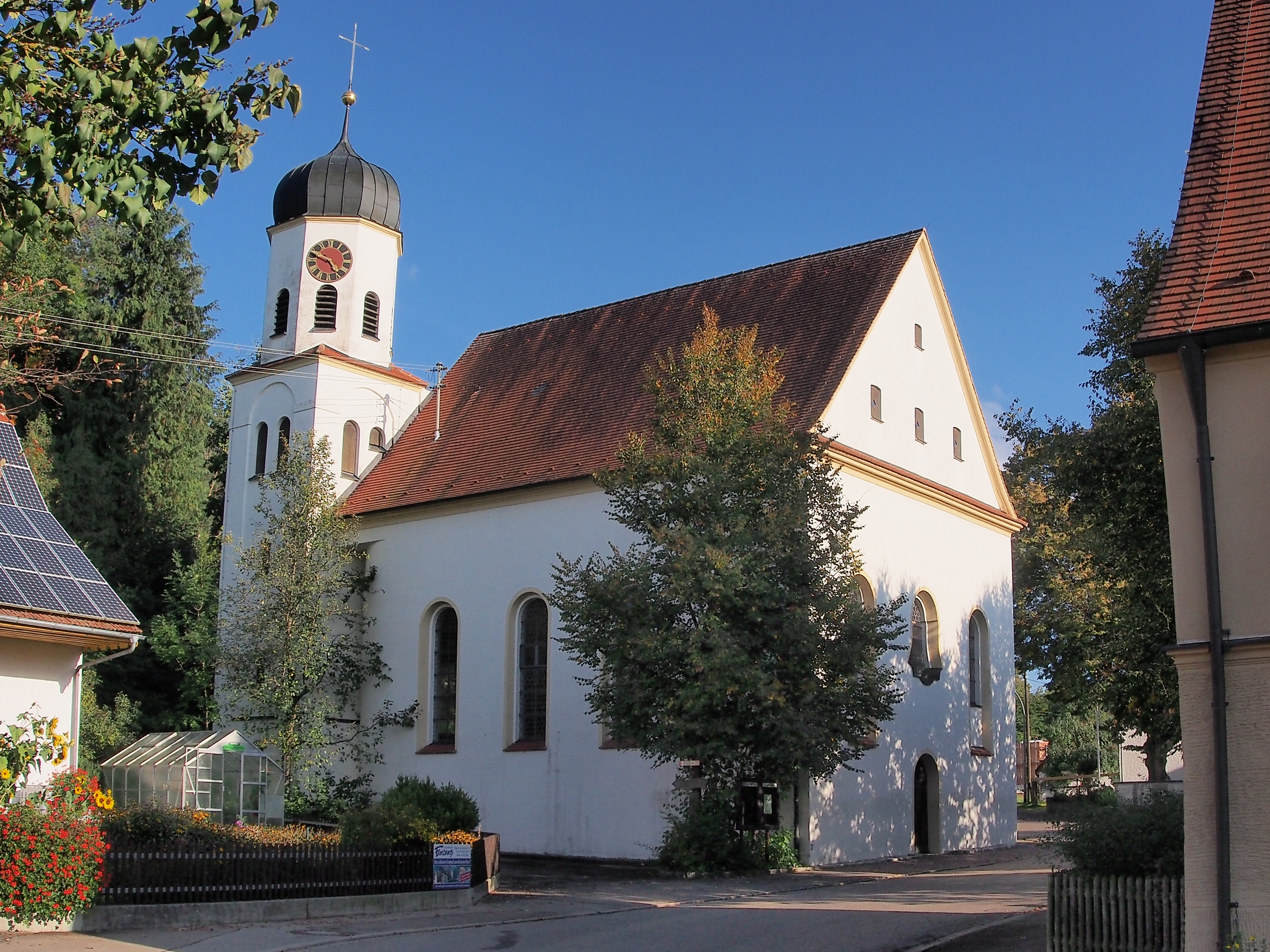
- Church of Saint Michael

- Coat of arms

- Location of Laugna within Dillingen district
- Interactive map of Laugna
- Location within Germany Location within Bavaria
- Coordinates: 48°32′N 10°42′E
- Country: Germany
- State: Bavaria
- Admin. region: Schwaben
- District: Dillingen
- Municipal assoc.: Wertingen

Government
  - Mayor (2020–26): Johann Gebele

Area
  - Total: 27.60 km^{2} (10.66 sq mi)
- Elevation: 442 m (1,450 ft)

Population (2025-12-31)
  - Total: 1,556
  - Density: 56.38/km^{2} (146.0/sq mi)
- Time zone: UTC+01:00 (CET)
  - Summer (DST): UTC+02:00 (CEST)
- Postal codes: 86502
- Dialling codes: 08272
- Vehicle registration: DLG

Laugna is a municipality in the district of Dillingen in Bavaria in Germany. The town is a member of the municipal association Wertingen.
