= Gymnasium Wertingen =

Coordinates: 48.565447°N 10.681647°E

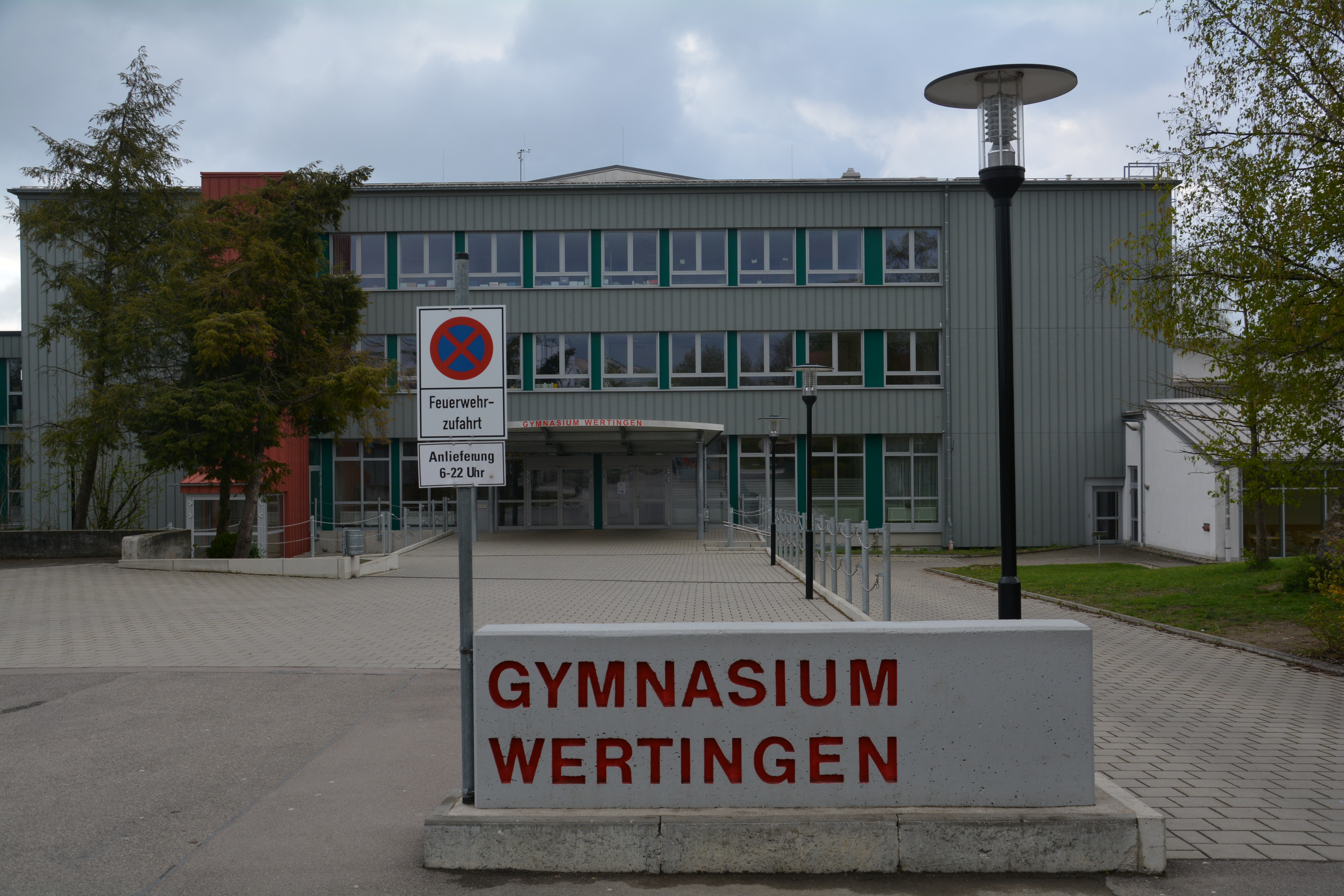
- Wertingen; Germany

Information
- Type: High-School
- Established: 26 November 1965
- Enrollment: 950
- Newspaper: Echo

The Gymnasium Wertingen is located in the Bavarian municipality of Wertingen. The High-School is attended by around 950 pupils. It is the biggest high school in the county of Dillingen.

== History ==
The High-School established at 26.11.1965. This was by the county council, which decided to build a new school. In October the same year the school began to teach children. At first there were 78 pupils and 13 teachers. The first headteacher was Ernst Rehle.

In 1979 the School Association was founded, 12 years later it got founded again. The school offered student exchanges with a school in Fère-en-Tardenois in France, with the Texas City High School and the Highland Park High School in Dallas, USA.

In 1997 the "AG Tanz und Gymnastik" won the Bavarian championship. In 2003 the school celebrated its 1500th high-school graduate. One year later the G8 was launched.

== Awards ==
In 2009 the school got named "School without racism - school with courage". With the Echo the school has one of the most successful school magazines in Germany. It often was a winner in Bavarian competitions.
