= Hausen =

Hausen may refer to:

== Places in Germany ==
=== Bavaria ===
- Hausen, Miltenberg, in the Miltenberg district
- Hausen, Lower Bavaria, in the Kelheim district
- Hausen, Upper Franconia, in the Forchheim district
- Hausen, Rhön-Grabfeld, in the Rhön-Grabfeld district
- Hausen, Villenbach
- Hausen, Greding, a locality in Greding, district of Roth
- Hausen bei Würzburg, in the Würzburg district
- Hausen bei Aindling, a locality of Aichach-Friedberg
- Hausen bei Augsburg, a locality in Diedorf, district of Augsburg
- Hausen bei Bad Kissingen, a locality in Bad Kissingen

=== Baden-Württemberg ===
- Hausen im Tal, in Sigmaringen district, in the former Principality of Fürstenberg
- Hausen am Tann, in Zollernalbkreis district
- Hausen vor Wald, in Schwarzwald-Baar-Kreis district
- Hausen im Wiesental, in Lörrach district
- Hausen an der Zaber, in Heilbronn district on the Württemberger Weinstraße
- Hausen an der Möhlin, Ortsteil of Bad Krozingen, Breisgau-Hochschwarzwald

=== Hesse ===
- Hausen (Frankfurt am Main); a city district of Frankfurt am Main

=== North Rhine-Westphalia ===
- Hausen, part of Heimbach in the district of Düren
- Hausen, part of Neunkirchen-Seelscheid in the Rhein-Sieg district

=== Rhineland-Palatinate ===
- Hausen (Wied), in the district of Neuwied
- Hausen, Birkenfeld, in the district of Birkenfeld

=== Thuringia ===
- Hausen, Thuringia, in the district of Eichsfeld

== Places in Switzerland ==
- Hausen, Meiringen, in the canton of Bern
- Hausen am Albis, in the canton of Zurich
- Hausen bei Brugg, in the canton of Aargau

== Other places ==
- Hausen (crater), crater on the Moon

== People with the name ==
- Friedrich von Hausen (c. 1155–1190), German poet
- Christian August Hausen (1693–1743), German mathematician
- Max von Hausen (1846–1922), German army officer
- Ivan Hausen (1927–2003), Brazilian track and field athlete
- Harald zur Hausen (1936–2023), German virologist
- Peter Hausen (1935–2012), German developmental biologist
