= Binswangen =

- Municipality
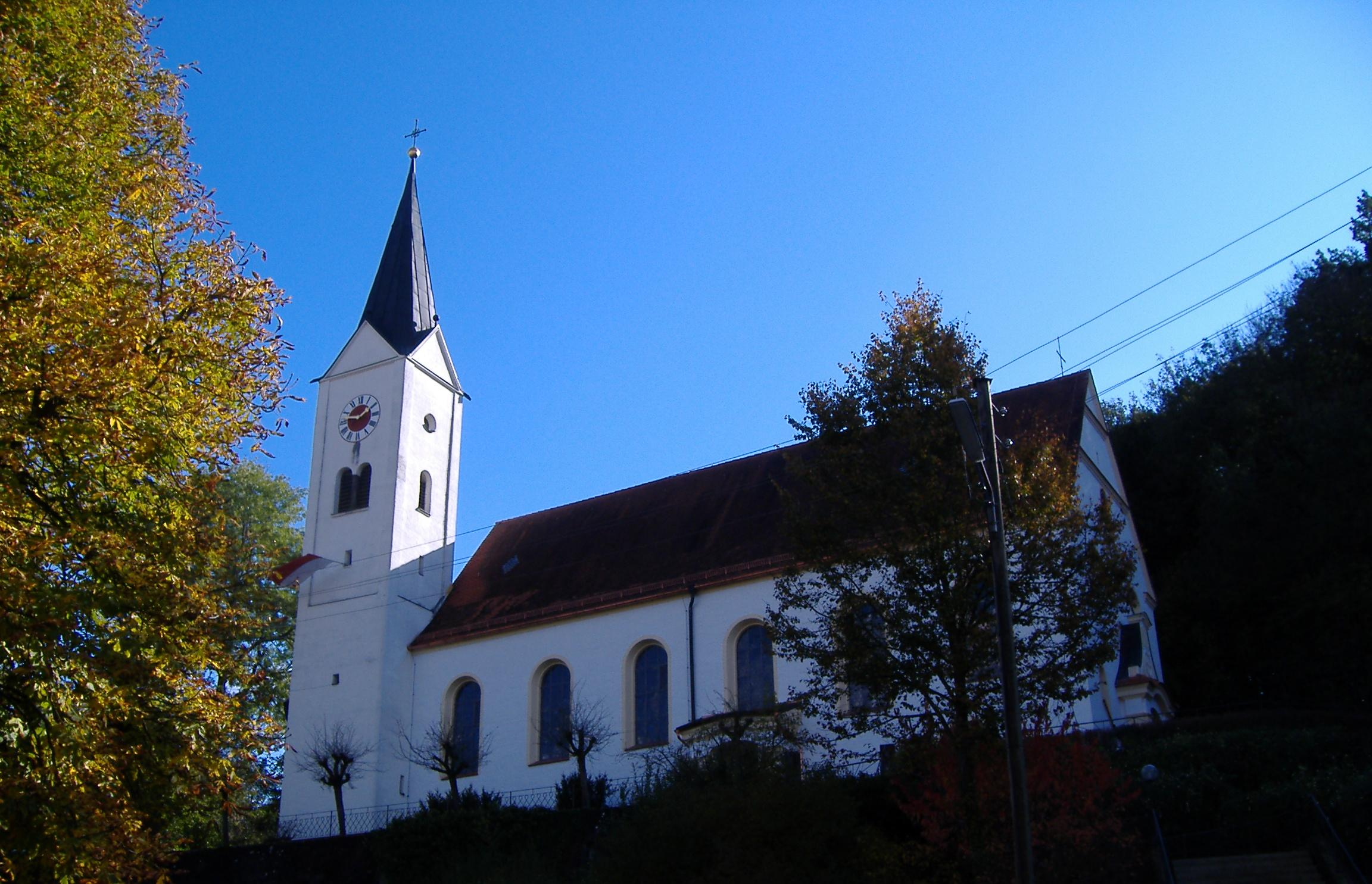
- Catholic parish Church of Saint Nicholas

- Coat of arms

- Location of Binswangen within Dillingen district
- Interactive map of Binswangen
- Location within Germany Location within Bavaria
- Coordinates: 48°34′N 10°39′E
- Country: Germany
- State: Bavaria
- Admin. region: Schwaben
- District: Dillingen
- Municipal assoc.: Wertingen

Government
  - Mayor (2020–26): Anton Winkler (FW)

Area
  - Total: 11.91 km^{2} (4.60 sq mi)
- Elevation: 440 m (1,440 ft)

Population (2025-12-31)
  - Total: 1,331
  - Density: 111.8/km^{2} (289.4/sq mi)
- Time zone: UTC+01:00 (CET)
  - Summer (DST): UTC+02:00 (CEST)
- Postal codes: 86637
- Dialling codes: 08272
- Vehicle registration: DLG
- Website: www.binswangen.de

Binswangen (German pronunciation: [ˈbɪnsvaŋən]) is a municipality in the district of Dillingen in Bavaria in Germany. The town is a member of the municipal association Wertingen.

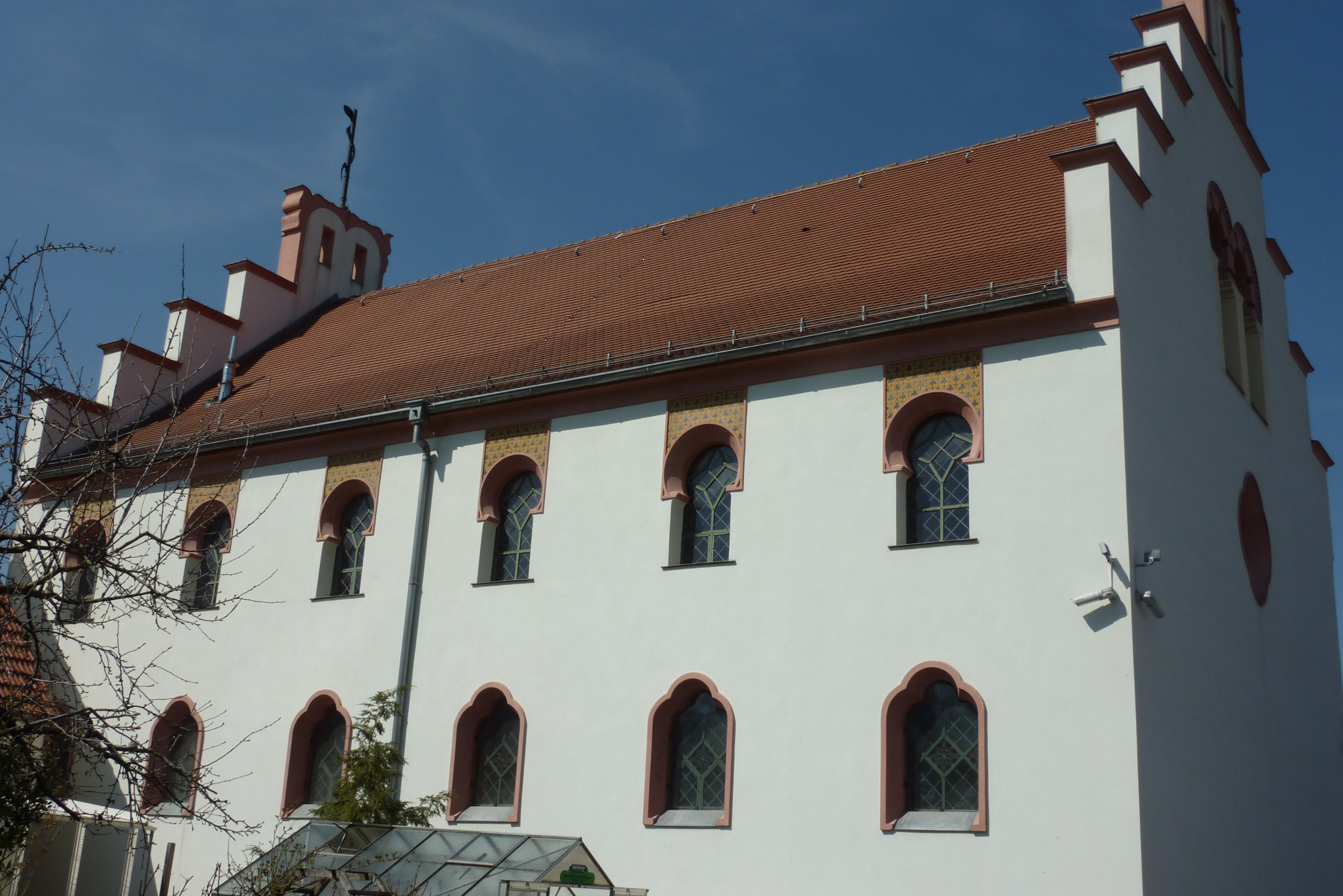
Binswangen synagogue

The town's 1836 synagogue, designed by Friedrich von Gärtner and notable as the first to use the horseshoe arch of Moorish architecture for windows and portals, was plundered in the Reichskristallnacht but not set ablaze because of its proximity to other buildings. It was restored beginning in 1987 and since 1996 has served as a community center, open to visitors on Sundays. Other remnants of Binswangen's former Jewish community, which dates back to at least 1609, are the memorial site of the Jewish cemetery destroyed by the Nazis and the landmark Schilling House (ca. 1840).

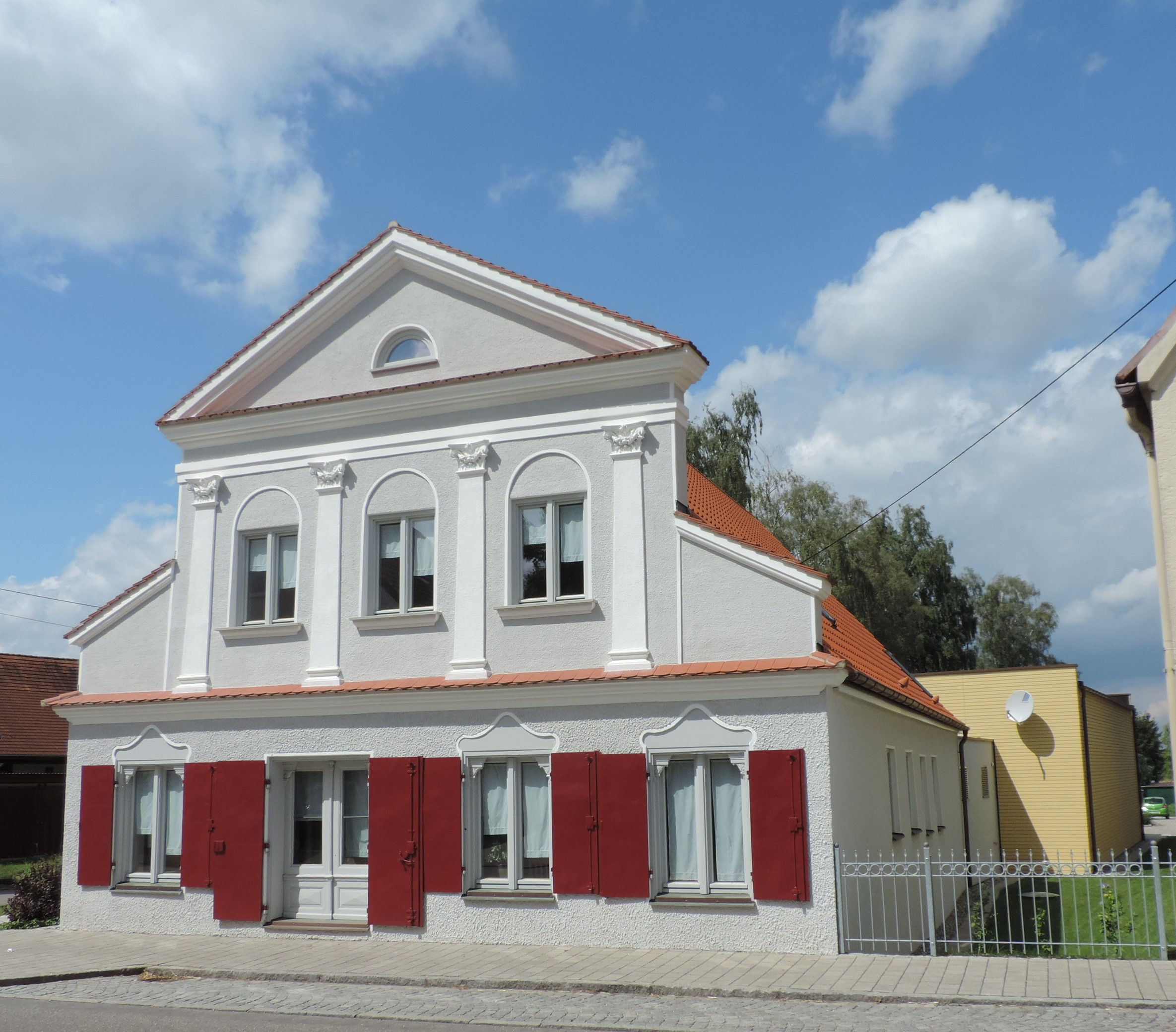
Schilling House
