= Reistingen Abbey =

Monastery in Ziertheim, Germany

Coordinates: 48°40′35″N 10°24′39″E

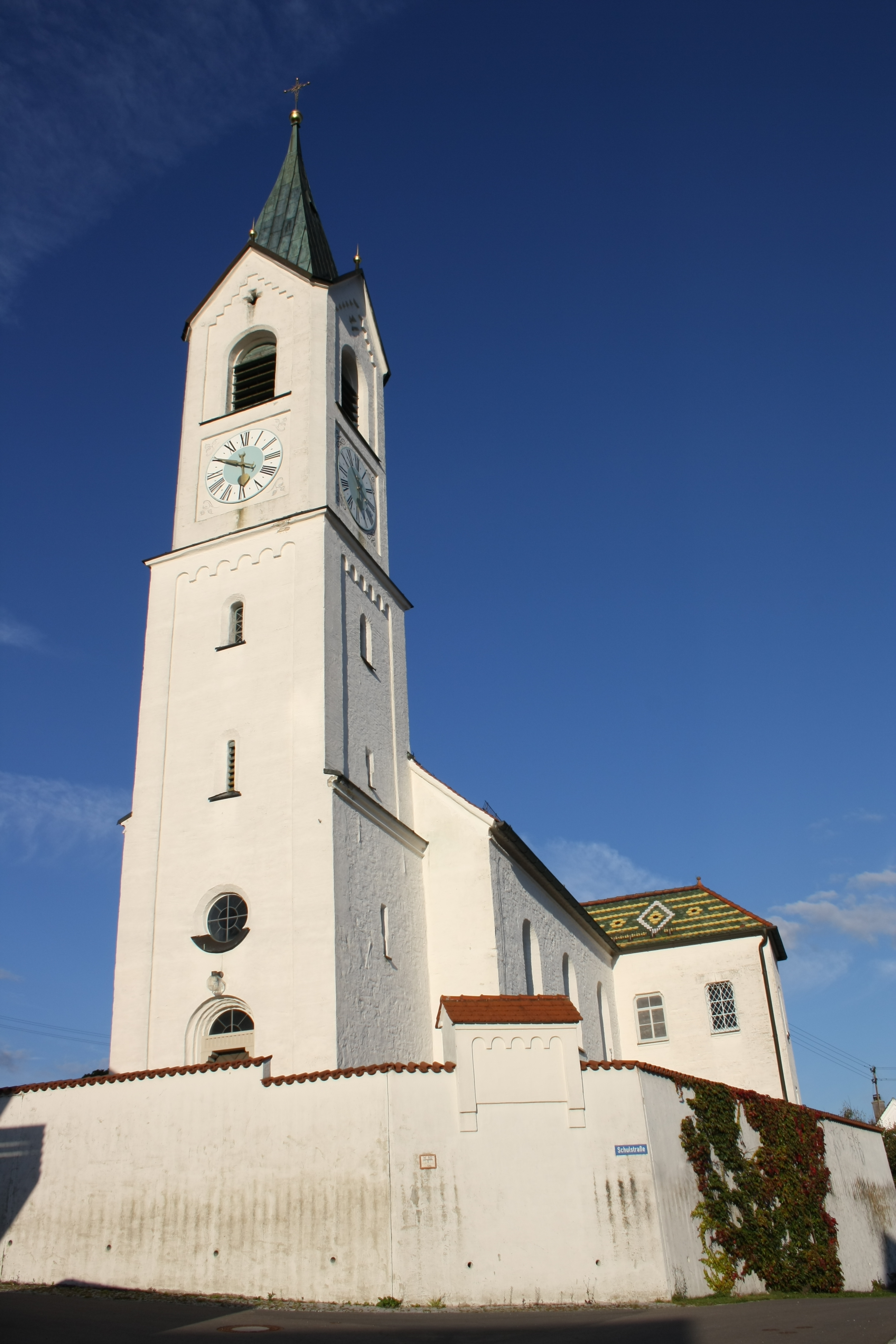
Former monastic church of St. Vitus

Reistingen Abbey (German: Kloster Reistingen) was a house of Augustinian canonesses, previously a Benedictine monastery, at Ziertheim in Bavaria.

== History ==
The monastery was founded at some time before 1250 by the Counts of Dillingen. In the 14th century it was dedicated to Saint Peter; the present church is dedicated to Saints Peter and Vitus. Until at least the middle of the 13th century it was a Benedictine monastery, but changed to a house of Augustinian canonesses in either the 13th or 14th century.

In 1450 Pope Nicholas V abolished the foundation and diverted the income to the use of the Bishop of Augsburg, in whose diocese it was. In 1465 the bishop used part of the income to buy liturgical books for the court chapel at Dillingen. The monastic and foundation church became the parish church.
