= Zusamaltheim =

- Municipality
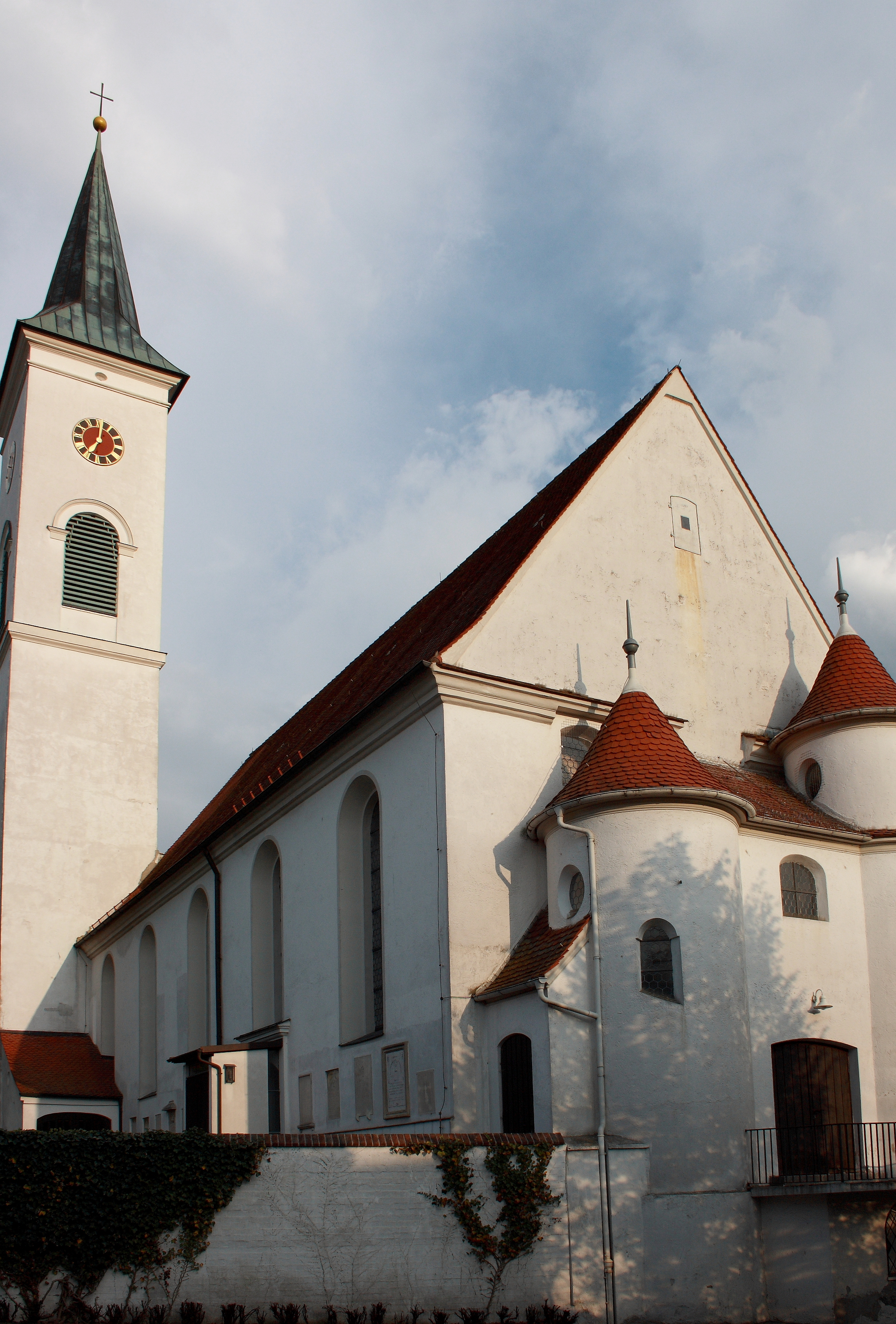
- Church of Saint Martin

- Coat of arms

- Location of Zusamaltheim within Dillingen district
- Interactive map of Zusamaltheim
- Location within Germany Location within Bavaria
- Coordinates: 48°32′N 10°38′E
- Country: Germany
- State: Bavaria
- Admin. region: Schwaben
- District: Dillingen
- Municipal assoc.: Wertingen

Government
  - Mayor (2020–26): Stephan Lutz

Area
  - Total: 17.90 km^{2} (6.91 sq mi)
- Elevation: 444 m (1,457 ft)

Population (2025-12-31)
  - Total: 1,308
  - Density: 73.07/km^{2} (189.3/sq mi)
- Time zone: UTC+01:00 (CET)
  - Summer (DST): UTC+02:00 (CEST)
- Postal codes: 89437
- Dialling codes: 08272
- Vehicle registration: DLG
- Website: www.zusamaltheim.de

Zusamaltheim is a municipality in the district of Dillingen in Bavaria in Germany. The town is a member of the municipal association Wertingen.

== Mayor ==
The mayor is Stephan Lutz, elected in March 2020.
