= Holzheim (Verwaltungsgemeinschaft) =

- Verwaltungsgemeinschaft
- Location of Holzheim within Dillingen district
- Interactive map of Holzheim
- Location within Germany Location within Bavaria
- Coordinates: 48°31′N 10°32′E
- Country: Germany
- State: Bavaria
- Admin. region: Swabia
- District: Dillingen
- Seat: Holzheim
- Subdivisions: 3 municipalities

Area
  - Total: 71.20 km^{2} (27.49 sq mi)

Population (2025-12-31)
  - Total: 6,193
  - Density: 86.98/km^{2} (225.3/sq mi)
- Time zone: UTC+01:00 (CET)
  - Summer (DST): UTC+02:00 (CEST)

Holzheim is a Verwaltungsgemeinschaft (municipal association) in the district of Dillingen in Bavaria, Germany. Its seat is in Holzheim.

It consists of the following municipalities:

1. Aislingen
2. Glött
3. Holzheim
