= Syrgenstein =

- Municipality
- Location of Syrgenstein within Dillingen district
- Interactive map of Syrgenstein
- Location within Germany Location within Bavaria
- Coordinates: 48°39′N 10°18′E
- Country: Germany
- State: Bavaria
- Admin. region: Schwaben
- District: Dillingen
- Municipal assoc.: Syrgenstein

Government
  - Mayor (2020–26): Mirjam Steiner (SPD)

Area
  - Total: 16.66 km^{2} (6.43 sq mi)
- Elevation: 485 m (1,591 ft)

Population (2025-12-31)
  - Total: 3,862
  - Density: 231.8/km^{2} (600.4/sq mi)
- Time zone: UTC+01:00 (CET)
  - Summer (DST): UTC+02:00 (CEST)
- Postal codes: 89428
- Dialling codes: 09077
- Vehicle registration: DLG
- Website: www.syrgenstein.de

Syrgenstein is a municipality in the district of Dillingen in Bavaria in Germany.
