= Holzheim, Dillingen =

Holzheim
- Municipality
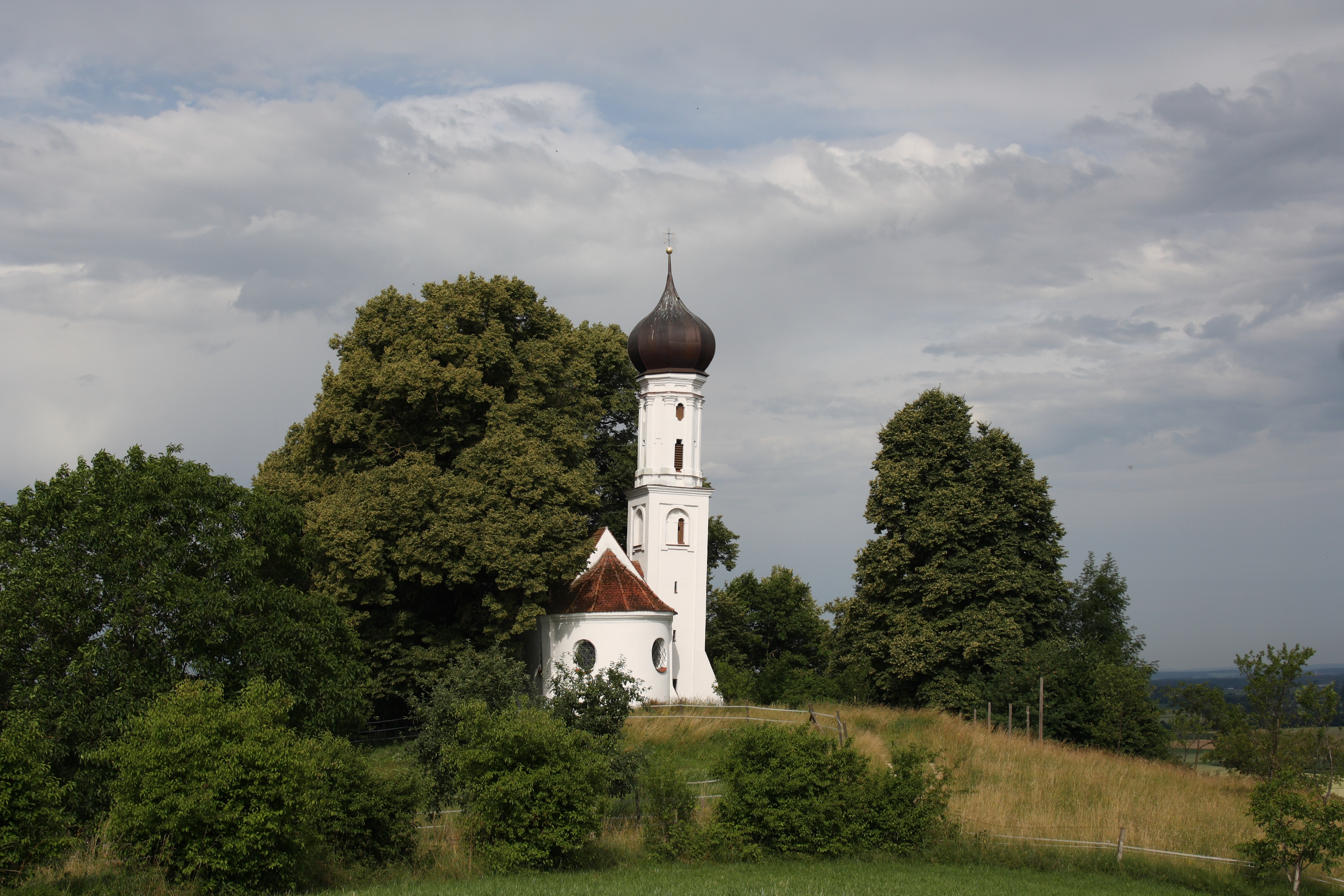
- Chapel of Saint Sebastian

- Coat of arms

- Location of Holzheim within Dillingen district
- Interactive map of Holzheim
- Location within Germany Location within Bavaria
- Coordinates: 48°31′N 10°32′E
- Country: Germany
- State: Bavaria
- Admin. region: Schwaben
- District: Dillingen
- Municipal assoc.: Holzheim

Government
  - Mayor (2020–26): Simon Peter

Area
  - Total: 40.86 km^{2} (15.78 sq mi)
- Elevation: 431 m (1,414 ft)

Population (2025-12-31)
  - Total: 3,752
  - Density: 91.83/km^{2} (237.8/sq mi)
- Time zone: UTC+01:00 (CET)
  - Summer (DST): UTC+02:00 (CEST)
- Postal codes: 89438
- Dialling codes: 09075
- Vehicle registration: DLG
- Website: www.holzheim.de

Holzheim (German pronunciation: [ˈhɔltshaɪm]) is a municipality in the district of Dillingen in Bavaria. Until its demolition in 1811, Fultenbach Abbey stood in the town.
