= Haunsheim =

- Municipality
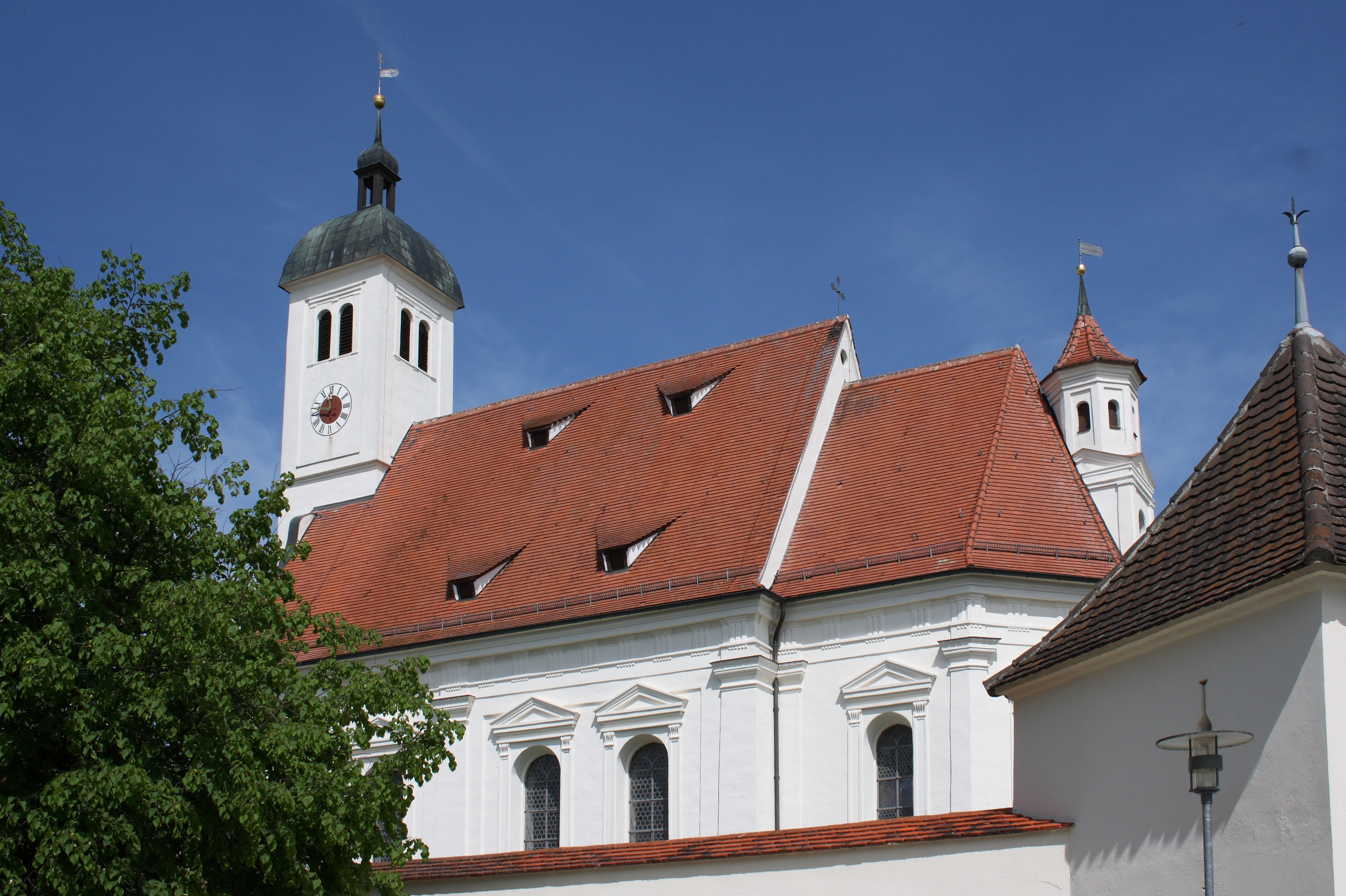
- Lutheran church of the Holy Trinity

- Coat of arms

- Location of Haunsheim within Dillingen district
- Interactive map of Haunsheim
- Location within Germany Location within Bavaria
- Coordinates: 48°36′N 10°22′E
- Country: Germany
- State: Bavaria
- Admin. region: Schwaben
- District: Dillingen
- Municipal assoc.: Gundelfingen an der Donau

Government
  - Mayor (2020–26): Christoph Mettel (CSU)

Area
  - Total: 17.79 km^{2} (6.87 sq mi)
- Elevation: 445 m (1,460 ft)

Population (2025-12-31)
  - Total: 1,583
  - Density: 88.98/km^{2} (230.5/sq mi)
- Time zone: UTC+01:00 (CET)
  - Summer (DST): UTC+02:00 (CEST)
- Postal codes: 89437
- Dialling codes: 09072
- Vehicle registration: DLG
- Website: www.haunsheim.de

Haunsheim is a municipality in the district of Dillingen in Bavaria in Germany. The town is a member of the municipal association Gundelfingen an der Donau.
