= Wertingen (Verwaltungsgemeinschaft) =

- Verwaltungsgemeinschaft
- Location of Wertingen within Dillingen district
- Interactive map of Wertingen
- Location within Germany Location within Bavaria
- Coordinates: 48°33′N 10°41′E
- Country: Germany
- State: Bavaria
- Admin. region: Swabia
- District: Dillingen
- Seat: Wertingen
- Subdivisions: 5 municipalities

Area
  - Total: 127.1 km^{2} (49.1 sq mi)

Population (2025-12-31)
  - Total: 14,999
  - Density: 118.0/km^{2} (305.6/sq mi)
- Time zone: UTC+01:00 (CET)
  - Summer (DST): UTC+02:00 (CEST)

Wertingen is a Verwaltungsgemeinschaft (municipal association) in the district of Dillingen in Bavaria, Germany. Its seat is in Wertingen.

It consists of the following municipalities:

1. Binswangen
2. Laugna
3. Wertingen
4. Villenbach
5. Zusamaltheim
