= Hubert Schonger =

German film director and producer (1897–1978)

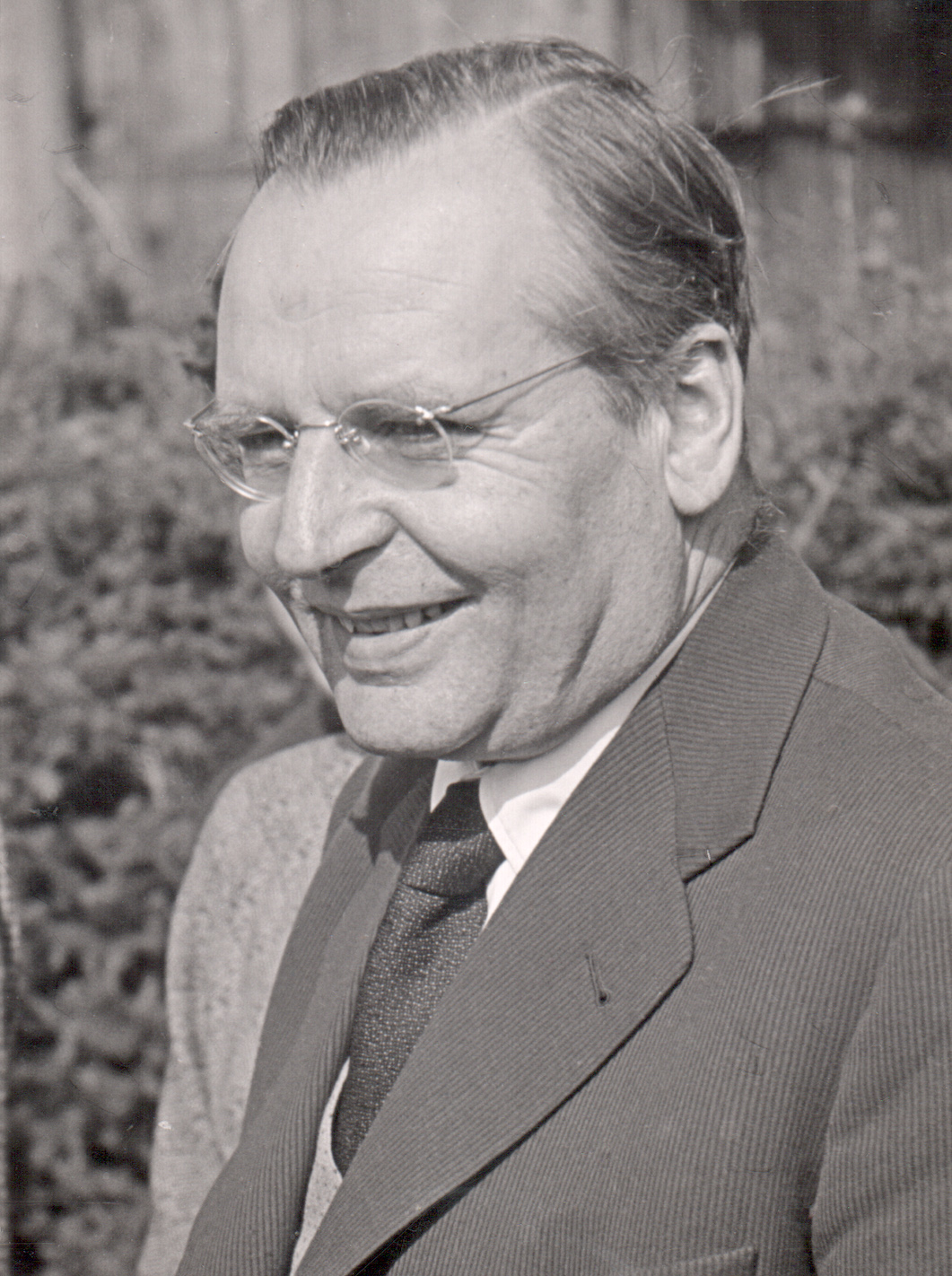
- Hubert Schonger
- Born: 19 October 1897; Bachhagel, Bavaria; German Empire
- Died: 21 February 1978 (aged 80); Inning am Ammersee, Bavaria; West Germany
- Occupations: Director, Producer, Screenwriter
- Years active: 1937 - 1969 (film)

Hubert Schonger (1897–1978) was a German film director, producer and screenwriter. He began his career working on documentaries, but in the late 1930s switched to producing animated films.

== Selected filmography ==
=== Producer ===
- Pulquebereitung in Mexiko (1936)
- Mountain Crystal (1949)
- Rübezahl (1957)
- Hunting Party (1959)

== Bibliography ==
- Giesen, Rolf & Storm, J.P. Animation Under the Swastika: A History of Trickfilm in Nazi Germany, 1933-1945. McFarland, 2012.
