= Villenbach =

- Municipality
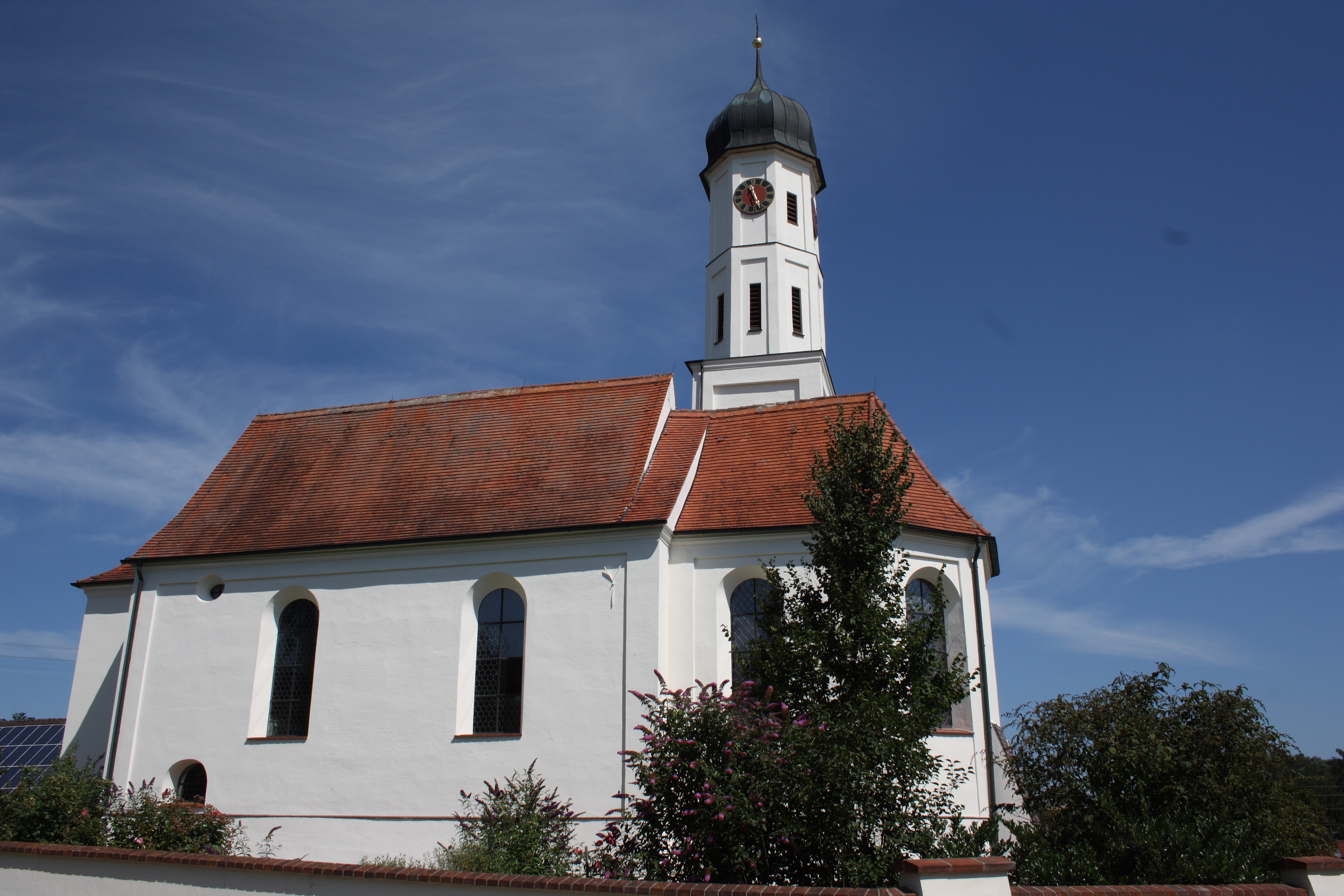
- Church of Saint Michael in Wengen

- Coat of arms

- Location of Villenbach within Dillingen district
- Interactive map of Villenbach
- Location within Germany Location within Bavaria
- Coordinates: 48°30′30″N 10°36′50″E
- Country: Germany
- State: Bavaria
- Admin. region: Schwaben
- District: Dillingen
- Municipal assoc.: Wertingen

Government
  - Mayor (2020–26): Werner Filbrich (FW)

Area
  - Total: 17.81 km^{2} (6.88 sq mi)
- Elevation: 437 m (1,434 ft)

Population (2025-12-31)
  - Total: 1,270
  - Density: 71.3/km^{2} (185/sq mi)
- Time zone: UTC+01:00 (CET)
  - Summer (DST): UTC+02:00 (CEST)
- Postal codes: 89637
- Dialling codes: 08296
- Vehicle registration: DLG
- Website: www.villenbach.de

Villenbach is a municipality in the district of Dillingen in Bavaria in Germany. The town is a member of the municipal association Wertingen.
