= Medlingen =

- Municipality
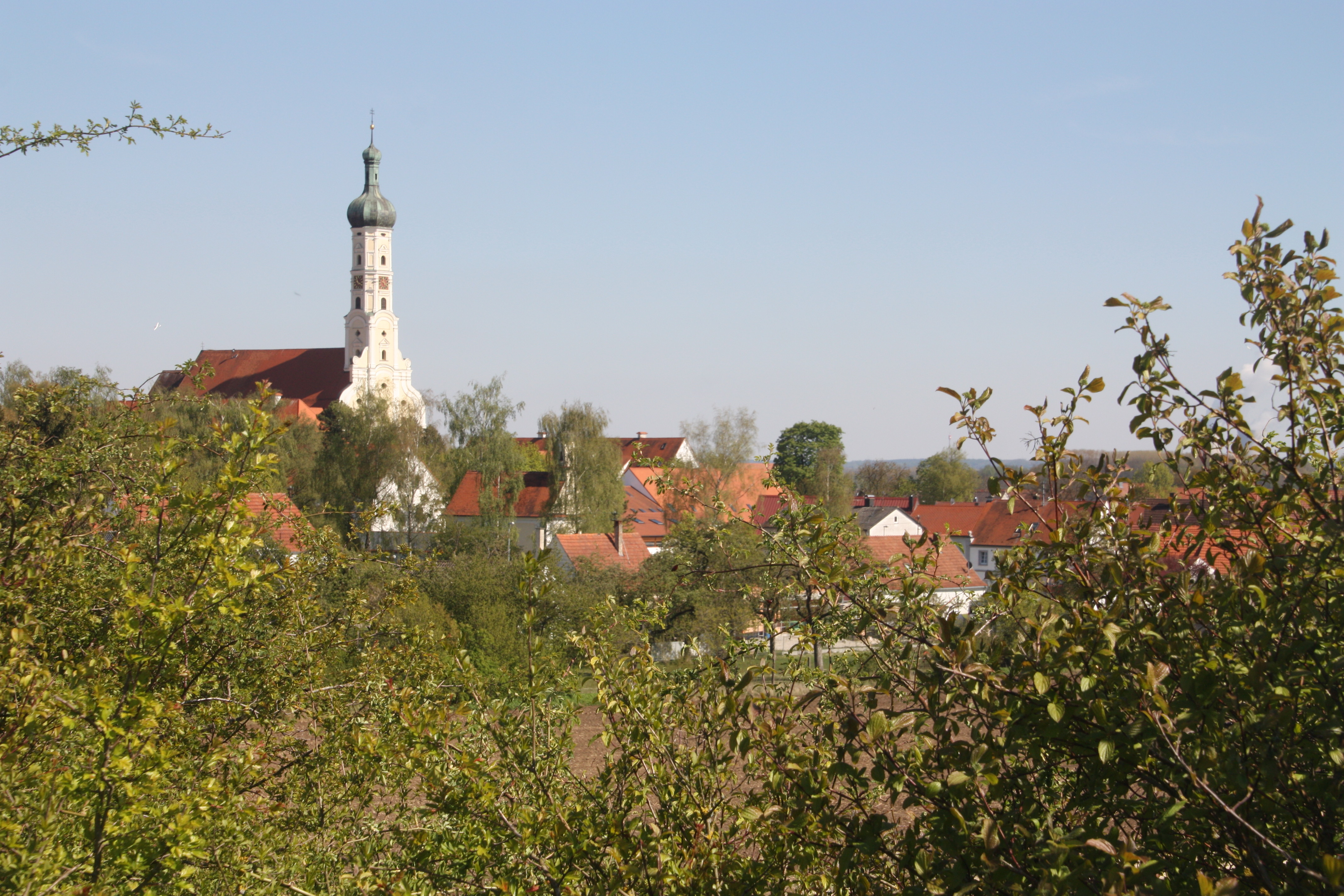
- Obermedlingen

- Coat of arms

- Location of Medlingen within Dillingen district
- Interactive map of Medlingen
- Location within Germany Location within Bavaria
- Coordinates: 48°34′N 10°19′E
- Country: Germany
- State: Bavaria
- Admin. region: Schwaben
- District: Dillingen
- Municipal assoc.: Gundelfingen an der Donau

Government
  - Mayor (2020–26): Stefan Taglang

Area
  - Total: 17.07 km^{2} (6.59 sq mi)
- Elevation: 433 m (1,421 ft)

Population (2025-12-31)
  - Total: 994
  - Density: 58.2/km^{2} (151/sq mi)
- Time zone: UTC+01:00 (CET)
  - Summer (DST): UTC+02:00 (CEST)
- Postal codes: 89441
- Dialling codes: 09073
- Vehicle registration: DLG
- Website: www.medlingen.de

Medlingen is a municipality in the district of Dillingen in Bavaria in Germany. The town is a member of the municipal association Gundelfingen an der Donau.
