= Wittislingen (Verwaltungsgemeinschaft) =

- Verwaltungsgemeinschaft
- Location of Wittislingen within Dillingen district
- Interactive map of Wittislingen
- Location within Germany Location within Bavaria
- Coordinates: 48°37′N 10°25′E
- Country: Germany
- State: Bavaria
- Admin. region: Swabia
- District: Dillingen
- Seat: Wittislingen
- Subdivisions: 3 municipalities

Area
  - Total: 61.25 km^{2} (23.65 sq mi)

Population (2025-12-31)
  - Total: 5,092
  - Density: 83.13/km^{2} (215.3/sq mi)
- Time zone: UTC+01:00 (CET)
  - Summer (DST): UTC+02:00 (CEST)
- Website: www.vg-wittislingen.de

Wittislingen is a Verwaltungsgemeinschaft (municipal association) in the district of Dillingen in Bavaria, Germany. Its seat is in Wittislingen.

It consists of the following municipalities:

1. Mödingen
2. Wittislingen
3. Ziertheim
