= Gundelfingen an der Donau (Verwaltungsgemeinschaft) =

- Verwaltungsgemeinschaft
- Location of Gundelfingen an der Donau within Dillingen district
- Interactive map of Gundelfingen an der Donau
- Location within Germany Location within Bavaria
- Coordinates: 48°33′N 10°22′E
- Country: Germany
- State: Bavaria
- Admin. region: Swabia
- District: Dillingen
- Seat: Gundelfingen an der Donau
- Subdivisions: 4 municipalities

Area
  - Total: 96.31 km^{2} (37.19 sq mi)

Population (2025-12-31)
  - Total: 11,715
  - Density: 121.6/km^{2} (315.0/sq mi)
- Time zone: UTC+01:00 (CET)
  - Summer (DST): UTC+02:00 (CEST)
- Website: vg-gundelfingen.de

Gundelfingen an der Donau is a Verwaltungsgemeinschaft (municipal association) in the district of Dillingen in Bavaria, Germany. Its seat is in Gundelfingen an der Donau.

It consists of the following municipalities:

1. Bächingen
2. Gundelfingen an der Donau
3. Haunsheim
4. Medlingen
