= Bachhagel =

- Municipality
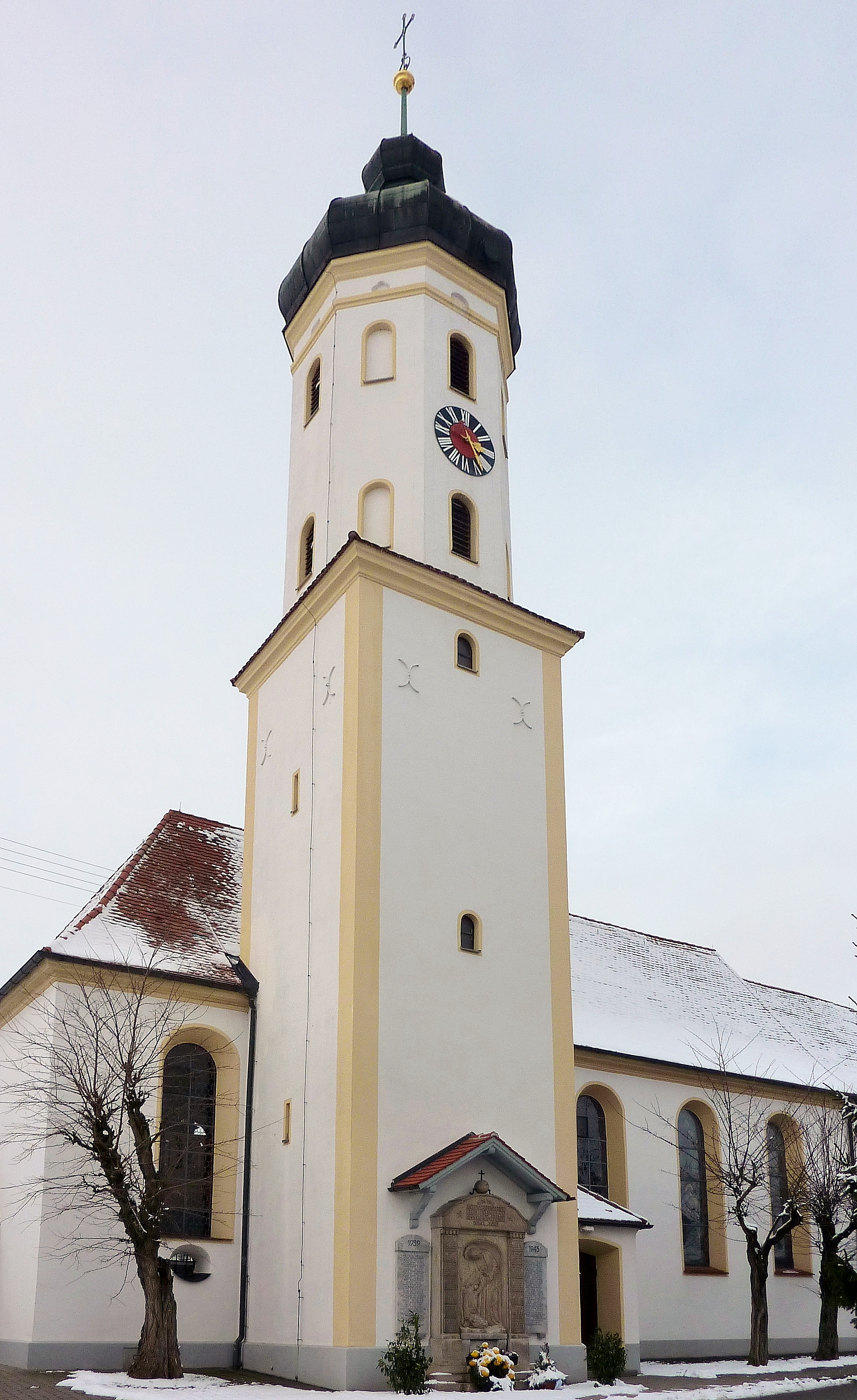
- Church of the Assumption of the Virgin Mary

- Coat of arms

- Location of Bachhagel within Dillingen district
- Interactive map of Bachhagel
- Location within Germany Location within Bavaria
- Coordinates: 48°38′N 10°19′E
- Country: Germany
- State: Bavaria
- Admin. region: Schwaben
- District: Dillingen
- Municipal assoc.: Syrgenstein

Government
  - Mayor (2020–26): Ingo Hellstern (CSU)

Area
  - Total: 19.72 km^{2} (7.61 sq mi)
- Elevation: 471 m (1,545 ft)

Population (2025-12-31)
  - Total: 2,282
  - Density: 115.7/km^{2} (299.7/sq mi)
- Time zone: UTC+01:00 (CET)
  - Summer (DST): UTC+02:00 (CEST)
- Postal codes: 89429
- Dialling codes: 09077
- Vehicle registration: DLG
- Website: www.bachhagel.de

Bachhagel is a municipality in the district of Dillingen in Bavaria in Germany. The current mayor is Ingo Hellstern.

== Sons and daughters of the municipality ==
- Ulrich Graf (1878-1950), national socialist politician, party official and member in SA and SS
- Hubert Schonger (1897-1978), film director and filmproducer.
