= Bächingen =

- Municipality
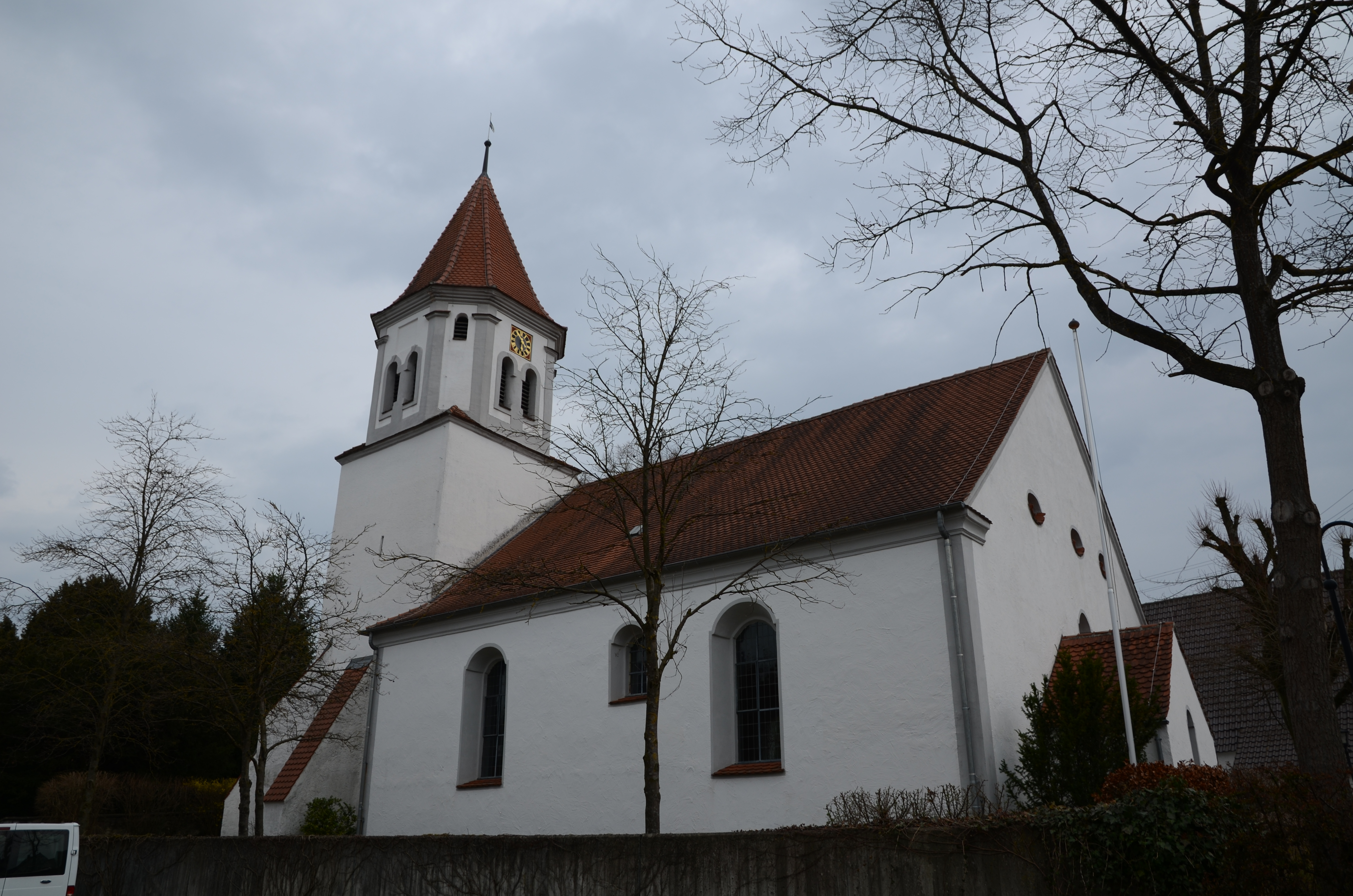
- Church of Saint Nicholas

- Coat of arms

- Location of Bächingen within Dillingen district
- Interactive map of Bächingen
- Location within Germany Location within Bavaria
- Coordinates: 48°32′47″N 10°18′46″E
- Country: Germany
- State: Bavaria
- Admin. region: Schwaben
- District: Dillingen
- Municipal assoc.: Gundelfingen an der Donau

Government
  - Mayor (2020–26): Siegmund Meck

Area
  - Total: 7.34 km^{2} (2.83 sq mi)
- Elevation: 440 m (1,440 ft)

Population (2025-12-31)
  - Total: 1,302
  - Density: 177/km^{2} (459/sq mi)
- Time zone: UTC+01:00 (CET)
  - Summer (DST): UTC+02:00 (CEST)
- Postal codes: 89431
- Dialling codes: 07325
- Vehicle registration: DLG
- Website: www.baechingen.de

Bächingen is a municipality in the district of Dillingen in Bavaria in Germany. The town is a member of the municipal association Gundelfingen an der Donau.
