= Pulquebereitung in Mexiko =

- Directed by: Hubert Schonger
- Production company: Reichsstelle für den Unterrichtsfilm
- Release date: 1936
- Running time: 12 minutes
- Country: Germany
- Languages: Silent; German intertitles

Pulquebereitung in Mexiko (in Spanish: La producción del pulque en México; in English: Pulque Production in Mexico) is a 1936 German documentary directed by Hubert Schonger. The film explores the history of pulque, its origins, and production.

The film was made as part of Nazi propaganda abroad, in order to attract more people to the regime's ideals.

== Plot ==
Pulque is a traditional Mexican alcoholic beverage dating back to pre-Columbian times. It is obtained from agave leaves and made from agave syrup. This beverage is believed to have medicinal properties, such as relieving gastrointestinal disorders and stimulating the appetite.

In the 1930s, Adolf Hitler and other Nazi leaders wanted to explore new cultural and culinary knowledge, due to Hitler's attraction to exotic foods that could maintain good health. So, after learning about pulque's health benefits, as well as its mythology, Hitler sent several German filmmakers to Mexico to further investigate the so-called "drink of the gods", which the dictator viewed as a kind of "magic potion" and an "achievement of the Aryan race".

== Filming ==
Filming took place at pulque haciendas in the municipality of Apan, in the state of Hidalgo, with the local tlachiqueros.

== Preservation status ==
When the Nazi regime collapsed in 1945, marking the beginning of the end of World War II, the documentary was supposedly lost. Decades later, in 2007, it was located in the Berlin Cultural Center. Later in 2020, the tape was purchased at auction by deceased Mexican businessman Javier Gómez Marín, a pulque fanatic. He offered US$70 for the film.
