= Syrgenstein (Verwaltungsgemeinschaft) =

- Verwaltungsgemeinschaft
- Location of Syrgenstein within Dillingen district
- Interactive map of Syrgenstein
- Location within Germany Location within Bavaria
- Coordinates: 48°39′N 10°18′E
- Country: Germany
- State: Bavaria
- Admin. region: Swabia
- District: Dillingen
- Seat: Syrgenstein
- Subdivisions: 3 municipalities

Area
  - Total: 51.01 km^{2} (19.70 sq mi)

Population (2025-12-31)
  - Total: 6,906
  - Density: 135.4/km^{2} (350.6/sq mi)
- Time zone: UTC+01:00 (CET)
  - Summer (DST): UTC+02:00 (CEST)
- Website: vg-syrgenstein.de

Syrgenstein is a Verwaltungsgemeinschaft (municipal association) in the district of Dillingen in Bavaria, Germany. Its seat is in Syrgenstein.

It consists of the following municipalities:

1. Bachhagel
2. Syrgenstein
3. Zöschingen
