= Buttenwiesen =

- Municipality
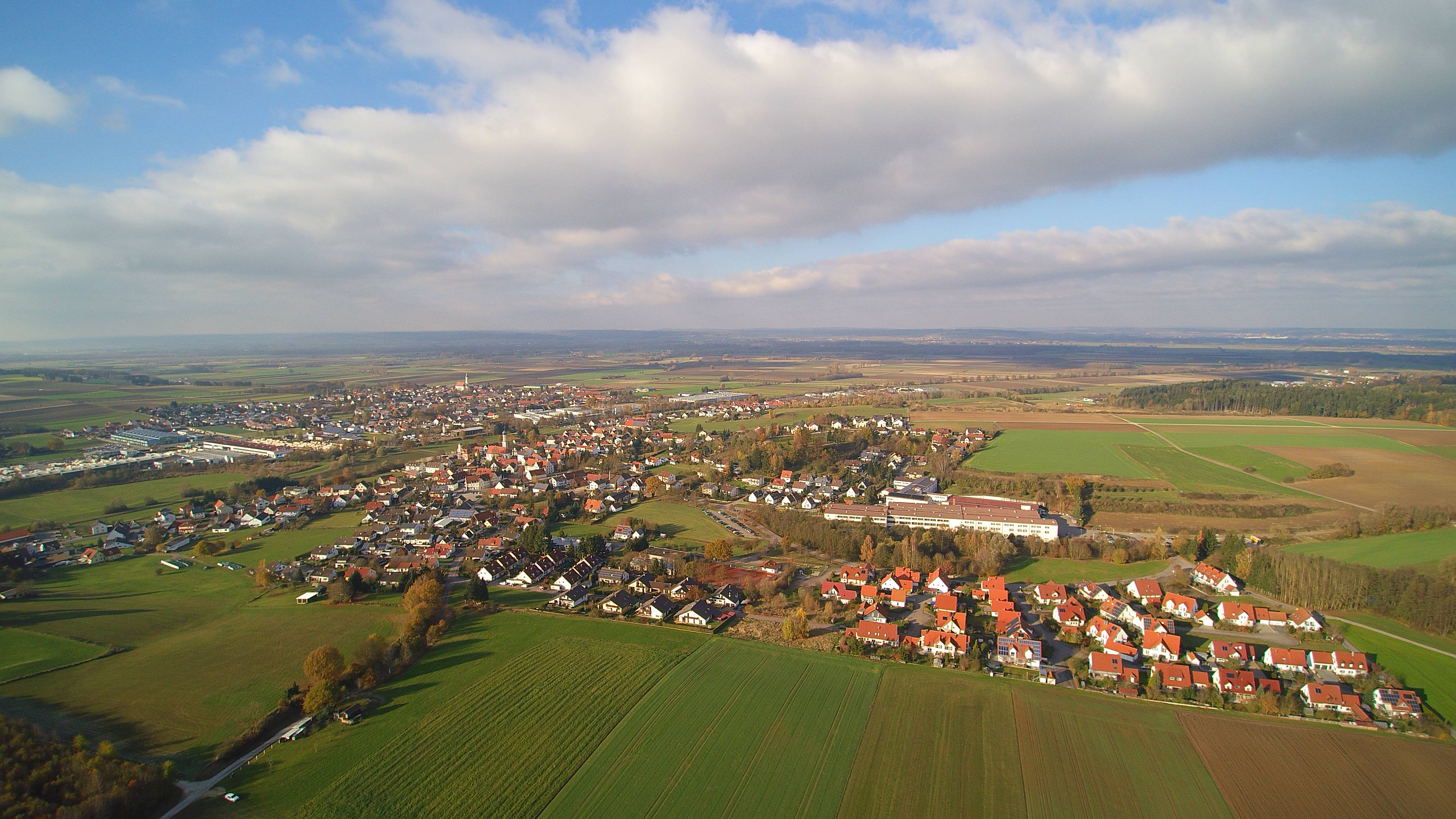
- Aerial view of Buttenwiesen

- Coat of arms

- Location of Buttenwiesen within Dillingen district
- Interactive map of Buttenwiesen
- Location within Germany Location within Bavaria
- Coordinates: 48°36′N 10°43′E
- Country: Germany
- State: Bavaria
- Admin. region: Schwaben
- District: Dillingen

Government
  - Mayor (2022–28): Hans Kaltner (CSU)

Area
  - Total: 59.49 km^{2} (22.97 sq mi)
- Elevation: 415 m (1,362 ft)

Population (2025-12-31)
  - Total: 6,124
  - Density: 102.9/km^{2} (266.6/sq mi)
- Time zone: UTC+01:00 (CET)
  - Summer (DST): UTC+02:00 (CEST)
- Postal codes: 86647
- Dialling codes: 08274
- Vehicle registration: DLG
- Website: www.buttenwiesen.de

Buttenwiesen is a municipality in the district of Dillingen in Bavaria in Germany.

== Community structure ==
The comune Buttenwiesen belongs to the region of Augsburg. The community consists the main town Buttenwiesen and the municipality parts Frauenstetten, Lauterbach, Oberthürheim, Pfaffenhofen an der Zusam, Unterthürheim and Wortelstetten.

== Facts ==
Area: The municipality of Buttenwiesen includes 6023 hectares and owns about 80 kilometers of community road.

Population Development: Since 1970 the population in Buttenwiesen is steadily increasing. In 1970 they counted 4490, in 1987 4864 and in 2000 5627 people. At the end of 2009 there were 5740 inhabitants. Currently it's about 6040 inhabitants.

Economy: In Buttenwiesen there are many companies. For example, the companies Erwin Müller Versandhaus GmbH, Romakowski GmbH & Co. KG, and the BauschLinnemann GmbH, which are quite important for the municipality.

Workstations:

In Buttenwiesen there are 1700 non-agricultural workstations, which leads to a solid economic position.

== History ==
In the 12th and 13th centuries Buttenwiesen was owned by the Lords of Eberstall-Reisensburg. In 1270 it became part of the Markgrafschaft Burgau, which had the power over Buttenwiesen up to the 19th century. In 1805 it became part of bavaria. In 1978 the municipalities of Buttenwiesen, Frauenstetten, Lauterbach, Oberthürheim, Pfaffenhofen a.d.Zusam, Unterthürheim and Wortelstetten were united to one comune called Buttenwiesen. In the 1970s existed the idea to build a nuclear powerplant in Pfaffenhofen a. d. Zusam. Only in 1999 this idea was cancelled. Before that they also had the idea of building a test track for transrapid. But the citizens who were against these plans luckily won.

== Politics ==
Between 2004 and 2016 Norbert Beutmüller (Member of the Free Voters Buttenwiesen) was the Mayor of Buttenwiesen. He succeeded Leo Schrell, who was elected for the District Administrator of Dillingen. In July 2010 Beutmüller was reelected in a runoff election with 54.88% of the votes. In June 2016 Hans Kaltner was elected mayor.

== Leisure facilities and museums ==
For the freetime there are many activities in about 90 clubs. Also there are many bike and hiking trails, the Heritage Museum in the Zehentstadel, asolar-heated swimming pool in Lauterbach, the Riedblickhalle and in the winter there is an ice rink.

== Education ==
Buttenwiesen has its own school. In Pfaffenhofen there is the Ulrich-von-Thürheim-Volksschule Buttenwiesen and for the younger children, there are five kindergartens.

== Renewable energy ==
Buttenwiesen is a rolemodel for other communities in relation to renewable energy. There are two solar parks, two biogas plants, three hydroelectric plants. Also the number of households, which are using solar energy is very high. Furthermore, produces the municipality on all of its public buildings solar energy.
