= Zöschingen =

- Municipality
- Coat of arms

- Location of Zöschingen within Dillingen district
- Interactive map of Zöschingen
- Location within Germany Location within Bavaria
- Coordinates: 48°40′N 10°19′E
- Country: Germany
- State: Bavaria
- Admin. region: Schwaben
- District: Dillingen
- Municipal assoc.: Syrgenstein

Government
  - Mayor (2020–26): Tobias Steinwinter

Area
  - Total: 14.60 km^{2} (5.64 sq mi)
- Elevation: 510 m (1,670 ft)

Population (2025-12-31)
  - Total: 762
  - Density: 52.2/km^{2} (135/sq mi)
- Time zone: UTC+01:00 (CET)
  - Summer (DST): UTC+02:00 (CEST)
- Postal codes: 89447
- Dialling codes: 09077
- Vehicle registration: DLG
- Website: www.vg-syrgenstein.de

Zöschingen is a municipality in the district of Dillingen in Bavaria in Germany.

== Mayors ==
Since 2014 Tobias Steinwinter (Gemeinschaftsliste) is the mayor. The predecessor was Norbert Schön.
