= Gundelfingen an der Donau =

- Town
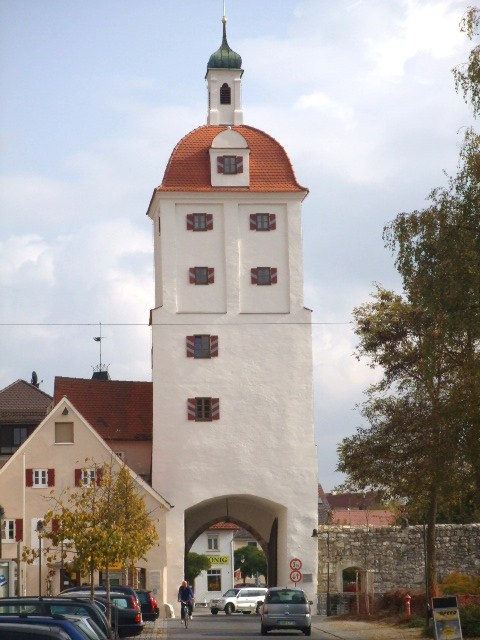
- Lower Tower Gate

- Coat of arms

- Location of Gundelfingen an der Donau within Dillingen district
- Interactive map of Gundelfingen an der Donau
- Location within Germany Location within Bavaria
- Coordinates: 48°33′N 10°22′E
- Country: Germany
- State: Bavaria
- Admin. region: Swabia
- District: Dillingen
- Municipal assoc.: Gundelfingen an der Donau

Government
  - Mayor (2023–29): Dieter Nägele

Area
  - Total: 54.06 km^{2} (20.87 sq mi)
- Elevation: 438 m (1,437 ft)

Population (2025-12-31)
  - Total: 7,836
  - Density: 145.0/km^{2} (375.4/sq mi)
- Time zone: UTC+01:00 (CET)
  - Summer (DST): UTC+02:00 (CEST)
- Postal codes: 89423
- Dialling codes: 09073
- Vehicle registration: DLG
- Website: www.gundelfingen-donau.de

Gundelfingen an der Donau (German pronunciation: [ˈɡʊndl̩ˌfɪŋən ʔan deːɐ̯ ˈdoːnaʊ], lit. 'Gundelfingen on the Danube'; Swabian: Gundelfinga) is a town in the Bavarian district Dillingen in Swabia. Gundelfingen is located at the river Danube (Donau), between Stuttgart, Munich and Augsburg (latitude 48° 33" 15' and longitude: 10° 22" 9'). It has some 8,000 inhabitants and still resembles the town of the Middle Ages. The town is the seat of the municipal association Gundelfingen an der Donau, which includes the towns Bächingen, Haunsheim and Medlingen.

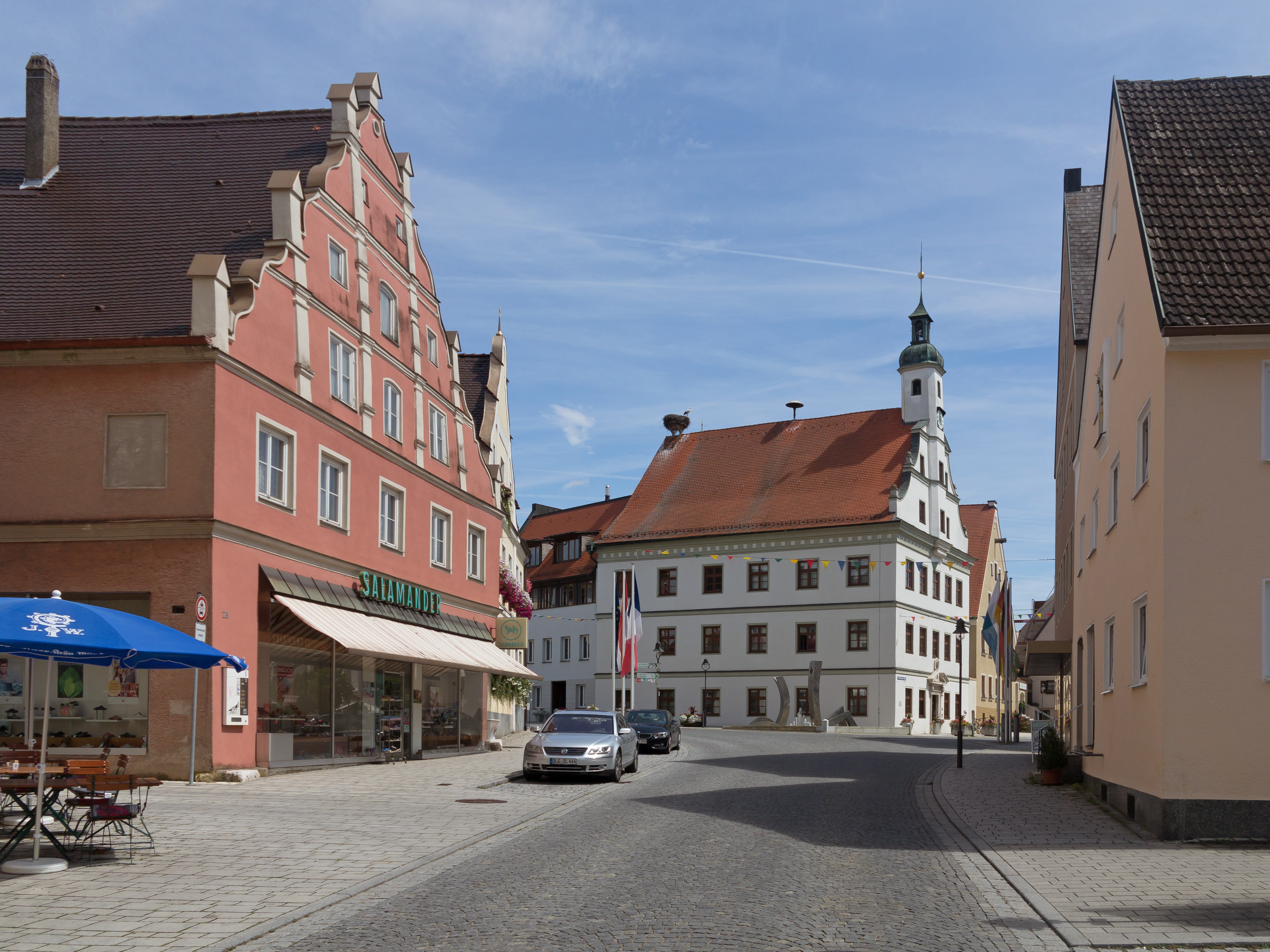
Das Bürgerhaus and the town hall

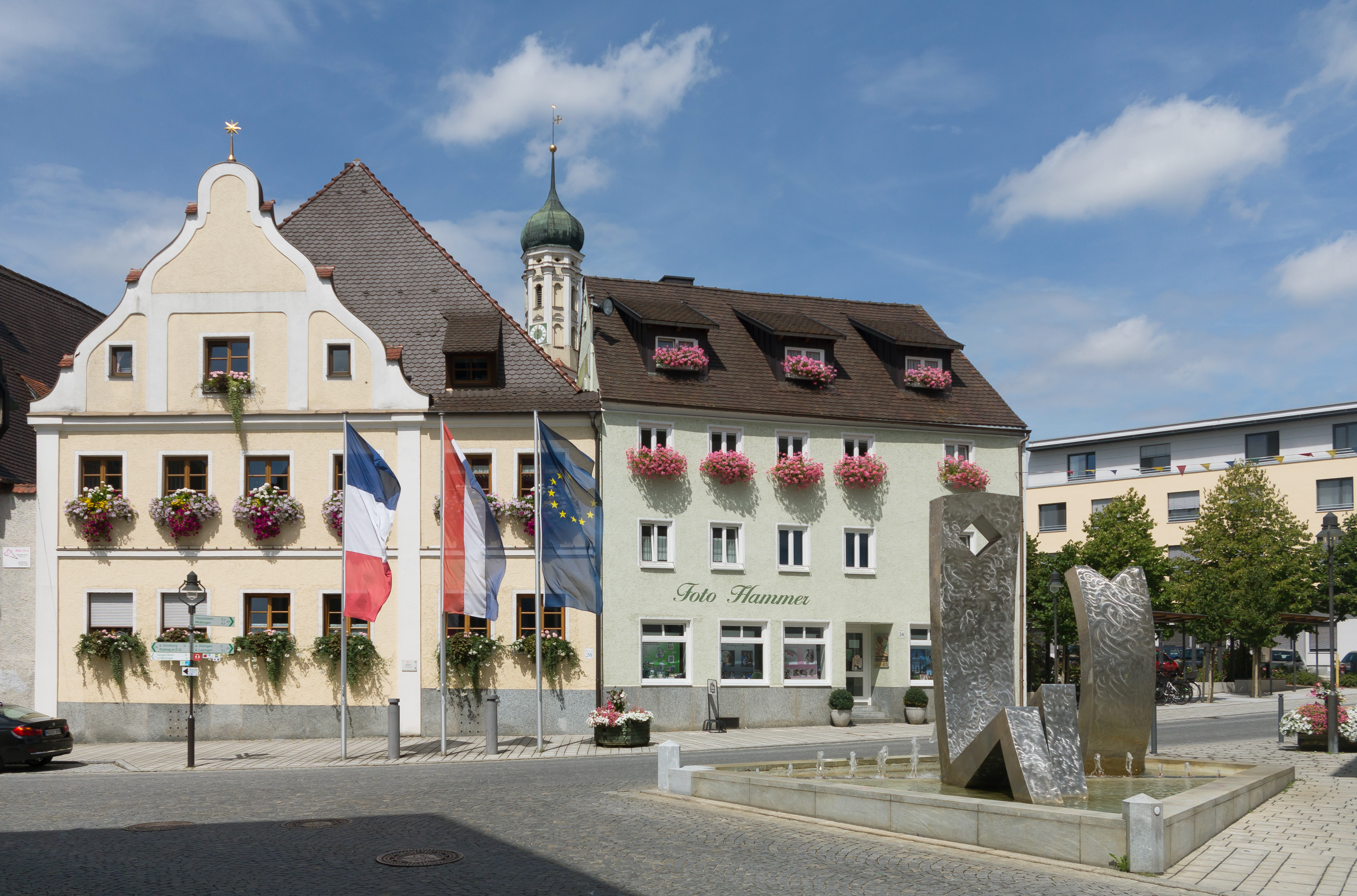
Sculpture with former Gasthaus
