= Aislingen =

- Municipality
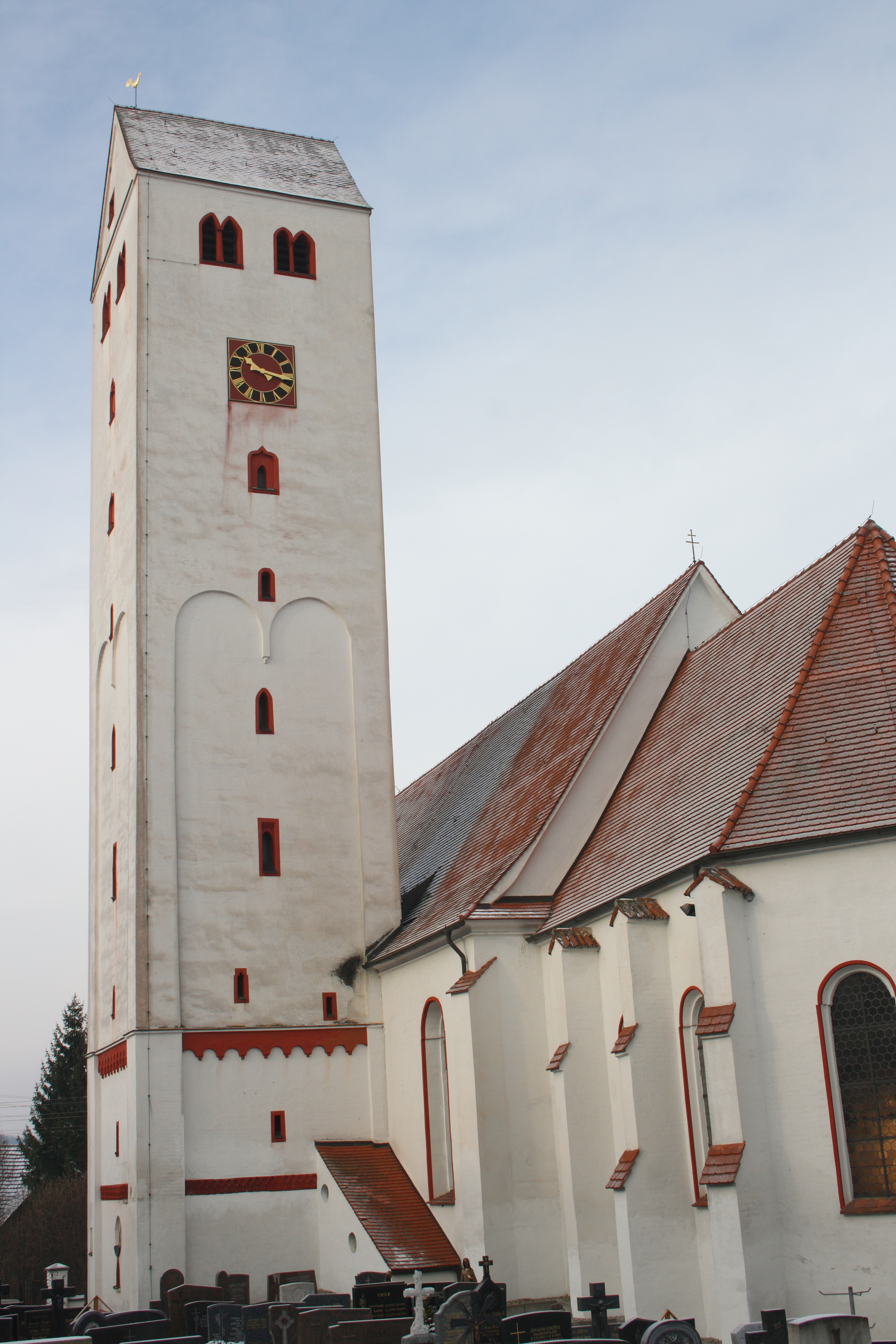
- Church of Saint George in Aislingen

- Coat of arms

- Location of Aislingen within Dillingen district
- Interactive map of Aislingen
- Location within Germany Location within Bavaria
- Coordinates: 48°30′N 10°27′E
- Country: Germany
- State: Bavaria
- Admin. region: Schwaben
- District: Dillingen
- Municipal assoc.: Holzheim

Government
  - Mayor (2020–26): Jürgen Kopriva

Area
  - Total: 19.35 km^{2} (7.47 sq mi)
- Elevation: 467 m (1,532 ft)

Population (2025-12-31)
  - Total: 1,356
  - Density: 70.08/km^{2} (181.5/sq mi)
- Time zone: UTC+01:00 (CET)
  - Summer (DST): UTC+02:00 (CEST)
- Postal codes: 89344
- Dialling codes: 09075
- Vehicle registration: DLG
- Website: https://www.aislingen.de/

Aislingen (German pronunciation: [ˈaɪslɪŋən]) is a municipality in the district of Dillingen in Bavaria in Germany.
