= Fultenbach Abbey =

Benedictine monastery in Holzheim, Germany

Coordinates: 48°29′23″N 10°34′29″E

Fultenbach Abbey (German: Kloster Fultenbach) was a Benedictine monastery located at Holzheim in Bavaria, Germany.

Dedicated to Saint Michael, the monastery was founded by Bishop Wigbert or Wikterp), the first documented bishop of Augsburg, who died in 771. It was dissolved in 1803 in the secularisation of the period, and the buildings were demolished in 1811. The monastery library was transferred to the Lyceum at Dillingen.
