= Ziertheim =

- Municipality
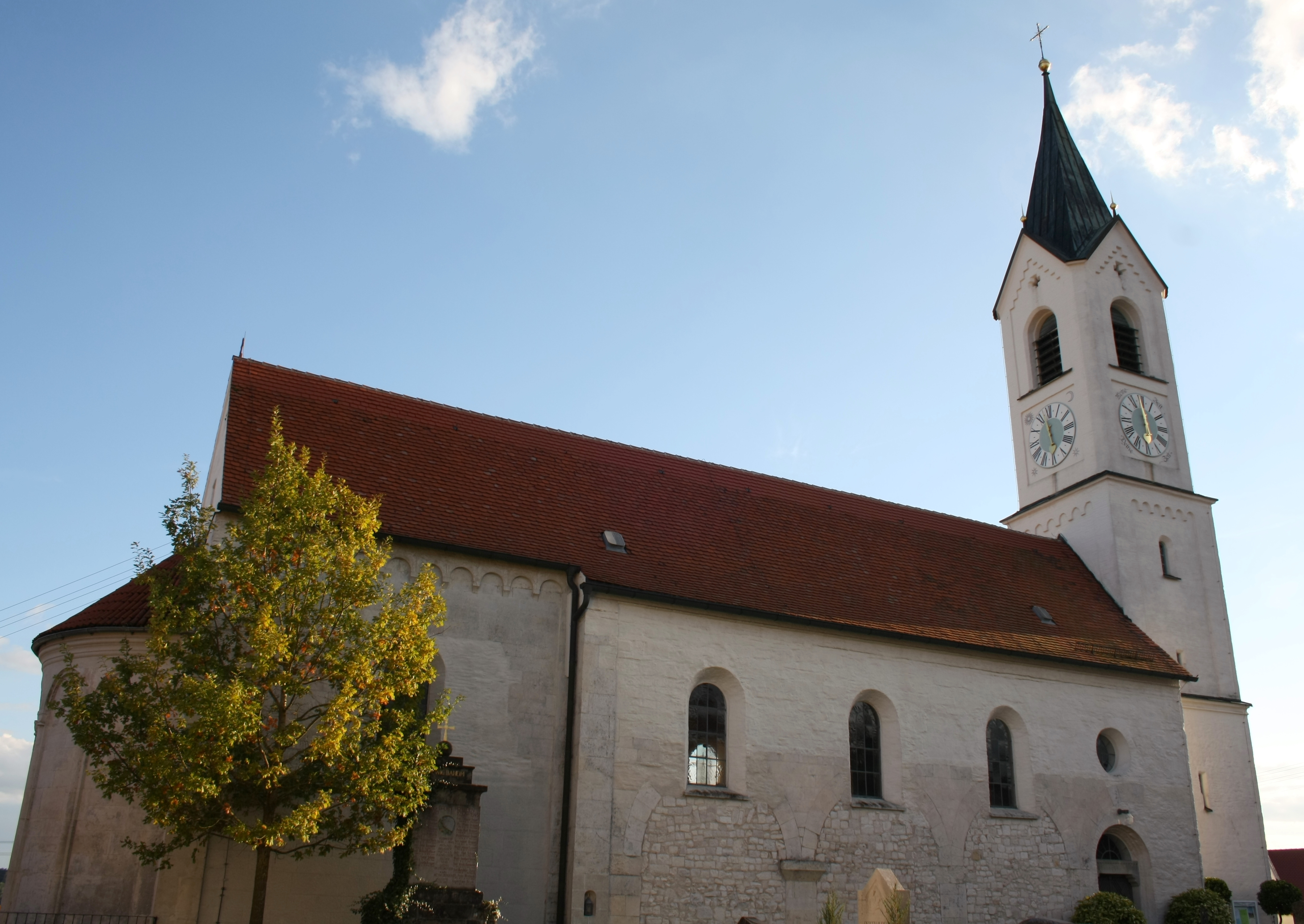
- Church of Saint Vitus in Reistingen

- Coat of arms

- Location of Ziertheim within Dillingen district
- Interactive map of Ziertheim
- Location within Germany Location within Bavaria
- Coordinates: 48°39′N 10°23′E
- Country: Germany
- State: Bavaria
- Admin. region: Schwaben
- District: Dillingen
- Municipal assoc.: Wittislingen

Government
  - Mayor (2020–26): Thomas Baumann

Area
  - Total: 20.83 km^{2} (8.04 sq mi)
- Elevation: 460 m (1,510 ft)

Population (2025-12-31)
  - Total: 1,133
  - Density: 54.39/km^{2} (140.9/sq mi)
- Time zone: UTC+01:00 (CET)
  - Summer (DST): UTC+02:00 (CEST)
- Postal codes: 89446
- Dialling codes: 09076
- Vehicle registration: DLG

Ziertheim is a municipality in the district of Dillingen in Bavaria in Germany.

== See also ==
- Reistingen Abbey
