= Mödingen =

- Municipality
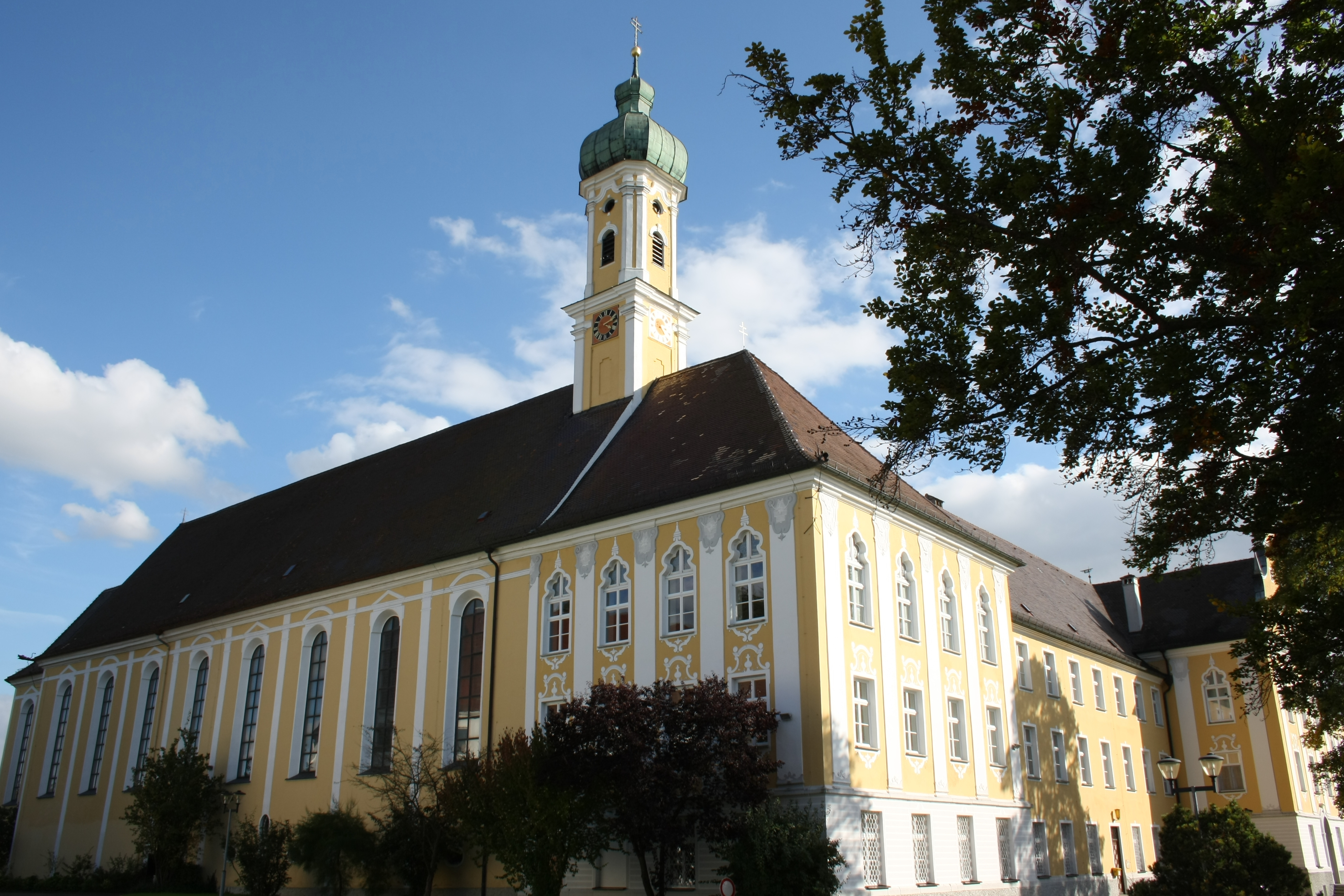
- Monastery church of Saint Mary

- Coat of arms

- Location of Mödingen within Dillingen district
- Interactive map of Mödingen
- Location within Germany Location within Bavaria
- Coordinates: 48°39′N 10°26′E
- Country: Germany
- State: Bavaria
- Admin. region: Schwaben
- District: Dillingen
- Municipal assoc.: Wittislingen

Government
  - Mayor (2020–26): Walter Joas

Area
  - Total: 23.37 km^{2} (9.02 sq mi)
- Elevation: 447 m (1,467 ft)

Population (2025-12-31)
  - Total: 1,416
  - Density: 60.59/km^{2} (156.9/sq mi)
- Time zone: UTC+01:00 (CET)
  - Summer (DST): UTC+02:00 (CEST)
- Postal codes: 89426
- Dialling codes: 09076
- Vehicle registration: DLG

Mödingen is a municipality in the district of Dillingen in Bavaria in Germany.

The municipality includes the villages Bergheim and Mödingen.
