= Dillingen (district) =

Coordinates: 48°35′N 10°25′E

- District
- Flag Coat of arms
- Country: Germany
- State: Bavaria
- Adm. region: Swabia
- Capital: Dillingen

Government
  - District admin.: Markus Müller (FW)

Area
  - Total: 792 km^{2} (306 sq mi)

Population (31 December 2025)
  - Total: 98,870
  - Density: 125/km^{2} (323/sq mi)
- Time zone: UTC+01:00 (CET)
  - Summer (DST): UTC+02:00 (CEST)
- Vehicle registration: DLG, WER
- Website: landkreis-dillingen.de

Dillingen is a Landkreis (district) in Swabia, Bavaria, Germany. It is bounded by (from the north and clockwise) the districts of Donau-Ries, Augsburg and Günzburg, and by the state of Baden-Württemberg (district of Heidenheim).

== History ==
In ancient times the Danube river was a border between the Roman Empire and the Germanic tribes north of the river. The Roman camp of Phoebiana (now Faimingen) was a bridgehead crossing the Danube. There was an Apollo temple being one of the largest buildings north of the Alps in that time.

In medieval times the county of Dillingen was established. The counts of Dillingen ruled from the 10th to the 13th century, then (1258) the territory was turned over to the Prince-Bishops of Augsburg, who gained several villages for their clerical state, hence subdividing the region into several patches, which were dissolved in the early 19th century. In 1804 Dillingen and its area became part of the state of Bavaria.

The district was established in 1972 by merging the former district of Dillingen (which had existed since 1804) with the western half of the former district of Wertingen. The city of Dillingen lost its status as a district-free city and became the capital of the newly established district.

== Geography ==
The district is crossed by the river Danube, which enters the district in the southwest and leaves to the east. All cities in the district except for Wertingen are located along the Danube.

== Coat of arms ==
The white lion was part of the arms of the medieval county of Dillingen. The black lion in the middle is taken from the arms of the dissolved district of Wertingen. The fleur-de-lis is from the arms of the city of Dillingen.

== Towns and municipalities ==
Clickable map of towns and municipalities in the district

Towns
1. Dillingen an der Donau
2. Lauingen
Markt
1. Bissingen
Municipalities
1. Buttenwiesen

Verwaltungsgemeinschaften
1. Gundelfingen an der Donau; 1. Bächingen; 2. Gundelfingen an der Donau^{1,2}; 3. Haunsheim; 4. Medlingen; 2. Höchstädt an der Donau; 1. Blindheim; 2. Finningen; 3. Höchstädt an der Donau^{1,2}; 4. Lutzingen; 5. Schwenningen	3. Holzheim; 1. Aislingen^{3}; 2. Glött; 3. Holzheim^{1}; 4. Syrgenstein; 1. Bachhagel; 2. Syrgenstein^{1}; 3. Zöschingen	5. Wertingen; 1. Binswangen; 2. Laugna; 3. Wertingen^{1,2}; 4. Villenbach; 5. Zusamaltheim; 6. Wittislingen; 1. Mödingen; 2. Wittislingen^{1,3}; 3. Ziertheim
^{1}seat of the Verwaltungsgemeinschaft; ^{2}town; ^{3}Markt
