= Wertingen =

- Town
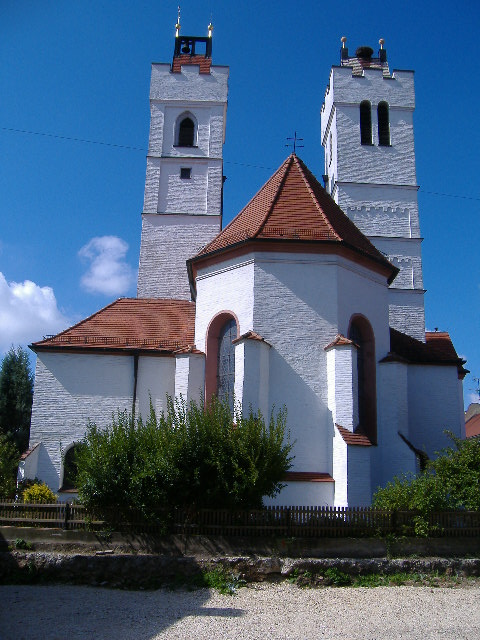
- Church of Saint Martin with its characteristic towers

- Coat of arms

- Location of Wertingen within Dillingen district
- Interactive map of Wertingen
- Location within Germany Location within Bavaria
- Coordinates: 48°32′N 10°40′E
- Country: Germany
- State: Bavaria
- Admin. region: Schwaben
- District: Dillingen
- Municipal assoc.: Wertingen

Government
  - Mayor (2020–26): Willy Lehmeier (FW)

Area
  - Total: 51.88 km^{2} (20.03 sq mi)
- Elevation: 421 m (1,381 ft)

Population (2025-12-31)
  - Total: 9,534
  - Density: 183.8/km^{2} (476.0/sq mi)
- Time zone: UTC+01:00 (CET)
  - Summer (DST): UTC+02:00 (CEST)
- Postal codes: 86637
- Dialling codes: 08272
- Vehicle registration: DLG, WER
- Website: www.wertingen.de

Wertingen (German pronunciation: [ˈvɛʁtɪŋən]) is a town in the district of Dillingen in Bavaria, Germany. It is located along the river Zusam in 13 km east of Dillingen, and 28 km northwest of Augsburg. The city is the seat of the municipal association Wertingen.

== See also ==
- Battle of Wertingen
- Gymnasium Wertingen
