= Pasqua Rosée =

Owner of the first coffee-house in London

Pasqua Rosée (fl. 1651–1658) was a 17th-century servant who opened the first coffee-house in London and possibly Britain. He was born into the ethnic Greek community of the Republic of Ragusa (now southernmost Croatia). In 1651 he became the servant of Daniel Edwards, an English merchant of the Levant Company who was living in Smyrna (modern İzmir, Turkey) in the Ottoman Empire; Rosée's duties included preparing and serving Edwards's daily coffee.

In late 1651 Edwards returned to London, taking Rosée with him. The number and frequency of friends visiting Edwards to drink coffee with him disrupted his social life, and so he set up Rosée as the proprietor of a coffee-house near the Royal Exchange. As Rosée was not a freeman of the City of London he was not able to trade; accordingly Edwards made his father-in-law's former apprentice, Christopher "Kitt" Bowman—a freeman of the City—join Rosée as a partner. The last known reference to Rosée was in 1658, after which Bowman ran the coffee-house with his wife until his death in 1662. There are stories that Rosée left London as a result of a misdemeanour and that he went to Holland or Germany to sell coffee, although there is no evidence this was the case.

The number of coffee-houses grew rapidly after Rosée opened his outlet. By 1708 there were 500–600 in London and Westminster, and others in provincial cities. The original premises of the coffee-house was destroyed in the 1666 Great Fire of London. On its location is a late nineteenth-century building housing—in the twenty-first century—a pub, the Jamaica Wine House; a commemorative plaque is now on the spot, unveiled in 1952—the tercentenary of the founding of Rosée's shop.

== Biography ==
=== Background and work in Smyrna ===
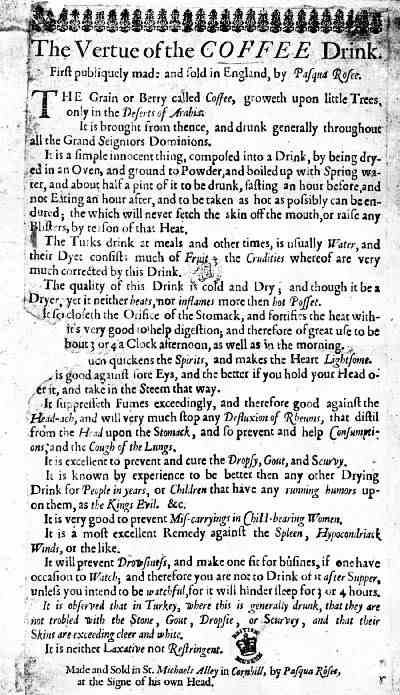
"The Vertue of the Coffee Drink", published by Rosée in 1652

Pasqua Rosée was born in the early seventeenth century into the ethnic Greek community of the Republic of Ragusa (now southernmost Croatia), and is variously described as Greek, Armenian, Turkish and "of Greek or Turkish origin". Little is known about his early life, but it is thought he spoke at least three languages: Greek, Turkish and English.

By 1651 Rosée was living in Smyrna (modern İzmir, Turkey), in the Ottoman Empire, where he became the servant of Daniel Edwards, an English merchant of the Levant Company. The Levant Company was an English chartered company formed in 1592 with the purpose of regulating English trade with the Ottoman Empire and the Levant. The charter effectively provided a monopoly for fifty-three English merchants named in the text. English traders preferred to employ Levantine servants as they were cheaper than those from England and had better knowledge of the local languages and customs. Rosée's language skills made him an important aid for Edwards in business, and he acted as "a clerk of accounts, a translator and a social diplomat, using his knowledge of Turkish customs to smooth the path of commerce", according to the historian Markman Ellis; he also acted in a personal capacity as Edwards's valet and coachman. Although Edwards's servants prepared and served his food, as his valet, Rosée prepared and served his coffee.

Edwards left Smyrna in late 1651 to return to England, accompanied by Rosée; this was either because Edwards had thwarted activities of a royalist cadre in the Levant Company in 1647 and 1650, or because of an outbreak of plague in the region, which reached Smyrna in September 1651. (Note: With the start of the interregnum in Britain in 1649, the royalists in the British community in Smyrna attempted to take over the Levant trade to gain funds for the royalist cause; conspiracies by Sir Sackvile Crowe in 1646–1647 and Sir Henry Hyde in 1650 were both attempted and thwarted by the parliamentarian-supporting members of the British community.) According to Markman Ellis, "Edwards brought some characteristics of Levantine merchants: hard work, Puritan politics and coffee drinking". According to one of Edwards's friends, it was known he "drank two or three dishes [of coffee] at a time, twice or thrice a day". Friends would visit Edwards frequently to share his coffee and socialise; so many visited to taste this novel drink that it affected his family life, and in 1652 he decided to set up a coffee-house. As the rules of the Levant company meant he was unable to open it himself, he set up Rosée in business. (Note: The company's rules were that its members had to be "mere merchants" who were only to be involved in wholesale trading, rather than in other enterprises.)

=== Coffee shop ===
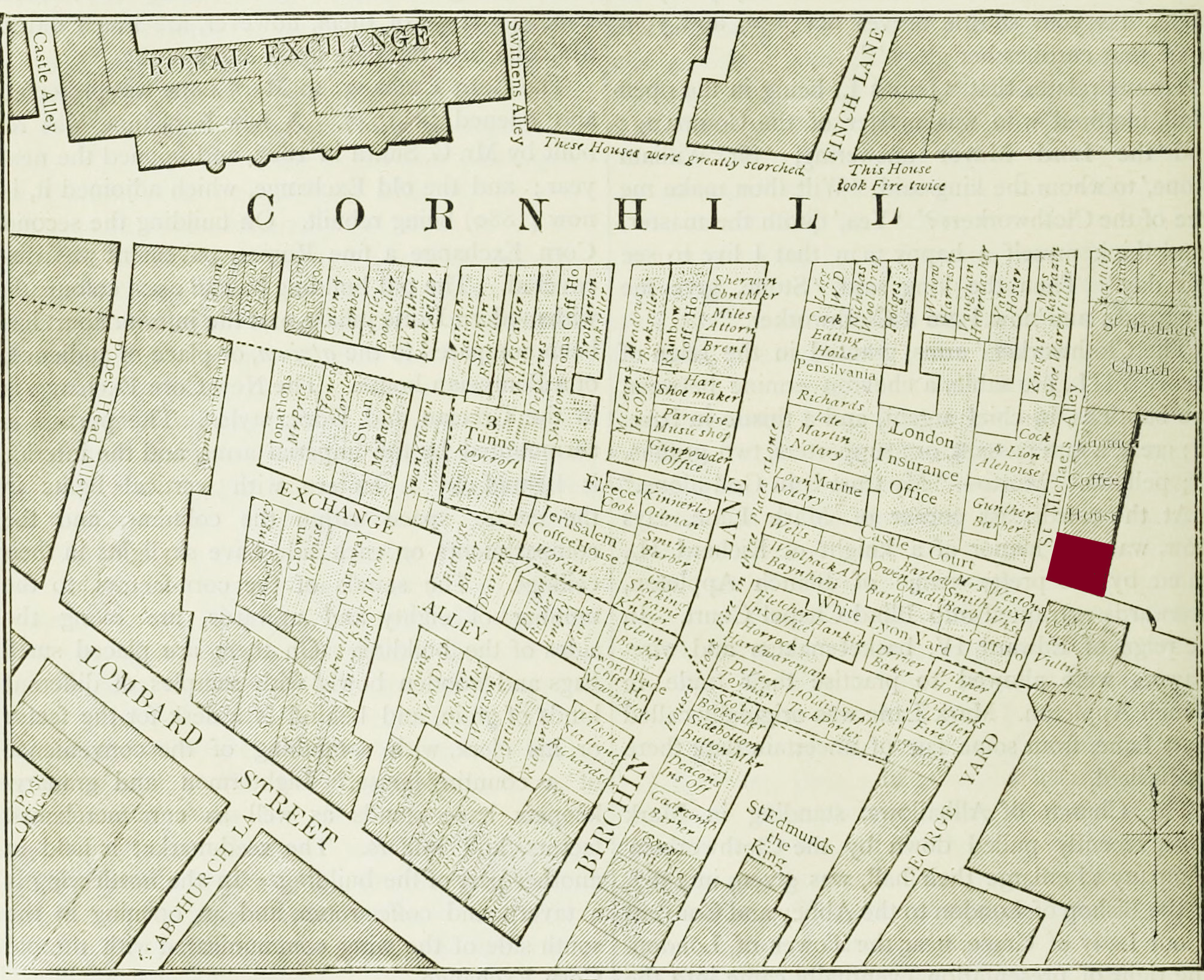
Plan of London in 1748 showing the position of Rosée's coffee shop, in red, in St Michael's Alley

Edwards and Rosée selected premises in St Michael's Alley, just off Cornhill and near the Royal Exchange. The lanes and alleys around the Exchange—a favoured place for merchants to meet daily—were busy with traders, lawyers, tavern keepers and the general public. The first incarnation of their coffee-house was a shed resembling a market stall on the edge of the churchyard of St Michael's Church. A sign hung over Rosée's stall, described either as "an image of himself dressed in some Levantine clothing", or a sign portraying his head.

To promote his enterprise, in 1652 Rosée published a handbill advertising "The Vertue of the Coffee Drink" in which he extolled the benefits of coffee, claiming "It is excellent to prevent and cure the dropsy, gout and scurvy", as well as scrofula, miscarriages and "a most excellent remedy against the spleen, hypocondriack winds and the like". This is the earliest-known advertisement for coffee, according to the historian Aytoun Ellis. The launch of the new product onto the London market was aided by the politics of the day, with puritans attacking the sale of wine and beer as being connected to the profligate and licentious activities of the Royalists. Taverners and wine merchants bemoaned the falling sales of their products in 1651 and 1652, and Rosée's positioning of coffee as a healthy and sober drink helped the product become commercially successful. One contemporary estimated that Rosée's turnover was 30 or 40 shillings a day – approximately £450 to 600 a year. (Note: £450 in 1652 equates to approximately £81,000 in 2025; £600 in the same year equates to approximately £108,000 in 2025, according to calculations based on the Consumer Price Index measure of inflation.)

Markman Ellis considers the estimate is "probably overstated", although Rosée's business was successful enough to generate jealousy from local tavern owners; they petitioned the Lord Mayor of London on the basis that Rosée was not a freeman of the City of London, and therefore should not be able to trade as he did. To overcome the barrier to Rosée's continuing trading, Edwards turned to his father-in-law, Alderman Thomas Hodges, who proposed one of his former apprentices, Christopher "Kitt" Bowman, a freeman of the City of London, to join Rosée as a partner, which took place in 1654.

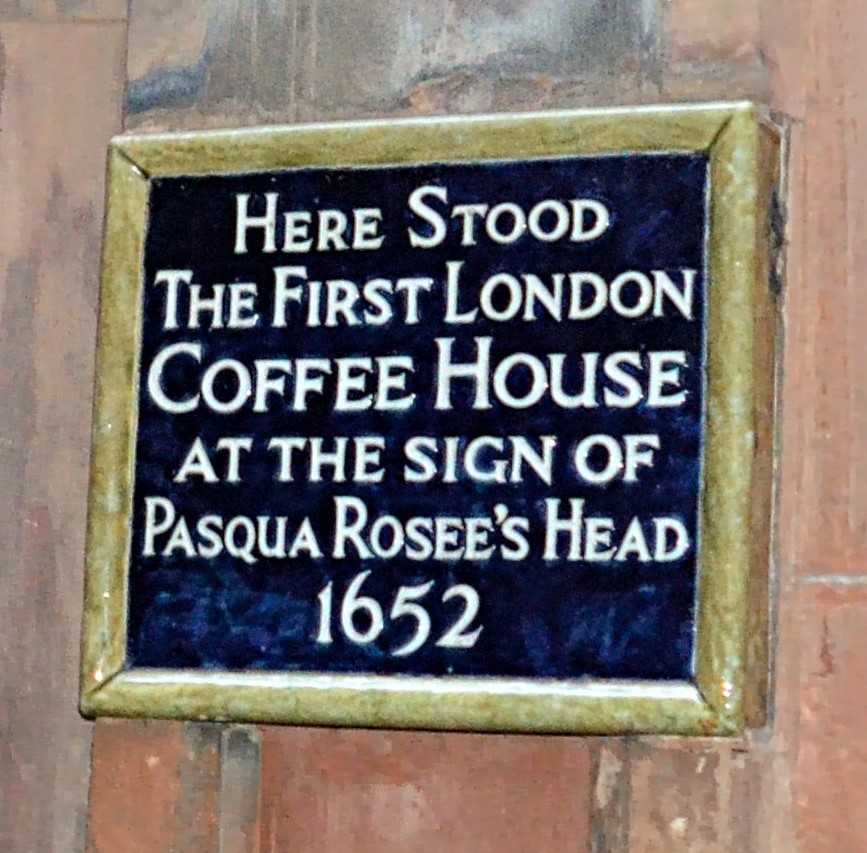
Plaque affixed to the Jamaica Wine House, which now stands on the original location in St Michael's Alley

In 1656 Rosée and Bowman moved from their shed into premises, also in St Michael's Alley, which measured 27.5 by 19 feet (8.4 by 5.8 m); the property was in poor condition, needing repairs and the men paid an annual rent of £4. (Note: £4 in 1656 equates to approximately £1,000 in 2025, according to calculations based on the Consumer Price Index measure of inflation.) The two men operated in partnership until at least 1658 (when they were both listed in the churchwardens' accounts), but Rosée seems to have no part in the joint venture after that. The two men also ran competing coffee-houses on opposite sides of the street, which was remembered in doggerel verse, published under the name Adrianus del Tasso:

Pull courage, Pasqua, fear no Harms,
From the besieging Foe;
Make good your ground, stand to your Arms,
Hold out this summer, and then tho'
He'll storm, he'll not prevail—your Face
Shall give the Coffee Pot the chace.

There are no records relating to Rosée after 1658. The apothecary and writer John Houghton, writing in 1699, said that Rosée disappeared from London "for some misdemeanour", although no record or evidence for the misdemeanour has been found. There were claims that he left England and sold coffee in Germany or Holland—the latter in 1664—but there is no evidence to support either claim.

== Legacy ==
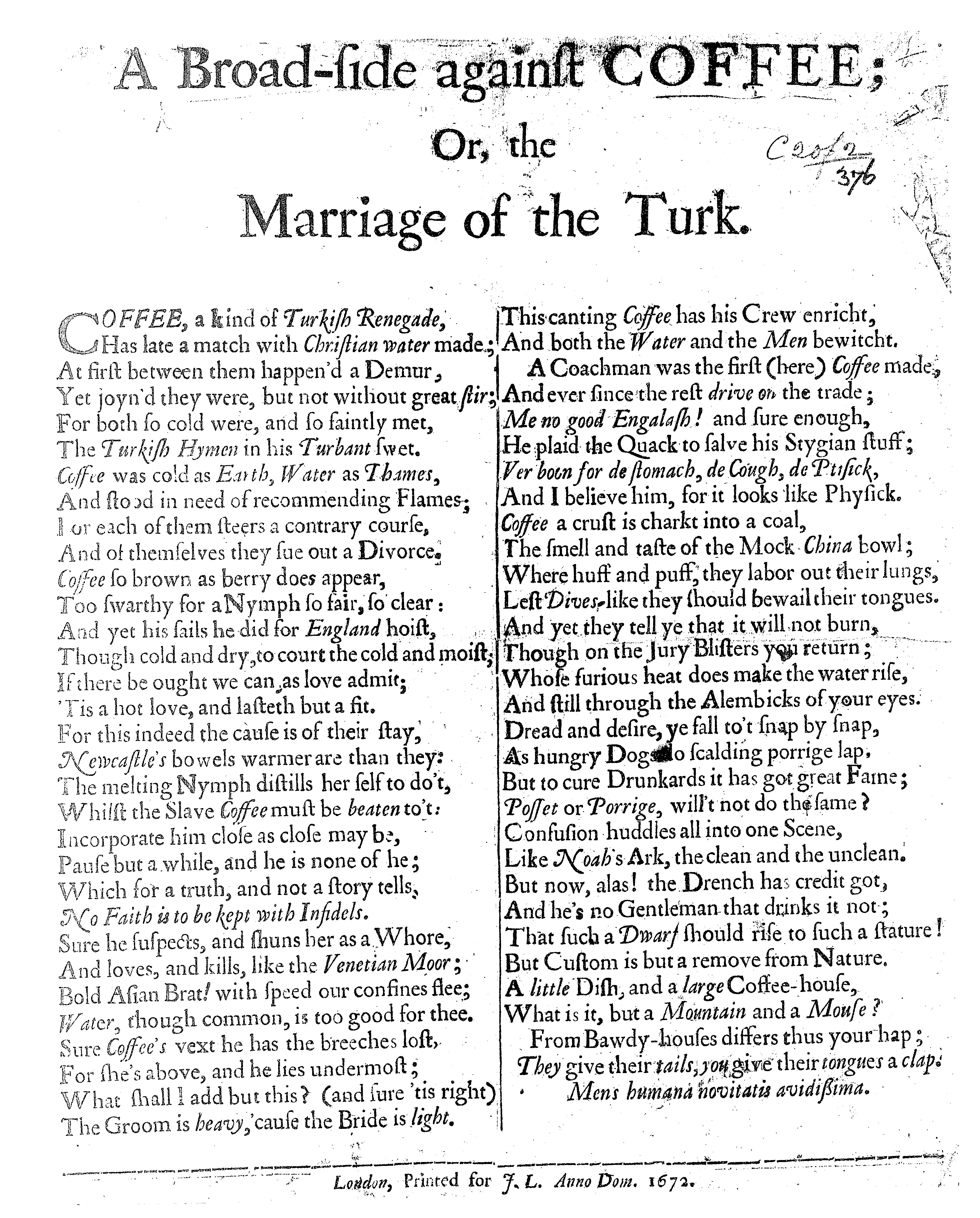
"A Broad-Side Against Coffee": an anonymous attack on coffee and Rosée from 1672

Bowman continued to run the coffee-house until 1662, when he died of tuberculosis. His widow continued to run the coffee-house until at least May 1663, when hers was one of seven coffee-houses in the Cornhill ward. The original closely built wooden buildings in St Michael's Alley were destroyed in the 1666 Great Fire of London, although the stone-built church survived.

Rosée's was only the first of many coffee-houses in London. In 1659 a Covent Garden barber wrote that there was seemingly coffee sold "in almost every street" and by 1663 there were 83 coffee-houses in London, the clients of which were largely connected to trade in the Levant or Baltic region. Increasingly they became, as Markman Ellis writes, "firmly associated with the tumultuous political culture of the Commonwealth". In the early years of the growth of coffee-houses, there was opposition from local tavern keepers, who complained to the Lord Mayor of London about the number of non-Freemen of the city involved in the trade, and in December 1675, after the restoration of the monarchy, Charles II issued "A proclamation for the Suppression of Coffee-Houses", which withdrew all licences to sell coffee; the resulting uproar led to the proclamation being withdrawn. No precise figures exist, but by 1708 coffee-houses were found in several provincial cities, with 500–600 in London and Westminster, and in 1739, the London Directories listed 551.

Coffee-houses soon grew to be an important aspect of stock trading. In 1698 one trader began publishing share prices from Jonathan's Coffee-House and then from Garraway's Coffee House; according to the historian Elizabeth Hennessy, this publication is "among the earliest evidence of the existence of organised trading in marketable securities in London". Lloyd's Coffee House in Tower Street was opened in the 1680s by Edward Lloyd; he began publishing news sheets relating to shipping movements, and a newspaper, Lloyd's News. He would also rent out tables to those who insured ships, and traders, merchants and shipowners congregated at the coffee-house to do business; this was the origin of the Lloyd's of London shipping market.

Rosée's sign was copied and imitated by several other coffee-houses and taverns across Britain. In his 1963 study of London coffee-houses from 1652 to 1900, the historian Bryant Lillywhite identified over fifty outlets using a sign comprising a Turk's head. (Note: It is possible that Rosée was not the only inspiration for the use of a Turk's head; the outline of Suleiman the Magnificent, the tenth and longest-reigning Sultan of the Ottoman Empire, who ruled between 1520 and 1566, is also a possible influence, according to Lillywhite.) After he left the coffee-house, Rosée's reputation remained in the popular memory. He was the inspiration for a character in Knavery in all Trades, a play written by John Tatham in 1664, and he was the target of the anonymously written satire "A Broad-Side Against Coffee". A pub, the Jamaica Wine House, built in the nineteenth century, now occupies the location of Rosée's outlet in St Michael's Alley. In 1952 the Lord Mayor of London, Sir Leslie Boyce, unveiled a plaque on the location, in celebration of the tercentenary of the founding of Rosée's shop.

== First coffee-house ==
Markman Ellis writes that several sources state that Rosée's coffee-house was the first in London but the second in England, after an earlier coffee-house that may have existed in Oxford; he considers this erroneous and that Rosée's "was the first in Christendom". The source of information about the Oxford coffee-house, Ellis states, is from the Oxford antiquarian Anthony Wood who wrote in his diary, known as "Secretum Antonii", that "Jacob a Jew opened a coffey house at the Angel in the parish of S. Peter, in the East Oxon". Wood left the reference undated, but the editor of his work, Andrew Clark, dated it to March 1650 or 1651. Wood's diaries state that coffee was consumed in private in 1650 in Oxford and that it was "publickly solde at or neare the Angel within the East Gate of Oxon ... by an outlander or a Jew" at some point between August 1654 and April 1655.

== Notes and references ==
=== Sources ===
==== Books ====
- Brandon, David (2010). London Pubs. Stroud: Amberley Publishing. ISBN 978-1-4456-2927-8.
- Cowan, Brian William (2005). The Social Life of Coffee: The Emergence of the British Coffeehouse. New Haven, CT: Yale University Press. ISBN 978-0-300-10666-4.
- Ellis, Aytoun (1956). The Penny Universities. A History of the Coffee-Houses. London: Secker & Warburg. OCLC 560091808.
- Ellis, Markman (2004a). The Coffee-House: A Cultural History. London: Weidenfeld & Nicolson. ISBN 978-0-2978-4319-1.
- Grafe, Christoph (2007). "The Architecture of Cafés, Coffee Houses and Public Bars". In Grafe, Christoph; Bollerey, Franziska (eds.). Cafés and Bars: The Architecture of Public Display. Abingdon, Oxon: Routledge. pp. 4–46. ISBN 978-1-1342-2817-1.
- Hennessy, Elizabeth (2001). Coffee House to Cyber Market: 200 Years of the London Stock Exchange. London: Ebury Press. ISBN 978-0-09-187096-6.
- Houghton, John (September 1699). "A Discourse of Coffee". Philosophical Transactions of the Royal Society of London. 21 (256): 311–317. doi:10.1098/rstl.1699.0056. S2CID 186209420.
- Inglis, Lucy (2014). Georgian London: Into the Streets. London: Penguin. ISBN 978-0-6709-2015-0.
- Lillywhite, Bryant (1963). London Coffee Houses: A Reference Book of Coffee Houses of the Seventeenth, Eighteenth and Nineteenth Centuries. London: G. Allen and Unwin. OCLC 491528636.
- Pendergrast, Mark (2019). Uncommon Grounds: The History of Coffee and How It Transformed Our World. New York: Basic Books. ISBN 978-1-5416-9938-0.
- Robinson, Edward Forbes (1893). The Early History of Coffee Houses in England; with Some Account of the First Use of Coffee and a Bibliography of the Subject. London: Kegan Paul, Trench, Trübner. OCLC 473270265.
- Rosée, Pasqua (1652). The Vertue of the COFFEE Drink. OCLC 1203207471.
- Weinberg, Bennett Alan (2001). The World of Caffeine: The Science and Culture of the World's Most Popular Drug. New York: Routledge. ISBN 978-0-4159-2722-2.
- Wild, Antony (2004). Coffee: A Dark History. London: Fourth Estate. ISBN 978-1-84115-649-1.
- Wood, Alfred C. (1964) [1935]. A History of the Levant Company. London: Frank Cass and Co. OCLC 433802203.

==== Journals and magazines ====
- Cowan, Brian (2017). "Rosee, Pasqua". Oxford Dictionary of National Biography (online ed.). Oxford University Press. doi:10.1093/ref:odnb/92862. (Subscription, Wikipedia Library access or UK public library membership required.)
- Ellis, Markman (May 2004b). "Pasqua Rosée's Coffee-House, 1652–1666". The London Journal. 29 (1): 1–24. doi:10.1179/ldn.2004.29.1.1. S2CID 159770229.
- Ellis, Markman (April 2008). "An Introduction to the Coffee-House: A Discursive Model". Language & Communication. 28 (2): 156–164. doi:10.1016/j.langcom.2008.01.004.
- Palmer, Sarah (2007). "Lloyd, Edward (c. 1648–1713)". Oxford Dictionary of National Biography (online ed.). Oxford University Press. doi:10.1093/ref:odnb/16829. (Subscription, Wikipedia Library access or UK public library membership required.)

==== News sources ====
- "London's First Coffee House". The Times. 26 March 1952. p. 6.

==== Websites ====
- Clark, Gregory (2020). "The Annual RPI and Average Earnings for Britain, 1209 to Present (New Series)". MeasuringWorth.
- "Coffee and commerce 1652–1811". Lloyd's of London. Archived from the original on 2 February 2023.
- "Jamaica Wine House (Jamaica Buildings), Non Civil Parish – 1079156". Historic England.
