= English coffeehouses in the 17th and 18th centuries =

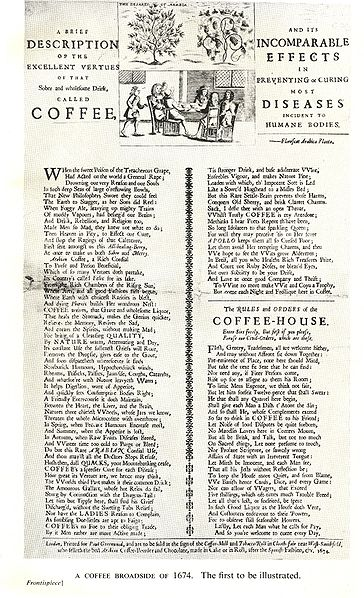
"The rules and orders of the coffee-house", A Brief Description of the Excellent Vertues of that sober and wholesome drink, called coffee (1674)

In 17th- and 18th-century England, coffeehouses served as public social places where men would meet for conversation and commerce. A penny bought admission and a cup of coffee. During the mid-17th century, travellers introduced coffee as a beverage; previously it had been consumed mainly for its supposed medicinal properties. Coffeehouses also served tea and hot chocolate as well as light meals.

The historian Brian Cowan describes English coffeehouses as "places where people gathered to drink coffee, learn the news of the day, and perhaps to meet with other local residents and discuss matters of mutual concern". The absence of alcohol created an atmosphere allowing more serious conversation than in an alehouse. Coffeehouses also played an important role in the development of financial markets and newspapers.

Topics discussed included politics and political scandals, daily gossip, fashion, current events, and debates surrounding philosophy and the natural sciences; political groups frequently used coffeehouses as meeting places. Historians of the 17th and 18th centuries often associate English coffeehouses with the intellectual and cultural history of the Age of Enlightenment; they were an alternate sphere, supplementary to the university.

== Origins ==
=== Early European knowledge of coffee ===
Europeans first learned about coffee consumption through exotic accounts of travels in the empires of Asia. According to Aytoun Ellis, travellers recounted how men would consume an intoxicating liquor, "black in colour and made by infusing the powdered berry of a plant that flourished in Arabia". Native men consumed this liquid "all day long and far into the night, with no apparent desire for sleep but with mind and body continuously alert, men talked and argued, finding in the hot black liquor a curious stimulus quite unlike that produced by fermented juice of grape".

Brian Cowan describes how initial European perceptions of the oriental consumption of coffee were gradually transformed, and how the English "virtuoso (Note: "The English gentlemen who chose to identify themselves with the Italian word virtuoso were seeking to associate themselves with an international world of elite cultural interests strongly rooted in knowledge about classical antiquity and Italianate Renaissance learning. This interest in the classical past quickly expanded to encompass many more objects of inquiry. More than anything, these English virtuosi shared a distinct sensibility, a set of attitudes, habits, and intellectual preferences that they labeled 'curiosity'. The virtuosi held an almost limitless curiosity about the wider worlds around them.") fascination with the exotic" was perhaps motivated by a "utilitarian project for the advancement of learning and the national interest".

Experiments with coffee led to supposed cures for ailments such as "head-melancholy", gout, scurvy, smallpox and excessive drunkenness. But some were cautious of the properties of coffee, fearing that it had more unfavourable than positive effects, and that excessive consumption could result in languor, paralysis, heart conditions and trembling limbs, as well as low-spiritedness and nervous disorders.

=== Early Oxford coffeehouses ===
In regard of easie expence, being to wait for or meet a Friend, ... here for a penny or two you may spend 2 or 3 hours, have the shelter of a House, the warmth of a Fire, the diversion of Company and conveniency if you please of taking a Pipe of Tobacco, And all this without any grumbling or repining.

— "Coffee-houses vindicated..." (anonymous, 1673)

During the mid-17th century, coffee was no longer viewed solely as a medicinal plant; and this change in perception created a novel opportunity for serving coffee to patrons. A ripe location for this was Oxford, with its unique combination of exotic scholarship interests and energetic experimental community. Thus the first English coffeehouse was established in 1650 at the Angel coaching inn in Oxford by a Jewish entrepreneur named Jacob.

Oxford was important for the creation of a distinctive coffeehouse culture throughout the 1650s. The first coffeehouses established there offered an alternative to structural academic learning, while still being frequented by the English virtuosi, who pursued advances in human knowledge. The coffeehouses would charge a penny for admission, which would include access to newspapers and conversation. Reporters called "runners" went around to the coffeehouses announcing the latest news.

This environment attracted an eclectic group of people who met and mingled. In a society that placed a high importance on class and economic status, the coffeehouses were unique because the patrons were from all levels of society. Anyone who had a penny could come inside. Students from the universities also frequented the coffeehouses – in Anthony Wood's opinion, squandering time better spent on their studies.

Brian Cowan states: "The coffeehouse was a place for like-minded scholars to congregate, to read, as well as to learn from and to debate with each other, but was emphatically not a university institution, and the discourse there was of a far different order than any university tutorial."

Contemporary evaluations varied. A contrasting pair are:

- "So great a Universitie / I think there ne're was any; / In which you may a Schoolar be / For spending of a Penny." (1672)
- "A School it is without a Master. Education is here taught without Discipline. Learning (if it be possible) is here insinuated without Method." (1661) (Note: This continues: "Good Manners and commendable Humors are here infused into Men by the contemplation of the Deformity of their contrarie's, as the Spartars infused into their Children hatred of Drunkenness by setting before them their drunken Helots.")

As described in the memoirs of Anthony Wood and John Evelyn, the earliest coffeehouses had an air of exclusivity, catering to the virtuosi. Early Oxford coffeehouse virtuosi included Christopher Wren, Peter Pett, Thomas Millington, Timothy Baldwin, and John Lamphire.

These Oxford coffeehouses helped set the tone for future coffeehouses in England, differing from alehouses and taverns. "The coffeehouse was a place for 'virtuosi' and 'wits', rather than for the plebes or roués who were commonly portrayed as typical patrons of the alcoholic drinking houses." Ellis concludes, "[Oxford's coffeehouses'] power lay in the fact that they were in daily touch with the people. Their purpose was something more than to provide a meeting-place for social intercourse and gossip; there was serious and sober discussion on all matters of common interest."

Although most works on the early English coffeehouses say that Jacob's in Oxford was the first, this claim has been questioned. Markman Ellis writes that Anthony Wood originally wrote that coffee was first drunk in Oxford in 1650, and at some time in 1654 or 1655 that coffee was "publickly solde at or neare the Angel within the East Gate of Oxon ... by an outlander or a Jew". In his revision of 1671 Wood altered this to "Jacob a Jew opened a coffey house at the Angel in the parish of S. Peter, in the East Oxon", a claim, Ellis says, "conjecturally dated by Wood's editor Andrew Clark at 'March 1651' but there is no evidence to support this earlier date...."

=== Early London coffeehouses ===
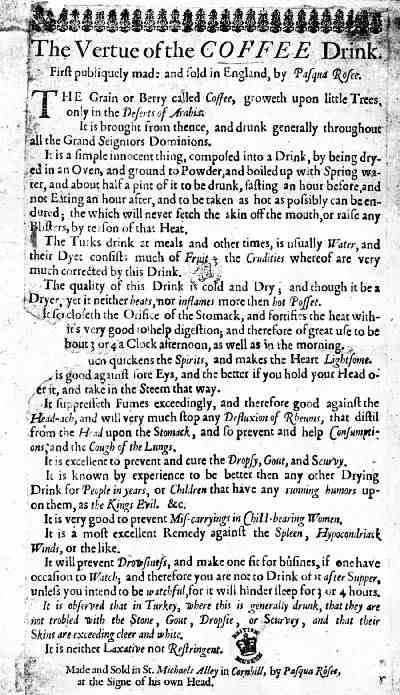
The Vertue of the "COFFEE" Drink, a handbill from 1652, advertising coffee "First publiquely made and sold in England, by Pasqua Rosee"

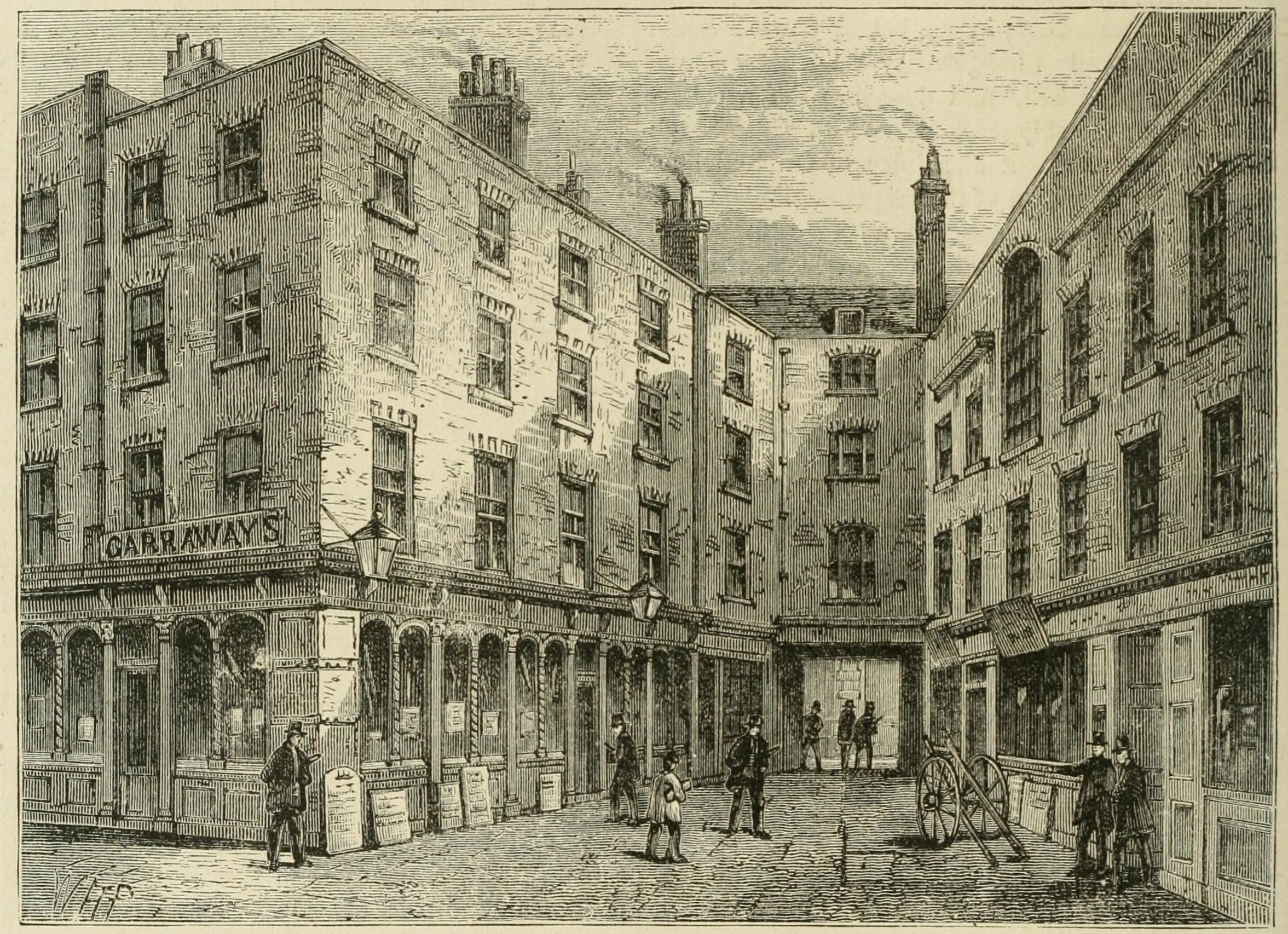
Garraway's Coffee House in Exchange Alley, London

The Oxford-style coffeehouses, which acted as centres for social intercourse, gossip, and scholastic interest, spread quickly to London, where coffeehouses became part of popular and political culture. Pasqua Rosée, a native of Smyrna (western Turkey) who was a servant of a Levant Company merchant named Daniel Edwards, established the first London coffeehouse in 1652. London's second coffeehouse was established by James Farr in 1657 at Temple Bar and named the Rainbow.

The London coffeehouses do not seem to have been popular until the mid-1660s or later. When James Harrington's Rota club began to meet in a London coffeehouse known as the Turk's Head, to debate "matters of politics and philosophy", coffeehouse popularity began to rise. This club had as its raison d'être the art of debate, "contentious but still civil, learned but not didactic". However:

it was not entirely the "free and open academy unto all comers" that the club's own rhetoric proclaimed it to be. There was an admission fee: Samuel Pepys paid the not inconsiderable sum of 18 [pence] to become a member of the club; and just as important were the informal means of exclusion which obtained....

Despite Rota's banishment after the Restoration of the monarchy, its members' "discursive ideal" set the tone for coffeehouse conversation throughout the rest of the 17th century. By the early 18th century, London boasted more coffeehouses than any other city in the western world, except for Constantinople.

== Popular period ==
=== Character ===
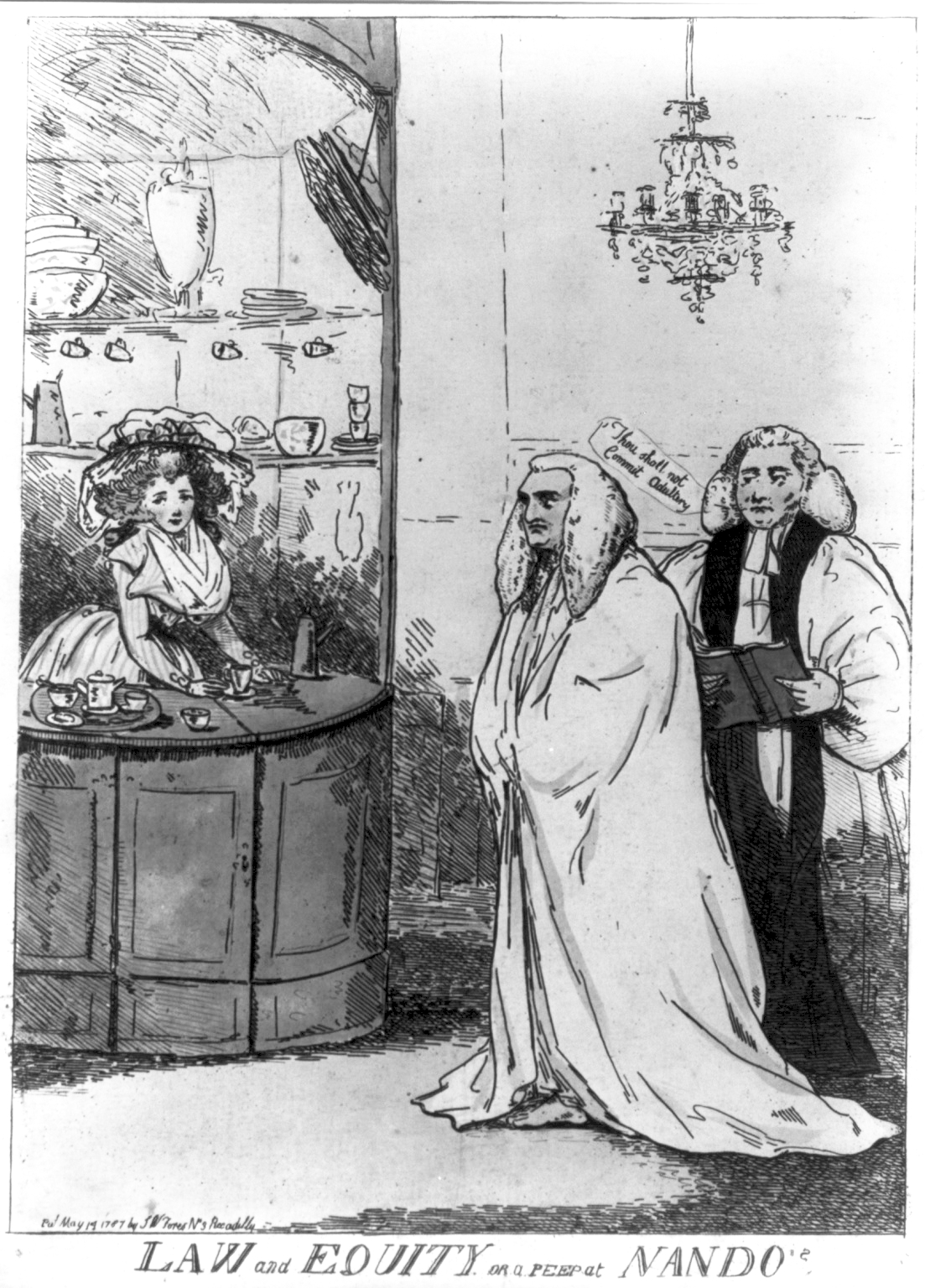
A 1787 cartoon depicting lawyer Edward Thurlow at Nando's Coffee House

During the third quarter of the 17th century, each coffeehouse tended to have its own character, and writers of contemporaneous descriptions of each "seem anxious to impart to a curious and much wider public a knowledge of the town's latest noveltie and something of its unique attraction". A relaxed atmosphere, their relative cheapness and the frequency with which they could be visited contributed to sociability and their rise in demand.

Neither London's plague of 1665 nor its fire of 1666 caused their popularity to wane. Ellis explains:

Londoners could not be entirely subdued and there were still some who climbed the narrow stairs to their favourite coffeehouses although no longer prepared to converse freely with strangers. Before entering they looked quite around the room, and would not approach even close acquaintances without first inquiring the health of the family at home and receiving assurances of their well-being.

English coffeehouses acted as public houses in which all who paid the price of a penny were welcome. Ellis describes the variety of men present in a typical coffeehouse in the post-Restoration period: "Like Noah's ark, every kind of creature in every walk of life [frequented coffeehouses]. They included a town wit, a grave citizen, a worthy lawyer, a worship justice, a reverend nonconformist, and a voluble sailor." Some historians claim that coffeehouses acted as democratic bodies due to their inclusive nature: "Whether a man was dressed in a ragged coat and found himself seated between a belted earl and a gaitered bishop it made no difference; moreover he was able to engage them in conversation and know that he would be answered civilly."

Coffeehouse conversation was supposed to conform to a particular manner. The language of polite and civil conversation was considered essential to coffeehouse debate and conversation. There is dispute among historians as to the main role that civility played. Lawrence E. Klein argues that the portrayal to the public of utmost civility was imperative for the survival of coffeehouse popularity throughout the period of Restoration-era anxieties.

Brian Cowan applies the term "civility" to coffeehouses in the sense of "a peculiarly urban brand of social interaction which valued sober and reasoned debate on matters of great import, be they scientific, aesthetic, or political". He argues that although "very few formal means of exclusion operated to keep undesirables out", "there were a whole host of informal means". These included conventions outlined by clubs, such as Harrington's Rota club, when frequenting coffeehouses. Cowan maintains that these "rules" had a great impact on coffeehouse sociability.

Erin Mackie argues that Addison and Steele's popular periodicals, The Tatler and The Spectator, infused politeness into English coffeehouse conversation, as "[The Tatler] stated as its explicit purpose the reformation of English manners and morals". Aytoun Ellis explains that because Puritanism influenced English coffeehouse behavior, intoxicants were forbidden, allowing for respectable, sober conversation. He offers an example of one coffeehouse patron who, upon seeking ale within a coffeehouse, was asked to leave and visit a nearby tavern.

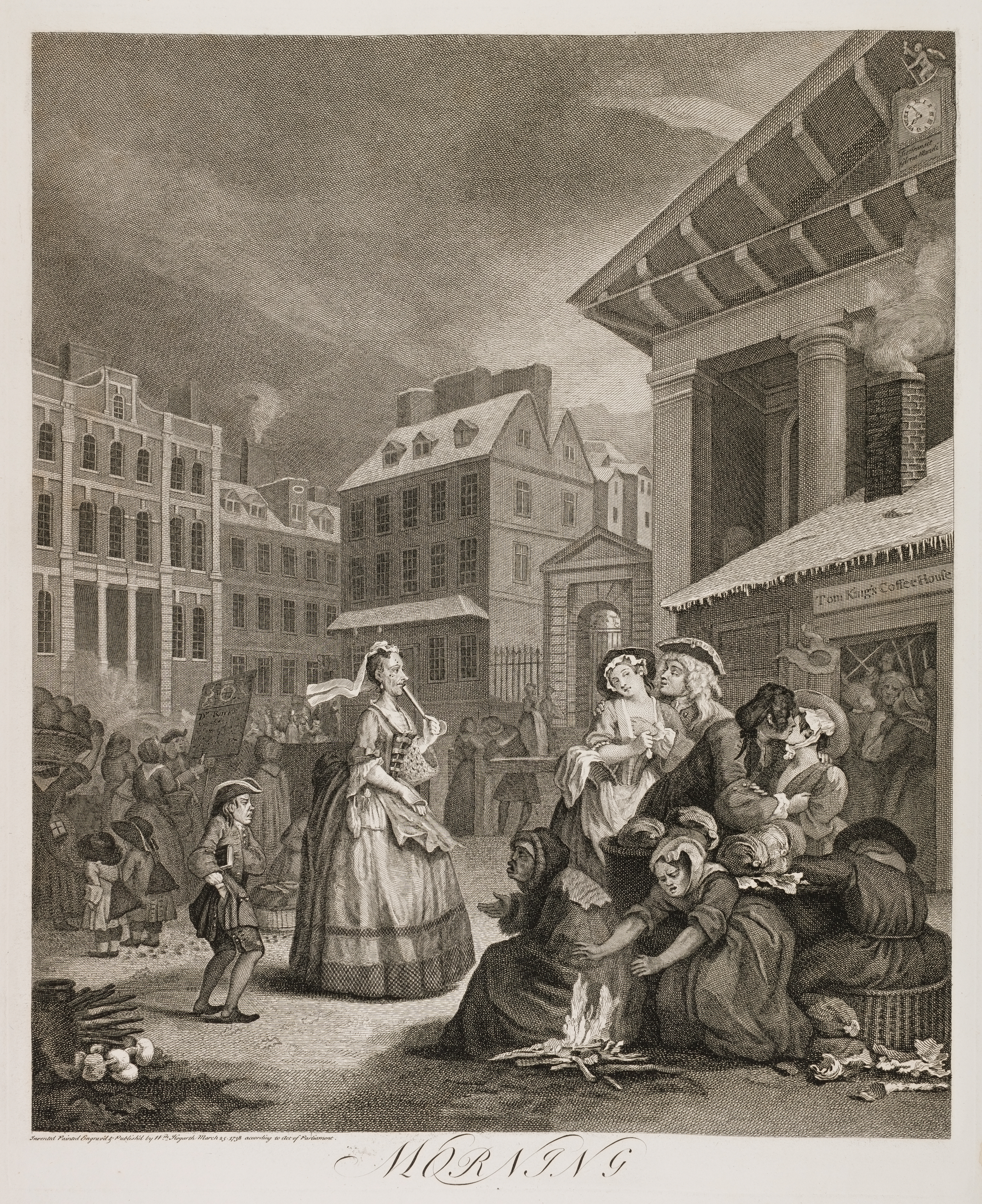
Hogarth's depiction of a fight breaking out in Moll King's Coffee House, at the far right of the engraving of his 1736 painting Morning (Note: Helen Berry writes: "Moll's coffee house is in the foreground of the painting, and is indeed little more than a shack, dwarfed by St Paul's Church to the rear. In Hogarth's scene, it is early morning, and Covent Garden is covered in snow, but, bleary-eyed and dishevelled, a couple of rakes have just emerged from the coffee house and are busy fondling prostitutes, oblivious to the market sellers and churchgoers who pass by. Meanwhile, inside the coffee house, a woman (most likely Moll herself) attempts to restrain a rowdy crew who have drawn their swords. Someone's wig is knocked off in the fight, and Hogarth captures the moment just as it flies through the air and out of the doorway.")

Various coffeehouses catered to diverse groups of individuals who focused on specific topics of discussion. The variety of topics and groups to which the coffeehouses catered illustrates the heterogeneity of English society during the period. After the Restoration, coffeehouses continued to cater to a range of gentlemanly arts and acted as alternative centres of academic learning, with lessons in French, Italian or Latin, dancing, fencing, poetry, mathematics and astronomy.

Other coffeehouses acted as centres for gatherings of less learned men. Helen Berry describes one coffeehouse, known as Moll King's Coffee House, as frequented by lowlifes and drunkards as well as "an unusually wide social mix of male customers, from courtiers to Covent Garden market traders and pimps". It was also associated with prostitution, a business that King kept "at one remove". Customers habitually engaged in a type of conversation known as "flash", a derivative of cant. Other groups frequented other coffeehouses for various reasons. For example, Child's coffeehouse, "near the Physician's Warwick Lane and St. Paul's church yard", was frequented by the clergy and by doctors.

=== 'Rules' ===
According to "The Rules and Orders of the Coffee-House" – in verse, and appearing on a broadside printed in 1674 – "Gentry, Tradesmen, all are welcome hither, And may without Affront sit down Together", and "Nor need any, if Finer Persons come, Rise up for to assigne to them his Room". But if he swore, he would have to forfeit twelve pence. If a quarrel broke out, the instigator would have to buy each of the offended a "dish" of coffee. The topic of "sacred things" was to be limited in coffeehouses, and one was not to speak poorly of the state. The rules also forbade games of chance such as cards and dice, as well as bets of over five shillings.

However, "In reality, there were no regulations or rules governing the coffee-houses. [The Rules and Orders'] satire ironises the very idea of regulating their behaviour."

=== Financial markets ===
Frequent consumption of ale and beer was common in England until the time when water safe to drink became available. (Note: A. Lynn Martin points to Benjamin Franklin's account of working in a London printing house in the 1720s: "We had an Alehouse Boy who attended always in the House to supply the Workmen. My Companion at the Press drank every day a Pint before Breakfast; a Pint at Breakfast with his Bread and Cheese; a Pint between Breakfast and Dinner; a Pint at Dinner; a Pint in the Afternoon about Six o'clock, and another when he had done his Day's Work.") The historian Matthew Green claims that: "until the mid-seventeenth century, most people in England were either slightly – or very – drunk all of the time", and that:

The arrival of coffee ... triggered a dawn of sobriety that laid the foundations for truly spectacular economic growth in the decades that followed as people thought clearly for the first time. The stock exchange, insurance industry, and auctioneering: all burst into life in 17th-century coffeehouses – in Jonathan's, Lloyd's, and Garraway's – spawning the credit, security, and markets that facilitated the dramatic expansion of Britain's network of global trade in Asia, Africa and America.

Stockbrokers gathered and traded in coffee houses, notably Jonathan's and Garraway's, because they were not allowed in the Royal Exchange due to their rude manners.

Lloyd's Coffee House, frequented by merchants and sailors, "developed a unique range of financial publications (a single-page list of shipping movements from 1692 and a marine newspaper, Lloyds News, for five months in 1696–7), which made the coffee-house the centre of the London shipping world". As a result, it became the major insurer Lloyd's of London.

=== Print news culture ===
The English coffeehouse also acted as a primary centre of communication for news. Historians strongly associate English coffeehouses with print and scribal publications, as they were important venues for the reading and distribution of such materials, as well as the gathering of important new information. Most coffeehouses provided pamphlets and newspapers, as the price of admission covered their costs. Patrons perused reading material at their leisure. News became available in a variety of forms throughout coffeehouses: "in print, both licensed and unlicensed; in manuscripts; aloud, as gossip, hearsay, and word of mouth". Runners also went round to different coffeehouses, reporting the latest current events. Circulation of bulletins announcing sales, sailings, and auctions was also common in English coffeehouses.

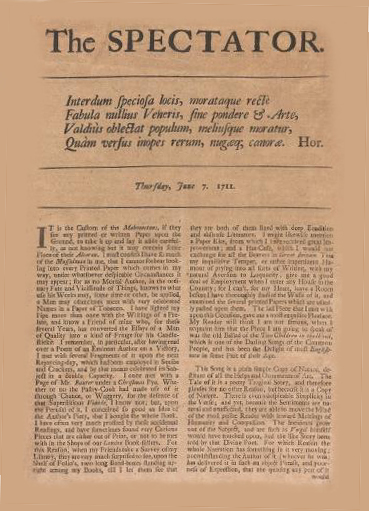
Addison and Steele's The Spectator

Richard Steele and Joseph Addison's publications, the Spectator and the Tatler, were considered the most influential suppliers of print news and the most widely distributed sources of news and gossip within coffeehouses throughout the first half of the 18th century. Addison and Steele worked to reform the manners and morals of English society through a critique that was not zealous but congenial; thus "readers [were] persuaded, not coerced, into freely electing these standards of taste and behavior as their own". Addison and Steele relied on coffeehouses for their sources of news and gossip as well as their clientele, and then spread their news back into the coffeehouses. Edward Bramah attributes the good standing of the press during the days in which Addison and Steele distributed The Tatler and The Spectator in English coffeehouses to the popularity of the coffeehouse.

=== The Enlightenment ===
Historians disagree over the extent to which English coffeehouses contributed to the public sphere of the Age of Enlightenment. There is no simple and uniform way to describe this "age"; however, historians generally agree that during it, reason supplanted other forms of authority that had previously governed human action, such as religion, superstition, or customs of arbitrary authority. In his analysis of the Enlightenment, Jürgen Habermas argues that the period saw the creation of a bourgeois public sphere for the discussion and transformation of opinions. This "public realm", according to Habermas, "is a space where men could escape from their roles as subjects, and gain autonomy in the exercise and exchange of their own opinions and ideas". Consequently, there is also no simple and uniform "public sphere", as the "public realm" can encompass different spheres, such as an intellectual or political public sphere of the Age of Enlightenment.

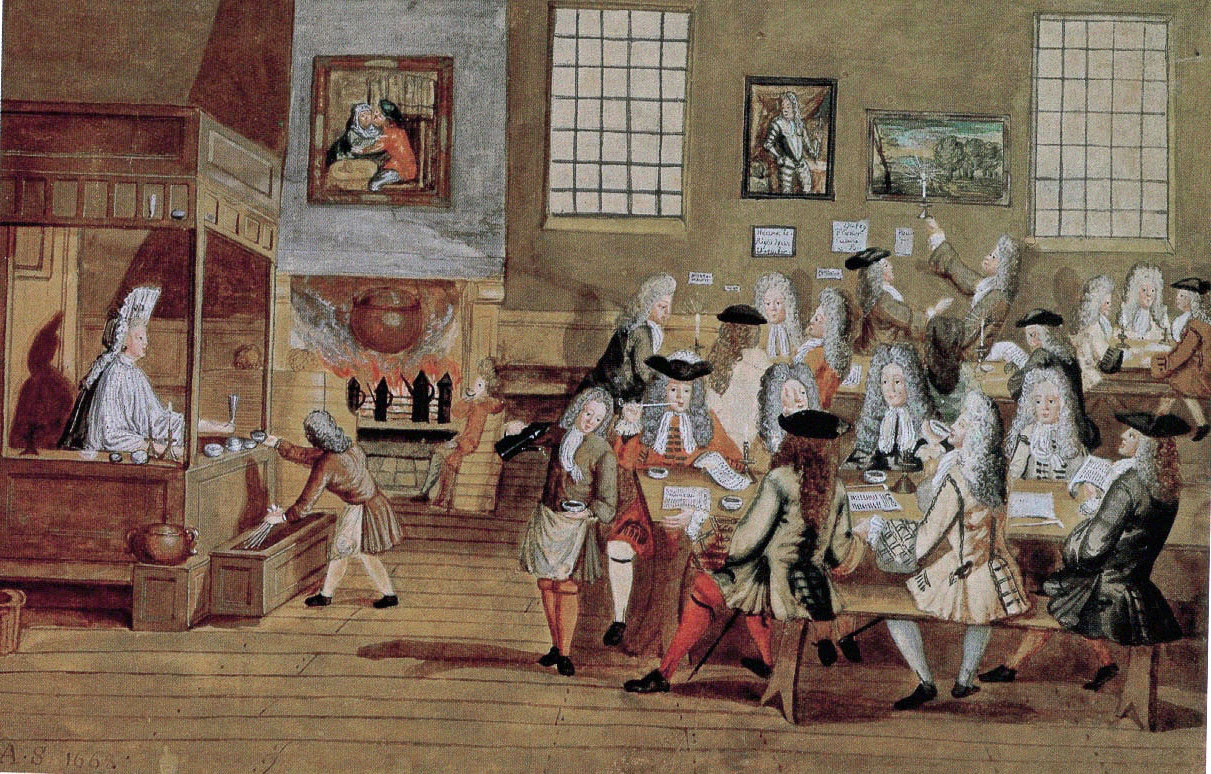
Interior of a London coffeehouse, 17th century

Dorinda Outram places English coffeehouses within an "intellectual public sphere", focusing on the diffusion of enlightened ideas. She justifies this by naming them "commercial operations, open to all who could pay and thus [providing] ways in which many different social strata could be exposed to the same ideas". She also argues that enlightened ideas were diffused through print culture, open to more people after the "reading revolution" at the end of the 18th century. The historian James Van Horn Melton places English coffeehouses within a more political public sphere of the Enlightenment. According to Melton, English coffeehouses were "born in an age of revolution, restoration, and bitter party rivalries. [They] provided public space at a time when political action and debate had begun to spill beyond the institutions that had traditionally contained them." He uses the fact that Harrington's "arch republican" Rota club met within an early London coffeehouse to discuss political issues as evidence that English coffeehouses were depicted as centres of "religious and political dissent". He also shows that different political groups used the popularity of coffeehouses for their own political ends: Puritans encouraged coffeehouse popularity because proprietors forbade the consumption of alcohol there, whereas royalist critics associated coffeehouses with incessant and unwarranted political talk by common subjects.

=== Women ===
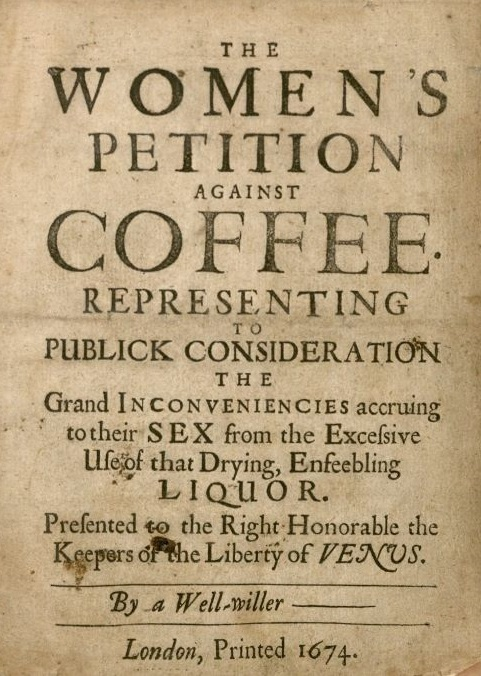
The Women's Petition Against Coffee, 1674

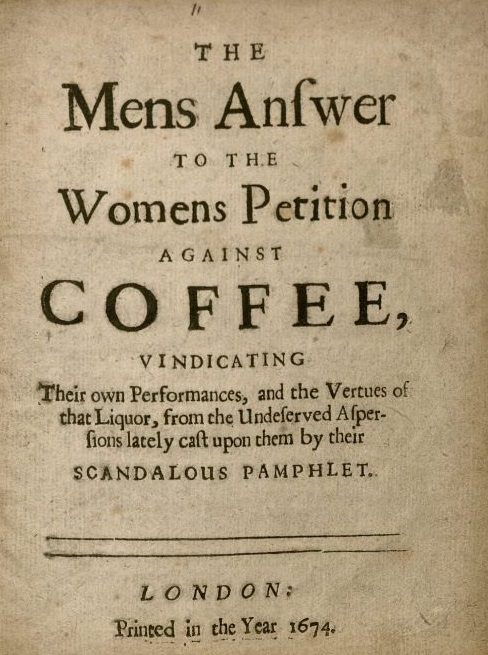
The Mens Answer to the Womens Petition Against Coffee, 1674

Historians disagree on the role and participation of women within the English coffeehouse. Edward Bramah states that women were forbidden from partaking in coffeehouse activity as customers. Brian Cowan, on the other hand, explains that although "[c]offeehouses were theoretically open to [all] regardless of class or merit, and they were the prime sites for the activities upon which a prosperous urban and open society depended to flourish: political discourse, mercantile business, and cultural criticism. Women had little place in this scheme of things." Historians depict coffeehouses as a gentlemanly sphere where men could converse without associating with women; coffeehouses were consequently not considered a place for a lady who wished to preserve her respectability.

Complaints against coffeehouses were commonly voiced by women. Among their arguments against frequenting coffeehouses, as well as coffee consumption, made in The Women's Petition Against Coffee were that coffee made men sterile and impotent and thus contributed to the nation's declining birth rate. According to the Petition, coffee made men "as unfruitful as those Desarts whence that unhappy Berry is said to be brought". Additionally, a husband's alternating visits to coffeehouse and tavern kept him away from home until late, and left his wife ignored and lonely. (Note: "[L]ike Tennis Balls between two Rackets, the Fopps our Husbands are bandied to and fro all day between the Coffee-house and Tavern, whilst we poor Souls sit mopeing all alone till Twelve at night, and when at last they come to bed smoakt like a Westphalia Hogs-head we have no more comfort of them, than from a shotten Herring or a dryed Bulrush; which forces us to take up this Lamentation....")

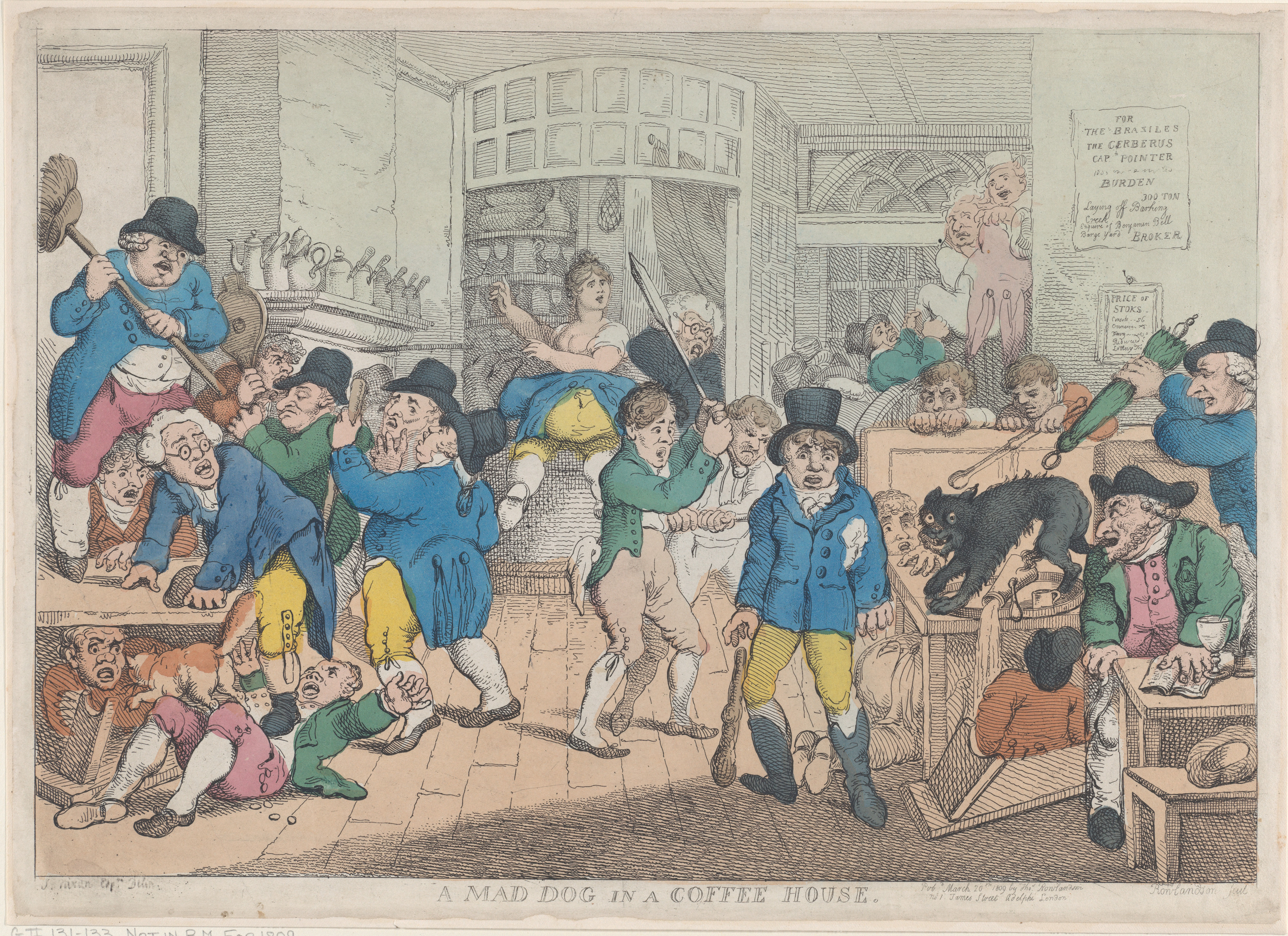
Thomas Rowlandson's etching A Mad Dog in a Coffee House (1809) shows men rushing away from a rabid dog that has somehow entered: the men are caricatured; the attractive woman serving coffee is not, even though a man is attempting to crawl under her dress. This print ridiculed effeminacy during a period when men were greatly concerned not to show feminine characteristics.

Cowan cites a handful of instances in which women were allowed to frequent English coffeehouses: when partaking in business ventures, in Bath, where female sociability was more readily accepted, in gambling/coffeehouses, and while auctions were held within coffeehouses, as a woman acted in the service of her household. Historians have considered female news hawkers who temporarily entered a male-dominated coffeehouse. Paula McDowell has argued that these women "were anything but the passive distributors of other people's political ideas". In addition, as McDowell's study shows, female hawkers "[shaped] the modes and forms of political discourse through their understanding of their customer's desires for news and print ephemera". Nonetheless, McDowell and Cowan agree that although female workers may have been physically within the male public sphere of the coffeehouse, their rank and gender prevented them from fully participating. This was true for other women as well. Cowan points to female proprietors of coffeehouses, "coffee-women", as pertinent examples of women's presence in the public realm of coffeehouses, without necessarily participating. Famous female coffeehouse proprietors are Anne Rochford and Moll King, who subsequently became publicly satirised figures.

== Decline ==
Towards the end of the 18th century, coffeehouses almost completely disappeared from the popular social scene in England. Historians offer a wide range of reasons for their decline. Aytoun Ellis largely attributes it to coffeehouse patrons' folly through business endeavours, the evolution of the club and the government's colonial policy. The coffeehouse proprietors of the cities of London and Westminster worked to gain a monopoly over news publication (akin to that previously enjoyed by Roger L'Estrange), via a coffeehouse newspaper, the Coffee-house Gazette. This, they foresaw, would largely be written by the coffeehouse clients (without payment), the profits going to the proprietors. Ellis comments: "Ridicule and derision killed the coffee-men's proposal but it is significant that, from that date, their influence, status and authority began to wane. In short, coffee-men had made a tactical blunder and had overreached themselves."

The rise of the exclusive gentlemen's club also contributed to the decline in popularity of English coffeehouses. Edward Bramah explains how the rules that had once made coffeehouses accessible meeting places for all fell into disuse: "Snobbery reared its head, particularly amongst the intelligentsia, who felt that their special genius entitled them to protection from the common herd. Strangers were no longer welcome." Some coffeehouses began charging more than the customary penny to preserve frequent attendance by their higher-standing clientele. Literary and political clubs rose in popularity, as "the frivolities of coffee-drinking were lost in more serious discussion".

With increased demand for tea, the government also had a hand in the decline of the English coffeehouse in the 18th century. The East India Company had a greater interest in the tea than the coffee trade, as competition for coffee had heightened with the expansion of coffeehouses throughout the rest of Europe. Government policy fostered trade with India and China, and the government encouraged anything that would stimulate demand for tea. Tea had become fashionable at court; and teahouses, which drew their clientele from both sexes, began to become popular.

The growing popularity of tea is explained by its ease of preparation. "To brew tea, all that is needed is to add boiling water; coffee, in contrast, required roasting, grinding and brewing." Tea consumption rose in English society from 800,000 lb (360,000 kg) per annum in 1710 to 1,000,000 lb (450,000 kg) in 1721. As for the decline in coffee culture, Ellis concludes:

[Coffeehouses] had served their purpose and were no longer needed as meeting-places for political or literary criticism and debate. They had seen the nation pass through one of its greatest periods of trial and tribulation; had fought and won the battle for individual freedom; had acted as a steadying influence in an age of profligacy; and had given us a standard of prose-writing and literary criticism unequalled before or since.

== See also ==
- Ottoman coffeehouse
- Stuart period

== Sources ==
- Berry, Helen (2001). "Rethinking politeness in eighteenth-century England: Moll King's coffee house and the significance of 'flash talk': The Alexander Prize lecture". Transactions of the Royal Historical Society. 6th. 11: 65–81. doi:10.1017/S0080440101000044.
- Bramah, Edward (1972). Tea and Coffee: A Modern View of Three Hundred Years of Tradition. London: Hutchinson. OCLC 781998077.
- Cowan, Brian (2005). The Social Life of Coffee: The Emergence of the British Coffeehouse (PDF). New Haven: Yale University Press. ISBN 0-300-10666-1 – via BHSEC at WordPress.com.
- Ellis, Aytoun (1956). The Penny Universities: A History of the Coffee-houses. London: Secker & Warburg. OCLC 1616019.
- Ellis, Markman (2005). The Coffee-House: A Cultural History. London: Phoenix. ISBN 9780753818985..
- Lillywhite, Bryant (1963). London Coffeehouses: A Reference Book of Coffee Houses of the Seventeenth, Eighteenth and Nineteenth Centuries. London: George Allen and Unwin. OCLC 1524294395.
- Mackie, Erin, ed. (1998). The Commerce of Everyday Life: Selections from "The Tatler" and "The Spectator". Bedford Cultural Editions. Boston: Bedford/St. Martin's. ISBN 9780312115975 – via Internet Archive. (Also ISBN 9780312163716 and ISBN 9780333690918.)
- Outram, Dorinda (1995). The Enlightenment. Cambridge: Cambridge University Press. ISBN 0521415225. (Also ISBN 0521425344.)
- Van Horn Melton, James (2001). The Rise of the Public in Enlightenment Europe. Cambridge: Cambridge University Press. ISBN 0521465737. (Also ISBN 0521469694.)
- The women's petition against coffee representing to publick consideration the grand inconveniencies accruing to their sex from the excessive use of that drying, enfeebling liquor: presented to the right honorable the keepers of the liberty of Venus by a well-willer. London. 1674 – via Early English Books Online, University of Michigan Library Digital Collections.
