= Hamet =

Hamet may refer to:

== People ==
- Ali Hamet, Ottoman commander in the Battle of Alborán
- Barney Hamet, fictitious writer in several novels by Edward D. Hoch
- James Hamet Dunn, Canadian financier
- Jeffrey Hamet O'Neal, Irish miniature-painter
- Emmanuelle Hamet, French voice actress that voiced Ma in The Crumpets
- Mully Hamet, also known as Ahmad al-Mansur, Moroccan sultan
- Pavel Hamet, Canadian doctor and researcher

== Places ==
- Hamet, locally spelled Ħamet, an area of Xagħra, Gozo, Malta
- Hamet Jerid, Tozeur Governorate, Tunisia
