= Exchange Alley =

Alleyway in London, England

Coordinates: 51°30′47″N 0°05′13″W

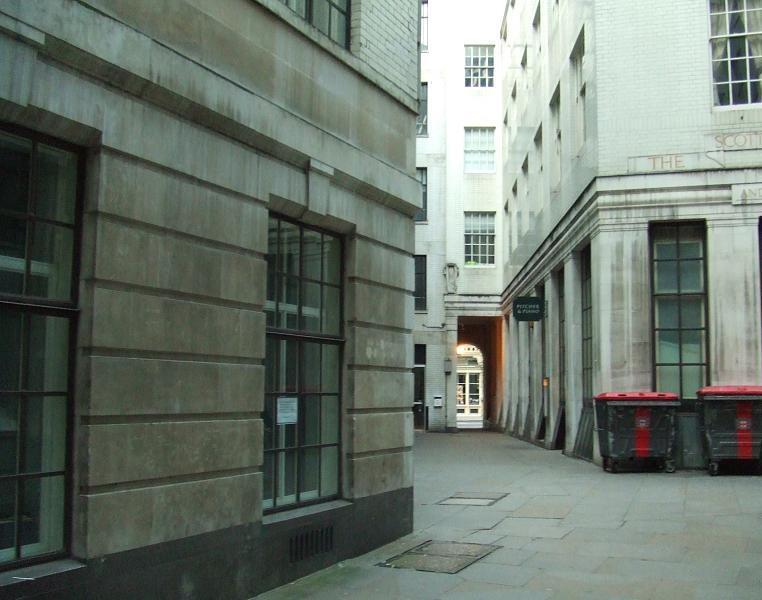
Change Alley in 2008

Exchange Alley or Change Alley is a narrow alleyway connecting shops and coffeehouses in an old neighbourhood of the City of London. It served as a convenient shortcut from the Royal Exchange on Cornhill to the Post Office on Lombard Street and remains as one of a number of alleys linking the two streets. Shops once located in Exchange Alley included ship chandlers, makers of navigation instruments such as telescopes, and goldsmiths from Lombardy in Italy.

The 17th and 18th century coffeehouses of Exchange Alley, especially Jonathan's and Garraway's, became an early venue for the lively trading of shares and commodities. These activities were the progenitor of the modern London Stock Exchange. Similarly, Lloyd's Coffee House, at No. 16 Lombard Street but originally on Tower Street, was the forerunner of Lloyd's of London, the Lloyd's Register and Lloyd's List.

The nearest London Underground station is Bank. The closest mainline railway station is Cannon Street.

== History ==
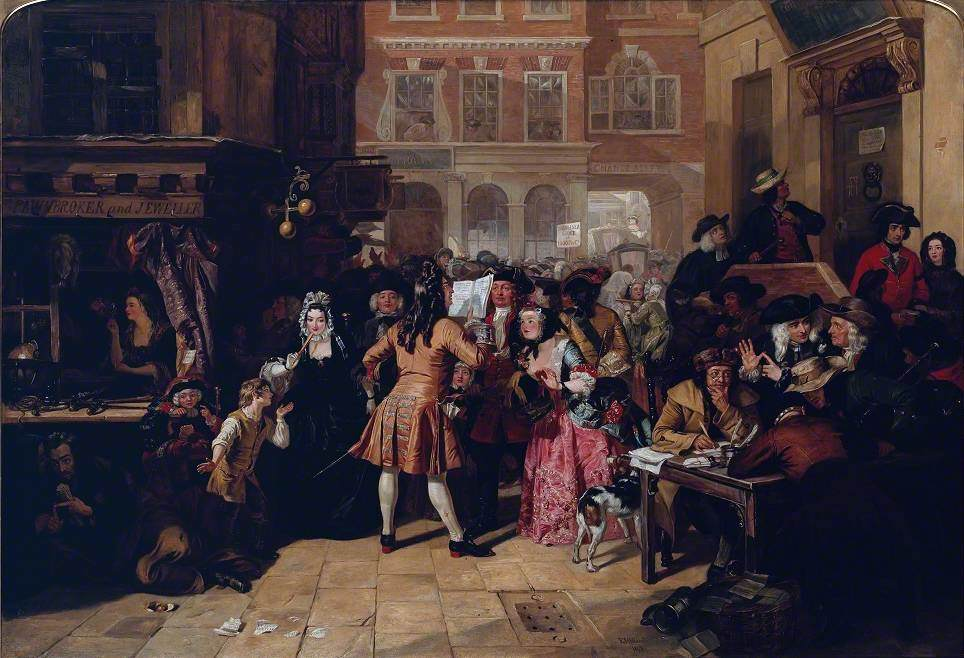
Exchange Alley is featured in Edward Matthew Ward's famous 1847 painting The South Sea Bubble

Lombard Street and Change Alley were the open-air meeting place of London's mercantile community before Thomas Gresham founded the Royal Exchange in 1565. In 1698, John Castaing began publishing the prices of stocks and commodities in Jonathan's Coffeehouse, providing the first evidence of systematic exchange of securities in London. Many stock jobbers, who had been expelled from the Royal Exchange for their rude manners, also migrated to Jonathan's and Garraway's.

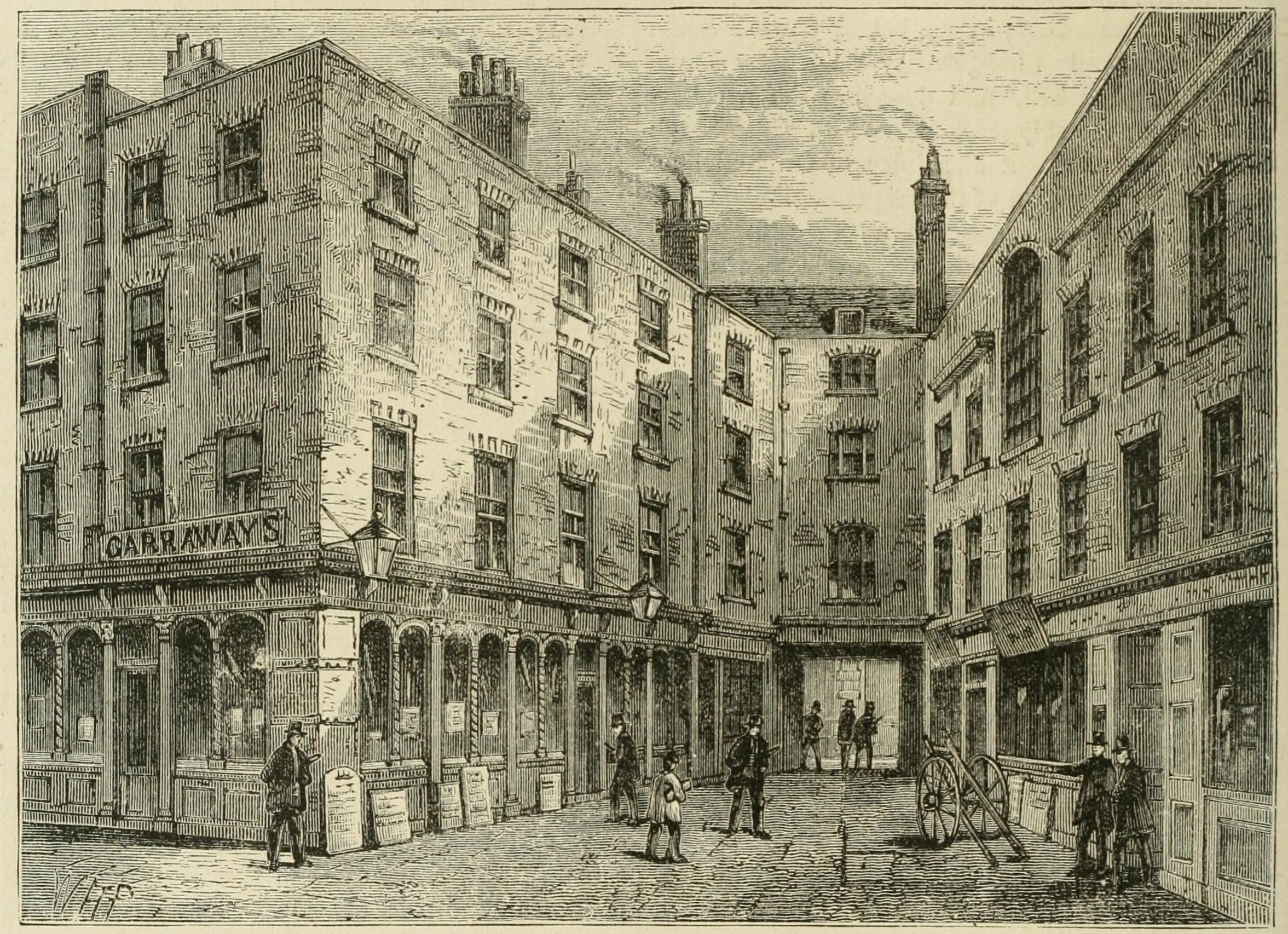
Exchange Alley in the 1740s

Change Alley was the site of some noteworthy events in England's financial history, including the South Sea Bubble from 1711 to 1720 and the panic of 1745. "The South Sea Bubble, a Scene in 'Change Alley in 1720'", Edward Matthew Ward's painting now in the Tate Gallery, skewers stock jobbers' opportunism and the foolishness of investors. Contemporary songs and sarcastic decks of cards are described in Charles Mackay's Memoirs of Extraordinary Popular Delusions and the Madness of Crowds.

Although lampooning the collapse of the South Sea Company has been a popular pastime, others have considered that "the basic outlines of the Anglo-American structure of finance were set by 1723 — a complementary set of private commercial and merchant banks all enjoying continuous access to an active, liquid secondary market for financial assets, especially government debt. The South Sea Bubble proved to be the "big bang" for financial capitalism in England."

In 1748, a fire started at a peruke-maker's in Exchange Alley, and from ninety to one hundred houses were burnt down in Exchange Alley, Cornhill and Birchin Lane. Many lives were lost and the fire destroyed the London Assurance Office, the "Swan", "Fleece", "Three Tuns" and "George and Vulture" taverns, and "Tom's" the "Rainbow" "Garraway's," "Jonathan's" and the "Jerusalem" coffee-houses. The fire also destroyed a rare collection of butterflies assembled by the Aurelian Society.

In 1761, a club of 150 brokers and jobbers was formed to trade stocks. In 1773, the club built its own building in Sweeting's Alley, dubbed the "New Jonathan's", later renamed the Stock Exchange.

== Maps ==
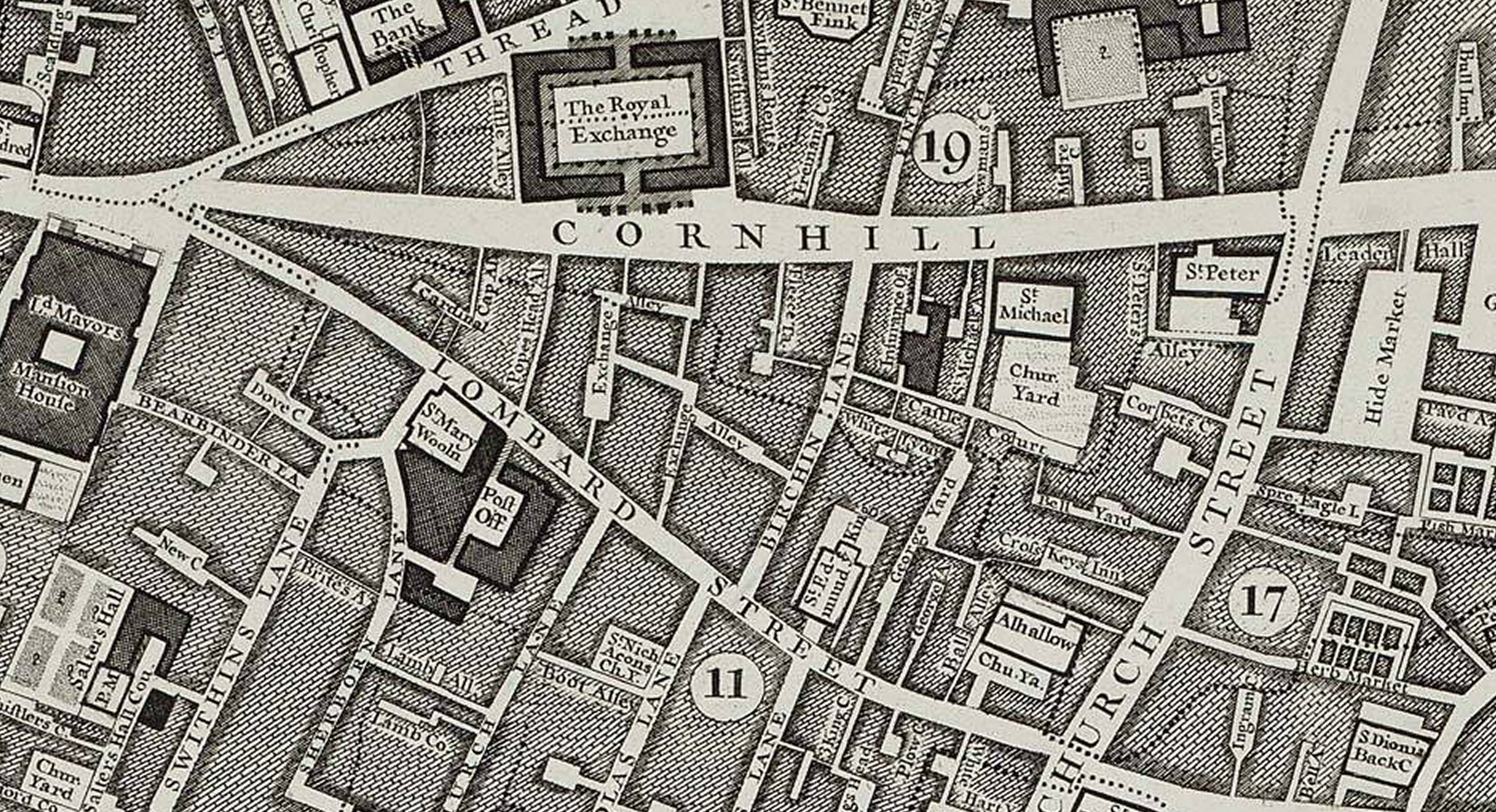
John Rocque's map, 1747

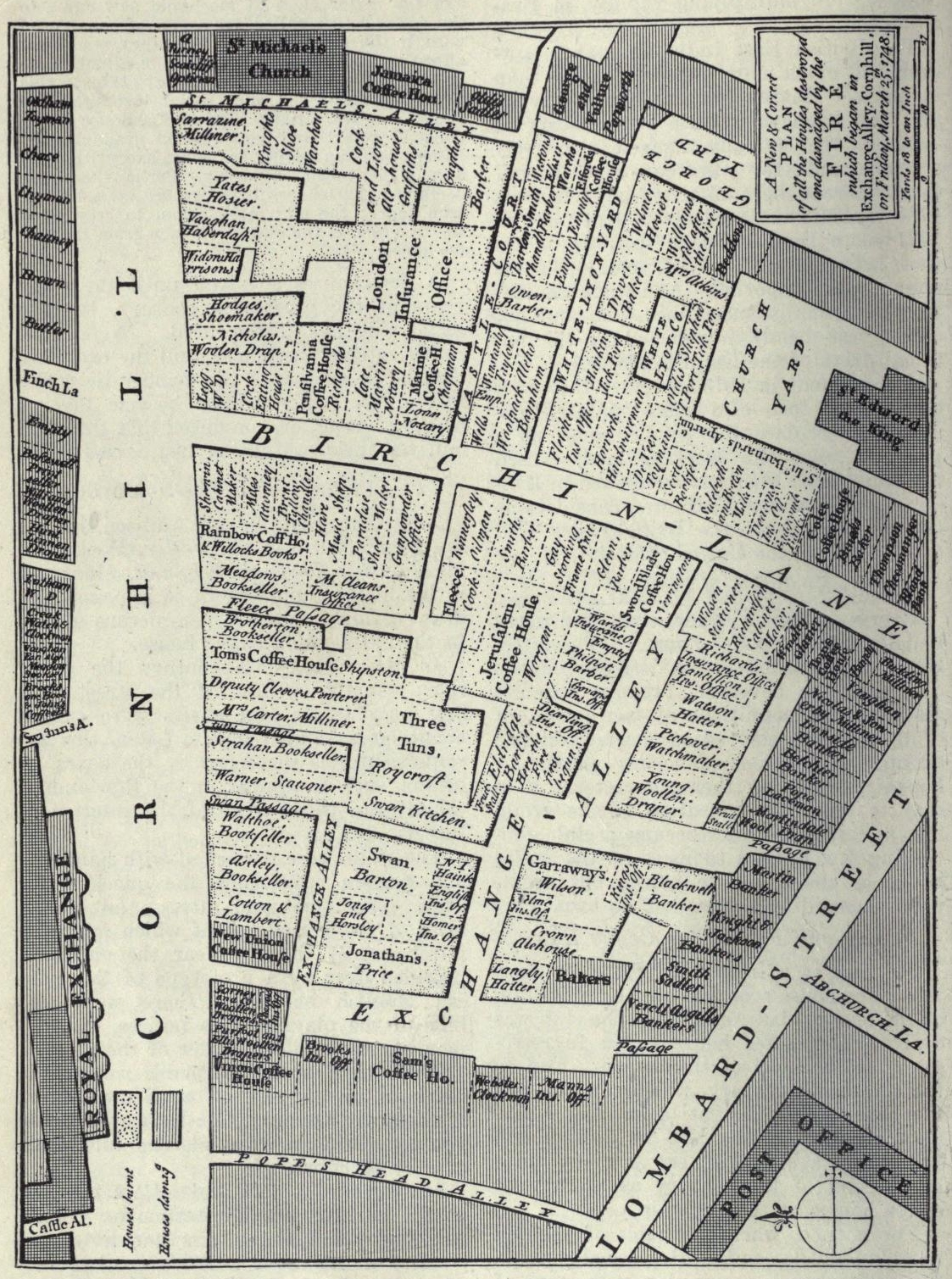
A map of coffee houses in Exchange Alley, prior to the 1748 fire

== Literature ==
- John Biddulph Martin, "The Grasshopper" in Lombard Street, New York, Scribner & Welford (1892).
- Dianne Dugaw, "High Change in 'Change Alley': Popular Ballads and Emergent Capitalism in the Eighteenth Century", Eighteenth-Century Life, Vol. 22, Number 2 (May, 1998), pp. 43–58.
- The Diary of Samuel Pepys, 28 May 1663.
- "The English Coffee Houses", Waes Hael Poetry & Tobacco Club. On Line.
