= Austrian Lloyd =

Austrian Lloyd may refer to

- a major shipping company of Imperial Austria, founded in 1833, see Österreichischer Lloyd
- a Cypriot company founded in 1991 or 1951, see Austrian Lloyd Ship Management
