= Jamaica Wine House =

Listed pub in the City of London, England

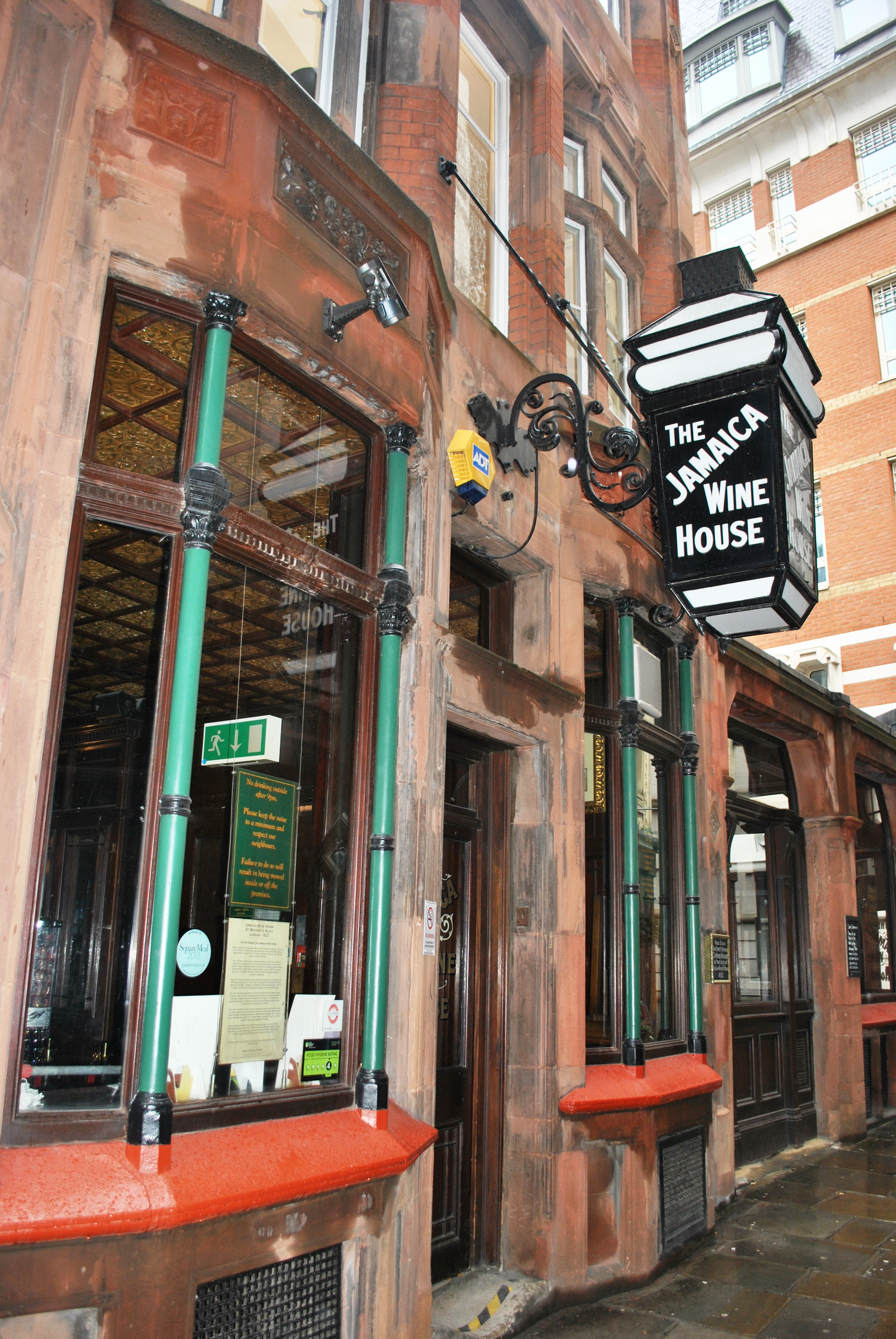
- The pub in 2013
- Alternative names: The Jampot

General information
- Type: Public house; originally a coffee house
- Location: St Michael's Alley, Cornhill, London, England
- Coordinates: 51.5130°N 0.0856°W
- Year built: Late 19th century
- Owner: Aubrey Investments Ltd

Design and construction
- Designations

Listed Building – Grade II
- Official name: Jamaica Wine House (Jamaica Buildings)
- Designated: 10 November 1977
- Reference no.: 1079156

Website
- jamaicawinehouse.co.uk

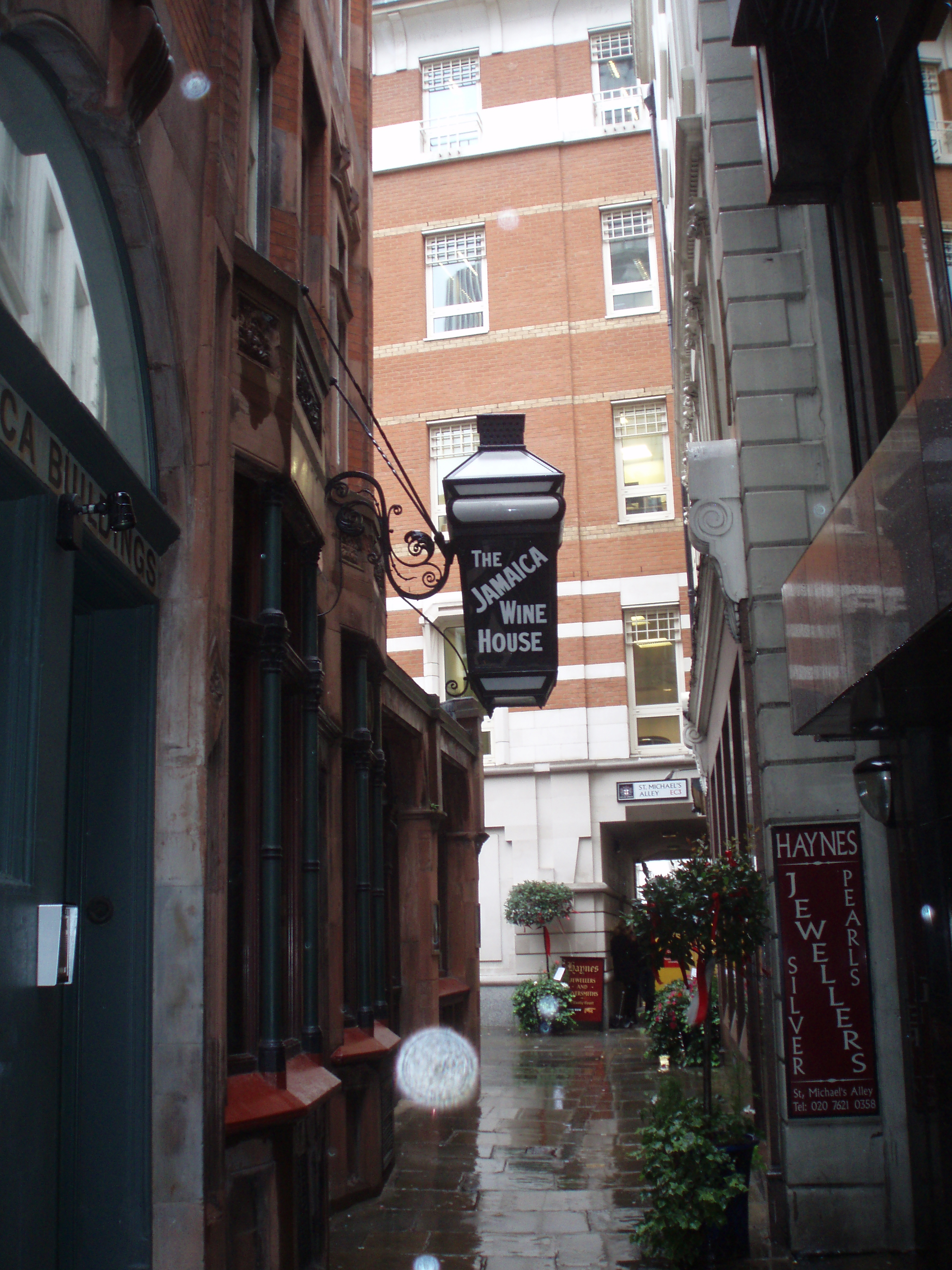
St Michael's Alley

The Jamaica Wine House, known locally as The Jampot, is a Grade II listed public house in St Michael's Alley, Cornhill, in the heart of London's financial district. Built in 1885, it stands on the site of the Jamaica Coffee House, traditionally regarded as London's first coffee house, which opened in 1652. The pub retains a historic interior recognised by the Campaign for Real Ale (CAMRA) as being of "outstanding national historic importance" and holds a three-star rating on its National Inventory of Historic Pub Interiors.

== History ==
The Jamaica Wine House was the first coffee house in London and was visited by the English diarist Samuel Pepys in 1660.

It has historic links to the sugar trade of the West Indies and the Ottoman Empire. There is a plaque on the wall which reads "Here stood the first London Coffee house at the sign of the Pasqua Rosee's Head 1652." Pasqua Rosée, the proprietor, was the servant of a Levant Company merchant named Daniel Edwards, a trader in Ottoman goods, who imported the coffee and assisted Rosée in setting up the establishment. The coffee house, which opened in 1652, is known in some accounts as the Turk's Head.

The present building, a Victorian public house, dates from 1885. This pub's licence was acquired by Shepherd Neame and the premises were reopened after a restoration that finished in April 2009.

On 10 November 1977, the Jamaica Wine House was designated a Grade II listed building. It is regarded by the Campaign for Real Ale (CAMRA) as having an interior of "outstanding national historic importance" and is rated three stars on its National Inventory of Historic Pub Interiors. As of September 2026, the freehold was owned by Aubrey Investments Ltd and the pub was leased by Shepherd Neame.

== Relation to the Atlantic slave trade ==
Most of the coffee houses in 17th and 18th-century London were involved in the transoceanic slave trade in some way. The Jamaica Coffee House accommodated all sorts of individuals buying and selling cargo from Jamaica, including people.

'To be Sold Cheap, THE Nancy Pleasure-Yacht, Lute stern'd, Burthen about twenty Tons, with very good Accommodations, sails very well, and exceedingly well sound, now lying near the King's Mills, Rotherhith [sic]. Also a Negro Boy, about fifteen Years old, every Way qualified to attend on Gentlemen or Ladies. For further Particulars enquire at the Bar of the Jamaica Coffee-House in St. Michael's Alley, Cornhill.' Daily Advertiser, London, 2 August 1744.

London newspapers throughout the late 1600s and 1700s printed many appeals for information regarding enslaved and bonded runaways that gave the Jamaica coffee house as their point of contact. Like the advert placed on the 8th August 1728 seeking information about an African woman aged about 25, known as Caelia Edlyne, who chose to leave the house and service of her unnamed master in Blackheath. The use of the surname Edlyne indicates that she was connected to, and named by, a member of the Edlyne family.

The use of the Jamaica Coffee House as a point of contact indicates Caelia and the Edlyne's have a connection to Jamaica. An Edmund Edlyne is recorded as owner of the River, Mountain and Wag Water (later known as Prospect), plantations in St Andrew and St Thomas in the East parishes of Jamaica in the early 1700s. Residing in Kingston, Edmund was a member of the Council in Assembly of Jamaica, who returned to England some time prior to 1712 and is named in another advert seeking the capture and return of a mixed heritage enslaved man called Andrew in 1713, who was employed as a domestic servant in Hampshire.

'Andrew, of a middle Stature, 23 Years old, 4 of his Teeth of his upper Jaw out before, pitted with the Small-Pox, has short Nails on his Fingers, speaks good English, wears a light-grey Cloath Livery Coat, lined with Red... Run away from his Master Colonel Edmund Edlyne from King's-Cleare in Hampshire, and 'tis believed he is In or about London'.

By 1717, he had decided to remain in England and was, at that time, lodged in Woodford, Essex. Records reveal that, now a widower, he married Ann Elletson, who was connected to another family of planters in St Andrews Jamaica.

Edmund and Ann Edlyne's access to enslaved people of colour in Jamaica indicates that Caelia accompanied either or both of them to Britain prior to 1728. Edmund later passed his Jamaican properties over to his son Thomas, which were later inherited by his grandson Thomas Hope Edlyne. The advert mentions that Caelia bore the 'Mark of her Country' revealing she had ritual scarification, to denote her tribal membership.

== Architecture ==
=== Exterior ===
The building is constructed of red brick with red stone dressings and consists of a three-storey main block with an attic storey, together with a single-storey extension to the south. The principal elevation to St Michael's Alley is symmetrically arranged with three bays. At ground-floor level, a central entrance to the wine house is flanked by slightly projecting canted bays with slender Gothic-style colonnettes dividing the windows. The upper floors continue the symmetrical composition and incorporate decorative carved panels above the windows. A separate entrance in the northern bay, marked "Jamaica Buildings", provides access to the upper storeys.

A linking block of similar design connects the building to St Michael, Cornhill. This incorporates a vaulted passage at ground-floor level, with round-arched openings providing access to the church and churchyard. Dating from 1868, the structure forms part of George Gilbert Scott's alterations to the church and includes Gothic detailing designed to complement the adjoining building. The rear elevation facing the churchyard is comparatively plain and constructed of red brick.

The single-storey southern extension is executed in an Art Nouveau style and features slender red sandstone piers. Its south elevation is divided into four bays, with two large arched windows separated by narrower sections containing decorative panels and circular windows.

=== Interior ===
The interior is notable for its unusual layout, which is divided into four separate compartments by three mahogany screens set at right angles to the bar counter. This arrangement is considered highly unusual and may be unique among surviving pub interiors.

The screens are decorated with square panelling and glazed sections and appear to be original. The distinction between the two halves of the interior is reinforced by different ceiling treatments, including decorative ceramic or enamelled-metal panels on one side. The original bar counter survives, although it has been altered in part of the pub. The bar-back and fixed seating are later replacements.

== See also ==
- List of pubs in London
