= Charles Baldwin (MP) =

English politician

Charles Baldwen (born 1593) was an English politician who sat in the House of Commons from 1640 to 1644. He supported the Royalist cause in the English Civil War.

Baldwin was the son of William Baldwin of Elsich, in the parish of Diddlebury. In April 1640, Baldwin was elected Member of Parliament for Ludlow in the Short Parliament. He was re-elected MP for Ludlow for the Long Parliament in November 1640. He was disabled from sitting in parliament on 5 February 1644 for deserting the service of the house, being in the kings quarters, and adhering to that party. He compounded his estate for delinquency and was obliged to pay £586.

Baldwin married, in 1617, a daughter of Francis Holland of Burwarton, Shropshire. He had two sons, Samuel and Timothy, who were both eminent lawyers and received knighthoods.

Parliament of England
Vacant Parliament suspended since 1629	Member of Parliament for Ludlow; 1640–1644; With: Ralph Goodwin	Succeeded by Thomas Mackworth; Thomas Moor
