= Lloyd's Coffee House =

Historic coffee shop in London, England

Coordinates: 51.5127483°N 0.087497°W

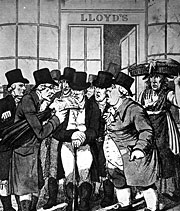
A 19th-century drawing of Lloyd's Coffee House.

This blue plaque on Lombard Street marks the location of the former coffee house.

Lloyd's Coffee House was a significant meeting place in London in the 17th and 18th centuries.

Lloyd's of London, Lloyd's Register and Lloyd's List all have origins connected to the coffee house.

== History ==
In 1686, the coffee house was opened by Edward Lloyd (c. 1648 – 15 February 1713) on Tower Street. It was a popular place for sailors, merchants and shipowners, and Lloyd catered to them by providing reliable shipping news. The shipping industry community frequented Lloyd's to discuss maritime insurance, shipbroking and foreign trade. The dealings that took place led to the establishment of the insurance market Lloyd's of London, Lloyd's Register, Lloyd's List, and several related shipping and insurance businesses.

In December 1691, the coffee shop relocated to Lombard Street. Lloyd had a pulpit installed in the new premises, from which maritime auction prices and shipping news were announced. Candle auctions were held in Lloyd's, with lots frequently involving ships and shipping. From 1696–1697 Lloyd also experimented with publishing a newspaper, Lloyd's News, reporting on shipping schedules and insurance agreements reached in the coffee house.

In 1713, the year of Edward Lloyd's death, he modified his will to assign the lease of the coffee house to his head waiter, William Newton, who then married one of Lloyd's daughters, Handy. Newton died the following year and Handy married Samuel Sheppard. She died in 1720. Sheppard died in 1727, leaving the coffee house to his sister Elizabeth and her husband, Thomas Jemson. Jemson founded the Lloyd's List newspaper in 1734, similar to the previous Lloyd's News. Merchants continued to discuss insurance matters there until 1774, when the participating members of the insurance arrangement formed a committee and moved to the Royal Exchange on Cornhill as the Society of Lloyd's.

Eric Williams notes in his book, Capitalism and Slavery, that The London Gazette published many advertisements about runaway slaves which listed Lloyd's coffeehouse (when it was only a coffee house at that point) as the place where they should be returned. Lloyd's eventually became one of the foremost English insurers of slaves and slave ships in the Atlantic slave trade.

== Traces of the coffee house ==
The 17th-century original shop frontage of Lloyd's Coffee House is owned by Lloyd's of London. In 2011, it was temporarily re-erected on display at the National Maritime Museum. A blue plaque in Lombard Street commemorates the coffee house's second location, now occupied at ground level by Sainsbury's supermarket. It was fictionalized in the 1936 film Lloyd's of London.

== Organisations named after the coffee house ==
The following is a list of organisations named after Lloyd's Coffee House:

- Austrian Lloyd:
  - Österreichischer Lloyd: an Austrian, major mediterranean shipping company founded in 1833, which after World War I became Lloyd Triestino
  - Austrian Lloyd Ship Management: a Cypriot company founded in 1991
- Germanischer Lloyd, Germany
- Hapag-Lloyd, transportation, Germany
- Hapag-Lloyd Express, airline, Germany
- Hapag-Lloyd Flug, airline, Germany
- Lloyd Aéreo Boliviano, airline, Bolivia
- Lloyd's List and Lloyd's List Intelligence (formerly Lloyd's MIU), shipping news, London
- Lloyd's of London, insurance, London, and the Lloyd's Agency Network they created
- Lloyd's Register, risk assessment and mitigation services and management systems certification (originally maritime), London
- Norddeutscher Lloyd, shipping, Germany, and the Lloyd (car) created by a subsidiary, and the Lloyd Werft dockyard they also own
- P&O Nedlloyd (incorporating Nedlloyd shipping)
- Delta Lloyd Group (incorporating Nedlloyd insurance founded 1854)

Lloyds Bank and its related organisations are not named after the London coffee house. The bank was founded in Birmingham by Sampson Lloyd.

== See also ==
- Jonathan's Coffee-House, the progenitor of the London Stock Exchange
- Garraway's Coffee House
