= Lawrence Eliot Klein =

Lawrence Eliot Klein is an historian and fellow at Emmanuel College, University of Cambridge. Klein is a specialist in the cultural history of eighteenth-century Britain and particularly ideas and practices associated with the concept of politeness.

== Selected publications ==
- Shaftesbury and the Culture of Politeness: Moral Discourse and Cultural Politics in Early Eighteenth-Century England, Cambridge University Press, 1994.
- Enthusiasm and Enlightenment in Europe, 1650-1850 (co-edited with Anthony LaVopa), Huntington Library Press, 1998
- Edition of Shaftesbury's Characteristicks of Men, Manners, Opinions, Times, Cambridge University Press, 1999.
