= Timothy Baldwin =

English academic and lawyer

Sir Timothy Baldwin (1620–1696), was an English academic and lawyer.

== Biography ==
Baldwin was the younger son of Charles Baldwin of Burwarton, Shropshire and his wife who was a daughter of Francis Holland, of Burwarton. He became a commoner of Balliol College, Oxford in 1635 and was also a student of the Inner Temple in 1635. He was awarded a Bachelor of Arts at Oxford on 13 October 1638 and in 1639 he was elected Fellow of All Souls' College, where he lived during the English Civil War. He was awarded Bachelor of Civil Law on 26 June 1641. As a royalist he was deprived of his fellowship by the Parliamentary Commissioners in 1648, but an application on his behalf to the wife of Thomas Kelsey, deputy-governor of the city of Oxford, accompanied by "certain gifts", secured his speedy reinstatement. In 1652 he was awarded Doctor of Civil Law. He is mentioned by Wood in his autobiography (ed. Bliss, p. xxv) as joining in 1655 a number of Royalists "who esteem'd themselves either virtuosi or wits" in encouraging an Oxford apothecary to sell "coffey publickly in his house against All Soules Coll".

At the Restoration, Baldwin was nominated a royal commissioner to inquire into the state of the university and was admitted principal of Hart Hall, Oxford (now Hertford College) on 21 June 1660. He also became a member of the College of Civilians. In 1661, he resigned his fellowship, and was nominated chancellor of the Dioceses of Hereford and Worcester. For twelve years, from 1670 to 1682, he was a Master in Chancery (Foss's Judges, vii. 8). He was knighted in July 1670 and was then described as of Stoke Castle, Shropshire. In 1679–80 he was acting as one of the clerks in the House of Lords, and actively engaged in procuring evidence against the five lords charged with a treasonable Catholic conspiracy. At the time of his death in 1696, he held the office of steward of Leominster.

== Literary work ==
Baldwin was the author of "The Privileges of an Ambassador, written by way of letter to a friend who desired his opinion concerning the Portugal Ambassador", 1654. This very rare tract treats of the charge of manslaughter preferred in an English court against Don Pantaleone, brother of the Portuguese ambassador. Baldwin also translated into Latin and published in 1656 Lord Herbert of Cherbury's History of the Expedition to Rhé in 1627. The English original, which was written in 1630, was first printed in 1870 by the Philobiblon Society. In 1663 Baldwin edited and published The Jurisdiction of the Admiralty of England asserted against Sir Edward Coke's "Articuli Auctoritatis" in xxii. chapter of his "Jurisdiction of Courts" by Richard Zouch, Doctor of the Civil Laws and late Judge of the High Court of Admiralty, 1663' Baldwin contributed a brief preface to this work dated "Doctors' Commons, 25 February 1663".

== Family ==
Baldwin married firstly Lady Ellen Norton, widow of Sir George Norton of Abbots Leigh, Briston, and daughter of Sir William Owen of Condover. He married secondly Mary Acton, widow of Nicholas Acton and daughter of Gerard Skrymshire of Aqualate.
