= Helen Berry =

British historian

Helen Berry FRHistS FRSA
- Born: 11 December 1969 (age 56)
- Occupation: Professor of British History
- Awards: In April 2024, Berry was inducted to the Collegium of Scholars, College of Ministers and Laity, Martin Luther King Jr Chapel, Morehouse College

Academic background
- Education: Cambridge University
- Doctoral advisor: Keith Wrightson

Academic work
- Discipline: History
- Sub-discipline: British History
- Institutions: Newcastle University University of Exeter
- Main interests: Social history 18th century Britain
- Website: https://en.m.wikipedia.org/wiki/Morehouse_Collegehttp://www.helenberry.net/

Helen Berry (born 11 December 1969) is a British historian and Professor of British History at the University of Exeter. She specialises in British history in a global context between 1660 and 1800, with particular interests in social, cultural and economic history, the history of gender and sexuality, the family, the rise of the mass media and coffee house culture.

== Education ==
Berry read history at Durham University from 1989 to 1992. She was president of the Durham Union for Easter term of 1991. Her doctoral research was at Jesus College, University of Cambridge 1995–1998, where she wrote a thesis on the history of coffee houses and the earliest London newspapers. In 2000 she was awarded the Royal Historical Society Alexander Prize for the paper ‘Rethinking Politeness in Eighteenth-Century England: Moll King’s Coffee House and the Significance of Flash Talk’ based on her thesis

== Career and research ==
Following her PhD, Berry was a postdoctoral fellow at the University of Essex (September 1998 – July 1999), and a postdoctoral researcher at Northumbria University (July 1999 – September 2000), before taking up a lectureship in history at Newcastle University in September 2000. She was promoted to professor in June 2012. She has also held visiting professorship positions at the Harry Ransom Humanities Library, University of Texas at Austin, and the Huntington Library, San Marina California. She is a former dean of postgraduate studies (2015–2018) and acting pro-vice chancellor (2018), Faculty of Humanities and Social Sciences at Newcastle University. From February 2019 - September 2020 she was head of the School of History, Classics and Archaeology at Newcastle, before moving to the University of Exeter where she is currently Head of History. She is also adjunct assistant professor at IUPUI Department of History, IU School of Liberal Arts.

Her research covers a wide range of themes, from the history of how a new kind of consumer society emerged in Britain during the eighteenth century, to how global trade and economics shaped personal experiences, families and communities. She also has interests in the history of the mass media from the late-seventeenth century onwards; coffee house sociability and politeness; the history of gender and sexuality, particularly in the shifting definitions of marriage over time. Her book, The Castrato and His Wife (published by OUP in 2011) explores the impact of Italian culture in the British Isles. Her most recent book, ''Orphans of Empire: the Fate of London's Foundlings'' (published by OUP in 2019) examines the connection between philanthropy, child welfare and the socio-economic development of Britain in an era of colonial expansion. The book featured on Dan Snow’s History Hit podcast in May 2019.

Berry has presented for the BBC, including a feature on BBC1's Inside/Out programme about the archaeologist, explorer and diplomat Gertrude Bell.

== Awards and honours ==
She is a Fellow of the Royal Historical Society, and Fellow of the Royal Society of Arts, Manufactures and Commerce. Her book The Castrato and his Wife was featured as Book of the Week on Radio 4 Her book Orphans of Empire was shortlisted for the 2019 Cundill History Prize.
