= John Houghton (apothecary) =

English apothecary and writer (1645–1705)

- Born: 1645
- Died: 1705 (aged 59–60)
- Education: Corpus Christi College, Cambridge
- Occupations: Apothecary, writer
- Known for: Fellow of the Royal Society
- Spouse: Elizabeth Claget

John Houghton (1645 – 1705) was an English apothecary and writer on agriculture and trade, a Fellow of the Royal Society.

== Life ==
Houghton studied for a time at Corpus Christi College, Cambridge. He subsequently became an apothecary and dealer in tea, coffee, chocolate, and other luxuries. First he traded by the Ship Tavern in St Bartholomew Lane, St Bartholomew-by-the-Exchange, behind the Royal Exchange. By 14 December 1703, he was at the Golden Fleece, on the corner of Little Eastcheap in Gracechurch Street, London.

A kind of agent for advertisers, Houghton had his newspaper advertisements appended to his Collections. On 19 July 1695, Houghton printed the first personal ad from a man seeking a wife in A Collection for Improvement of Husbandry and Trade, initiating the "lonely hearts" industry. He was elected Fellow of the Royal Society. on 29 January 1680, and served on the society's committee for agriculture. He died in 1705.

== Works ==
Houghton edited a periodical, A Collection of Letters for the Improvement of Husbandry & Trade, published as two vols. London, 1681–3. The authors of the letters included John Evelyn and John Worlidge. Houghton first noticed the potato plant as an agricultural vegetable, and that turnips were eaten by sheep.

In November 1691, Houghton issued, with the support of leading Fellows of the Royal Society, A Proposal for Improvement of Husbandry and Trade, which later took the shape of another Collection published in weekly folio numbers, of which the first appeared on 30 March 1692, and the last (No. 583) on 24 September 1703. In all, according to the editor's plan, 19 volumes appeared. A selection in four volumes was published by Richard Bradley in 1727–8, with the title A Catalogue of all sorts of Earths, the Art of Draining, of Brewing, of all sorts of Husbandry.

Houghton also published in 1693 a sixpenny sheet, containing An Account of the Acres and Houses, with the proportional tax … of each county in England and Wales (reprinted in Somers Tracts, ed. Scott, x. 596). To Philosophical Transactions he contributed in 1699 "A Discourse of Coffee" and "The Conclusion of the Protestant States of the Empire, of the 23d of Sept. 1699 concerning the Calendar".

== Family ==
On 11 November 1687 Houghton married Elizabeth Claget of Greenwich in 1687.

== Notes ==
Attribution

- This article incorporates text from a publication now in the public domain: Lee, Sidney, ed. (1891). "Houghton, John (d.1705)". Dictionary of National Biography. Vol. 27. London: Smith, Elder & Co.
