= Garraway's Coffee House =

London coffee house in Exchange Alley

Coordinates: 51.5129°N 0.0870°W

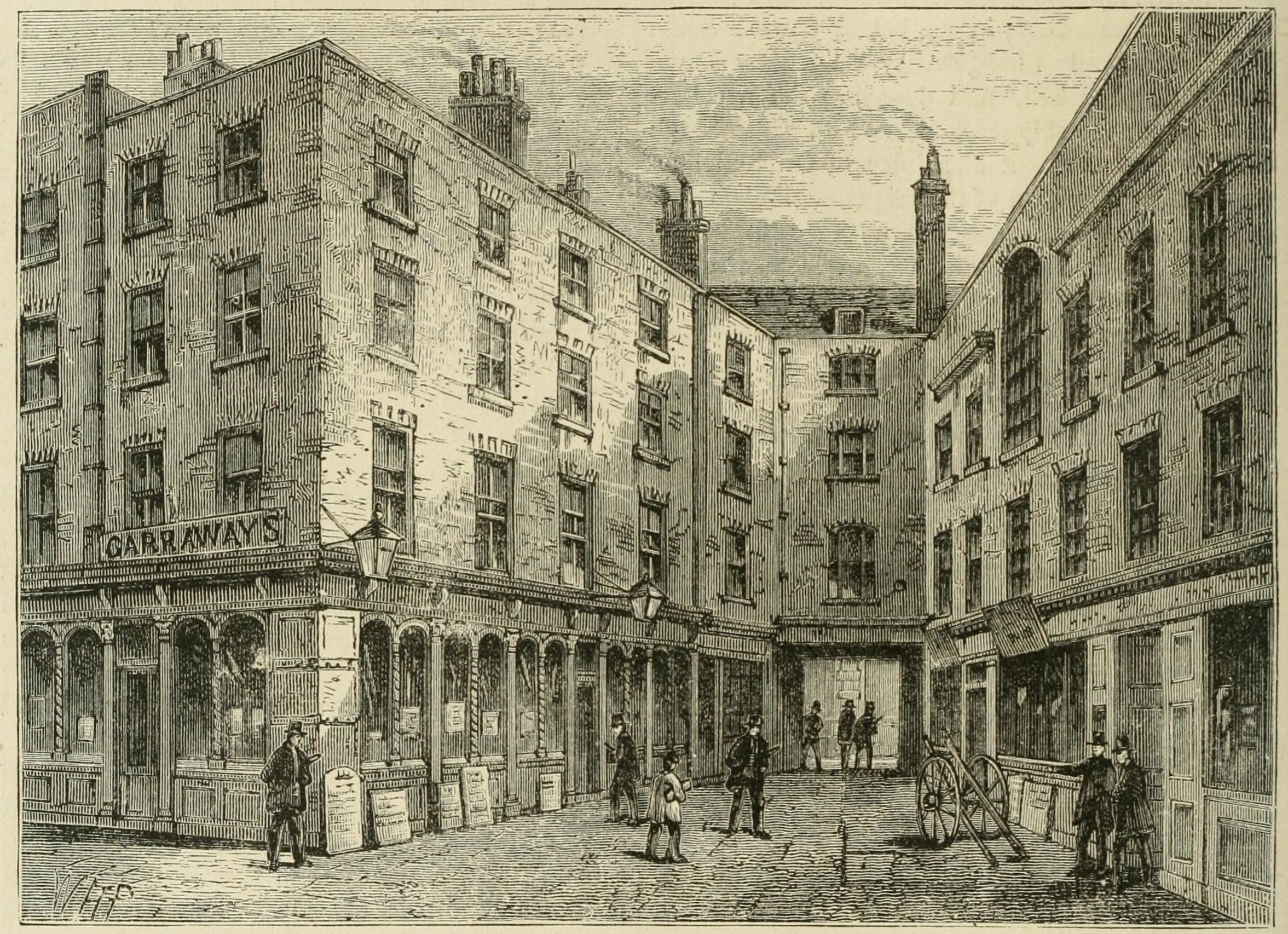
Garraway's Coffee House shortly before its demolition

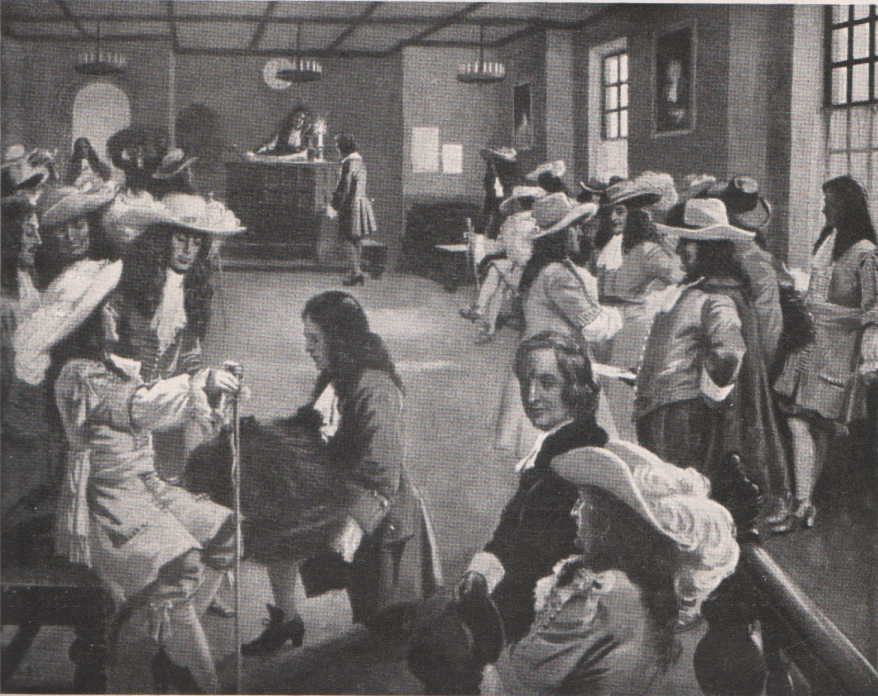
In 1671 the Hudson's Bay Company sold its first furs at Garraway's Coffee House.

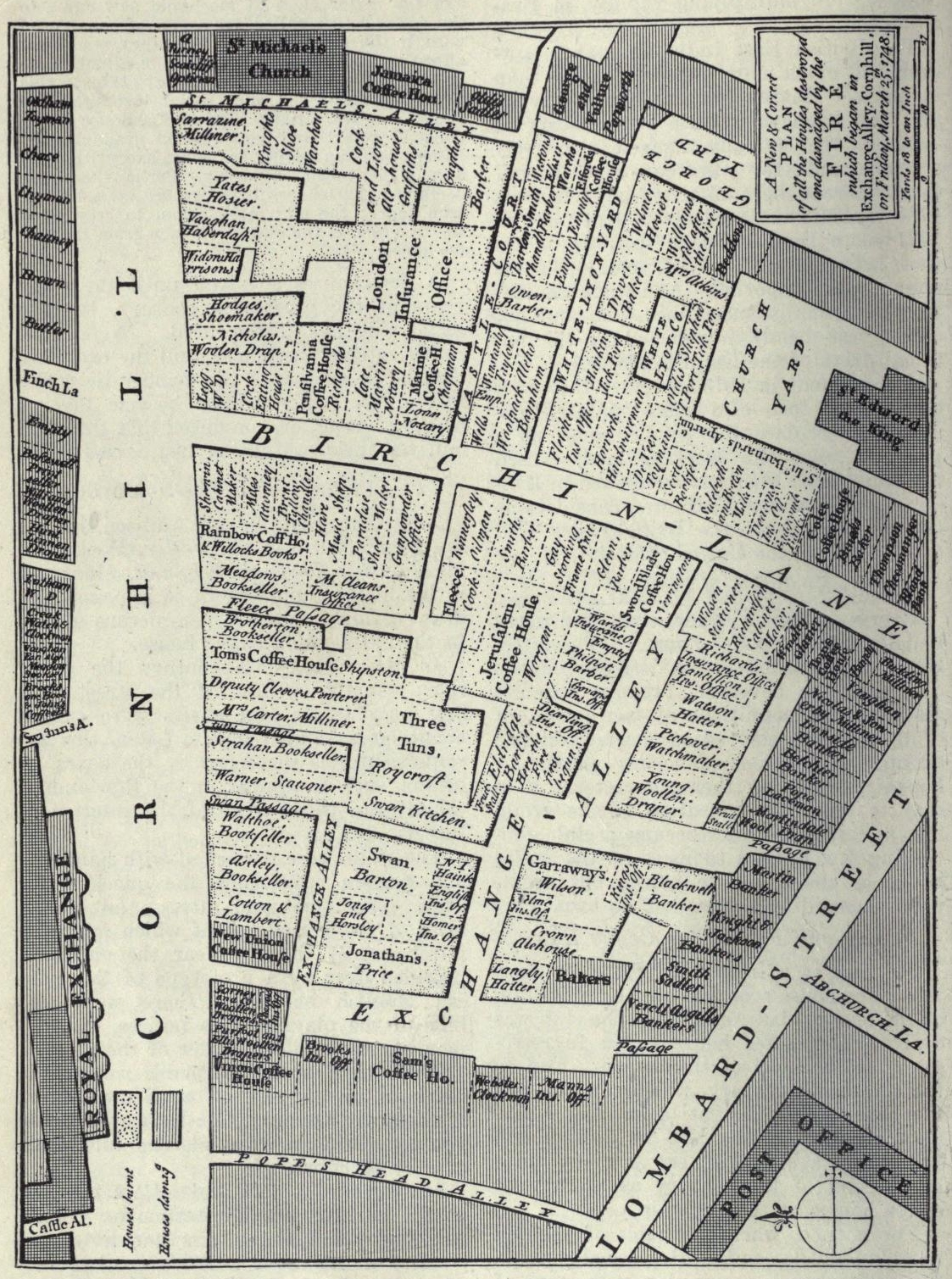
A map of coffee houses in Exchange Alley, prior to the 1748 fire

Garraways Coffee House was a London coffee house in Exchange Alley from the period when such houses served as important places where other business was performed. Its original proprietor, Thomas Garway, was already said to be the first person in England to sell tea prior to the house's founding, and when he began to sell it here in 1657 it became the first place in England to do so. The Hudson's Bay Company conducted its first sale of furs at the coffee house in 1671.

Different kinds of merchants patronised different coffee houses, with tea merchants patronising Garraway's, as well as many investors in the South Sea Bubble of the 1710s. The establishment became famous as a sandwich and drinking room, it being said that the sandwich-maker spent two hours preparing each day's food.

The works of Charles Dickens include multiple references to Garraway's, and Daniel Defoe wrote of it being frequented by wealthy traders from the City.

In the early days of the Australian wool industry, imported Australian wool was auctioned at Garraway's. Each bale was bid for in the time it took a candle to burn down one inch.

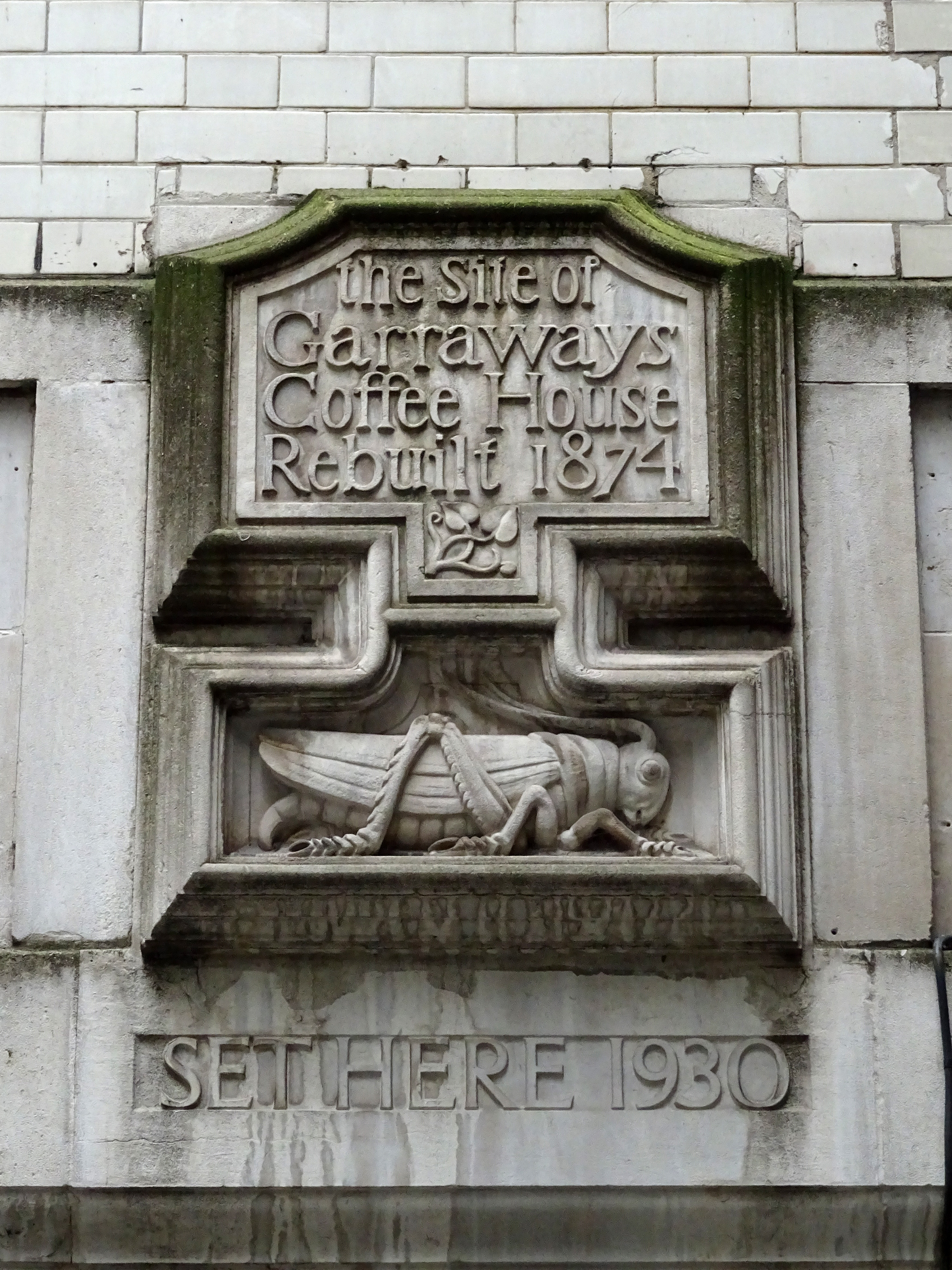
The site of Garraway's Coffee House, rebuilt 1874

== See also ==
- Jonathan's Coffee-House, the progenitor of the London Stock Exchange
- Lloyd's Coffee House, a formative meeting place of the shipping and insurance industries
