= Jonathan's Coffee-House =

London coffeehouse; original home of the London Stock Exchange

Coordinates: 51.5129°N 0.0870°W

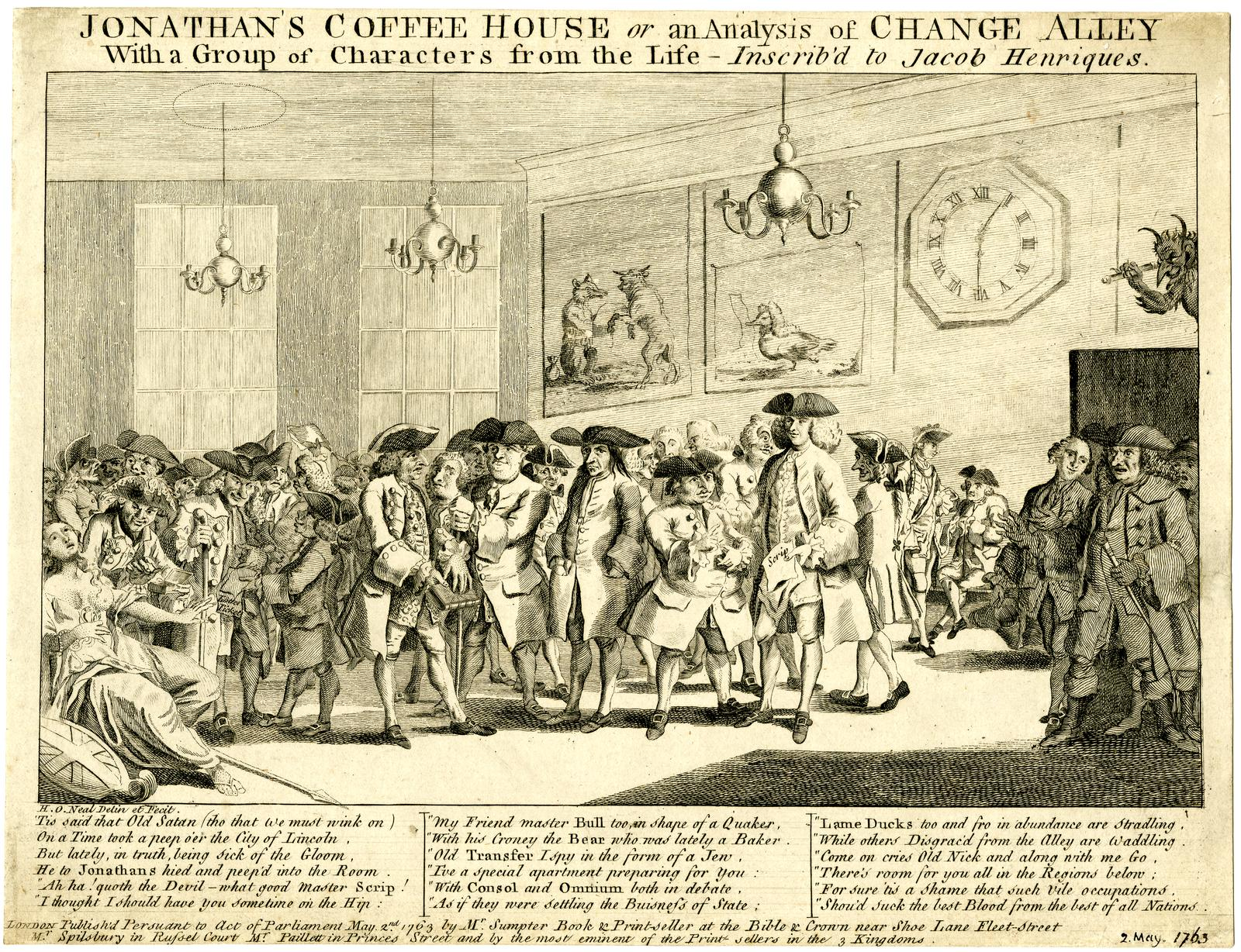
Engraving, 1763, ascribed to Jeffrey Hamet O'Neal

Jonathan's Coffee House was a significant meeting place in London in the 17th and 18th centuries, famous as the original site of the London Stock Exchange.

== History ==
The coffee house was opened around 1680 by Jonathan Miles in Change (or Exchange) Alley, in the City of London. In 1696, several patrons were implicated in a plot to assassinate William III, and it was thought to be associated with the Popish Plots.

As of 1694, Jonathan's was one of a few coffee houses where one could meet stockbrokers and obtain prices. In 1698, John Castaing, one broker, used the coffee house to post the prices of stocks and commodities, in a list titled "The Course of the Exchange and Other Things". That year, dealers expelled from the Royal Exchange for rowdiness migrated to Jonathan's and Garraway's Coffee-House.

It was the scene of a number of critical events in the history of share trading, including the South Sea Bubble and the panic of 1745. By 1748, the London securities market was centred at Jonathan's. That year, it was destroyed by fire, and rebuilt. In 1761, a club of 150 brokers and jobbers was formed to trade stocks. In 1773, the club built its own building in Sweeting's Alley, which was dubbed the New Jonathan's. It was later renamed the Stock Exchange, now officially called the London Stock Exchange.

The original Jonathan's served as the home of a lottery office until it was destroyed by fire in 1748.

"The Anatomy of Exchange Alley", a 1719 pamphlet by Daniel Defoe, describes Jonathan's as follows:

The centre of the jobbing is in the kingdom of Exchange-alley and its adjacencies. The limits are easily surrounded in about a minute and a half: viz. stepping out of Jonathan's into the Alley, you turn your face full south; moving on a few paces, and then turning due east, you advance to Garraway's; from thence going out at the other door, you go on still east into Birchin-lane; and then halting a little at the Sword-blade Bank, to do much mischief in fewest words, you immediately face to the north, enter Cornhill, visit two or three petty provinces there in your way west; and thus having boxed your compass, and sailed round the whole stock-jobbing globe, you turn into Jonathan's again; and so, as most of the great follies of life oblige us to do, you end just where you began.

Susanna Centlivre, in A Bold Stroke for a Wife, has a scene from Jonathan's at the above period. While the stock-jobbers are talking, waiters exclaim, "Fresh coffee, gentlemen, fresh coffee! Bohea tea, gentlemen!"

== See also ==
- Lloyd's of London
- Garraway's Coffee House

== Works cited ==
- Hennessy, Elizabeth (2001). Coffee House to Cyber Market: 200 Years of the London Stock Exchange. Ebury Publishing. ISBN 978-0-09-187096-6.
