= Austrian Lloyd Ship Management =

Cypriot shipping company

Oesterreichischer Lloyd Seereederei (Cyprus) Ltd
- Type: Private
- Founded: 1836 (originally), 1991 (as OELSR)
- Headquarters: Limassol, Cyprus
- Key people: Capt. E. Koch (Chairman, CEO & Partner)
- Products: Commercial transport
- Website: Official website

Oesterreichischer Lloyd Seereederei (Cyprus) Ltd (OELSR) is a privately owned shipping company based in Limassol, Cyprus. The company has historical roots dating back to 1836 when it was founded in the Mediterranean region. It was officially established in its current form in 1991. OELSR is currently led by its chairman, CEO and partner, Capt. E. Koch.

The company owns and operates a fleet of seven vessels, with an average age of 6.5 years, all registered under the Cyprus flag. OELSR specializes in various types of commercial transport, including container ships, multi-purpose vessels (MPPs), bulk carriers, reefer vessels, chemical/oil tankers, and cruise vessels, with a particular focus on the MPP segment.

== Fleet ==
- MCP Graz
- MCP Linz
- MCP Salzburg
- MCP Vienna
- MCP Villach
- Wilson Sky
- Wilson Hook
- Wilson Hull
- Amurdiep

== See also ==
- List of shipping companies
