= Jeffrey Hamet O'Neal =

Irish painter

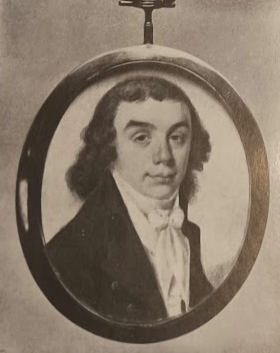
- portrait by E. Miles c. 1790
- Born: 1734; Ireland
- Died: 1801 (aged 66–67)
- Occupations: miniature and pottery painter

Jeffrey Hamet O'Neal, sometimes written Jefferyes Hammett O'Neale, (1734-1801) was an Irish miniature-painter, pottery painter, and satirical printmaker.

== Life ==
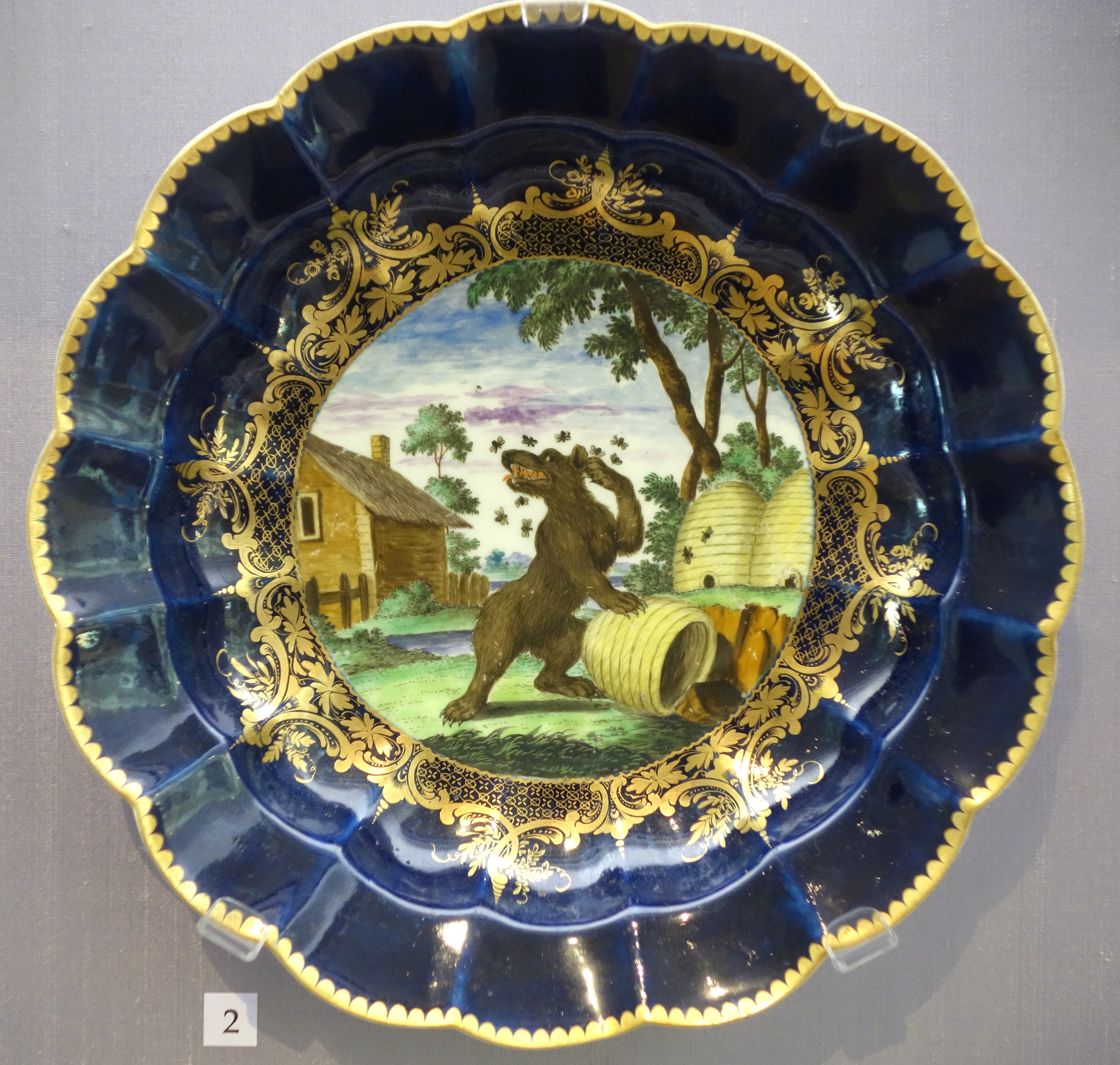
Plate, fable of Bear and Beehives, Worcester, painted by O'Neal c. 1770

O'Neal was born in 1734, possibly the son of a landowner in County Antrim. His name is occasionally spelt O'Neil. The lack of detail known on his life has been attributed to his "retiring personality and elusiveness". He practised for many years in London as a miniature-painter, and exhibited occasionally with the Incorporated Society of Artists, of which he was a member, being one of the artists who signed the declaration roll in 1766. O'Neal is also stated to have painted landscapes and natural history. He produced ‘Japan’ pieces for a printseller, Smith, in Cheapside.

O'Neal also painted pottery, known as Chelsea porcelain, for a factory in Worcester, living there between 1767 and 1768 and returning to London in March 1770. However, some historians have questioned his direct employment at a Worcester factory, as such painters were generally not allowed to sign their work. This work was described as "incorrect but very charming figure, animal and landscape subjects." He primarily known for painting scenes from Fables of Aesop by Samuel Croxall during the 1750s. From 1750 to 1766, he appears to have lived at the same address as Thomas Bryand, one of the first manufacturers of porcelain in England.

By the 1760s, O'Neal was designing pattern book sheets for Robert Sayer, Fleet Street. Sayer credited O'Neal on his work, indicating that he was well-known. He created numerous satirical prints with Sayer and others about events such as the resignation of John Stuart, 3rd Earl of Bute, in 1763.

In 1772 he was living in Lawrence Street, Chelsea. George Augustus Walpole described him as "the most capital painter in Ireland" in 1784. He died in 1801.
