= Itzelberger Lake =

Lake in Königsbronn, Baden-Württemberg, Germany

Lake Itzelberg
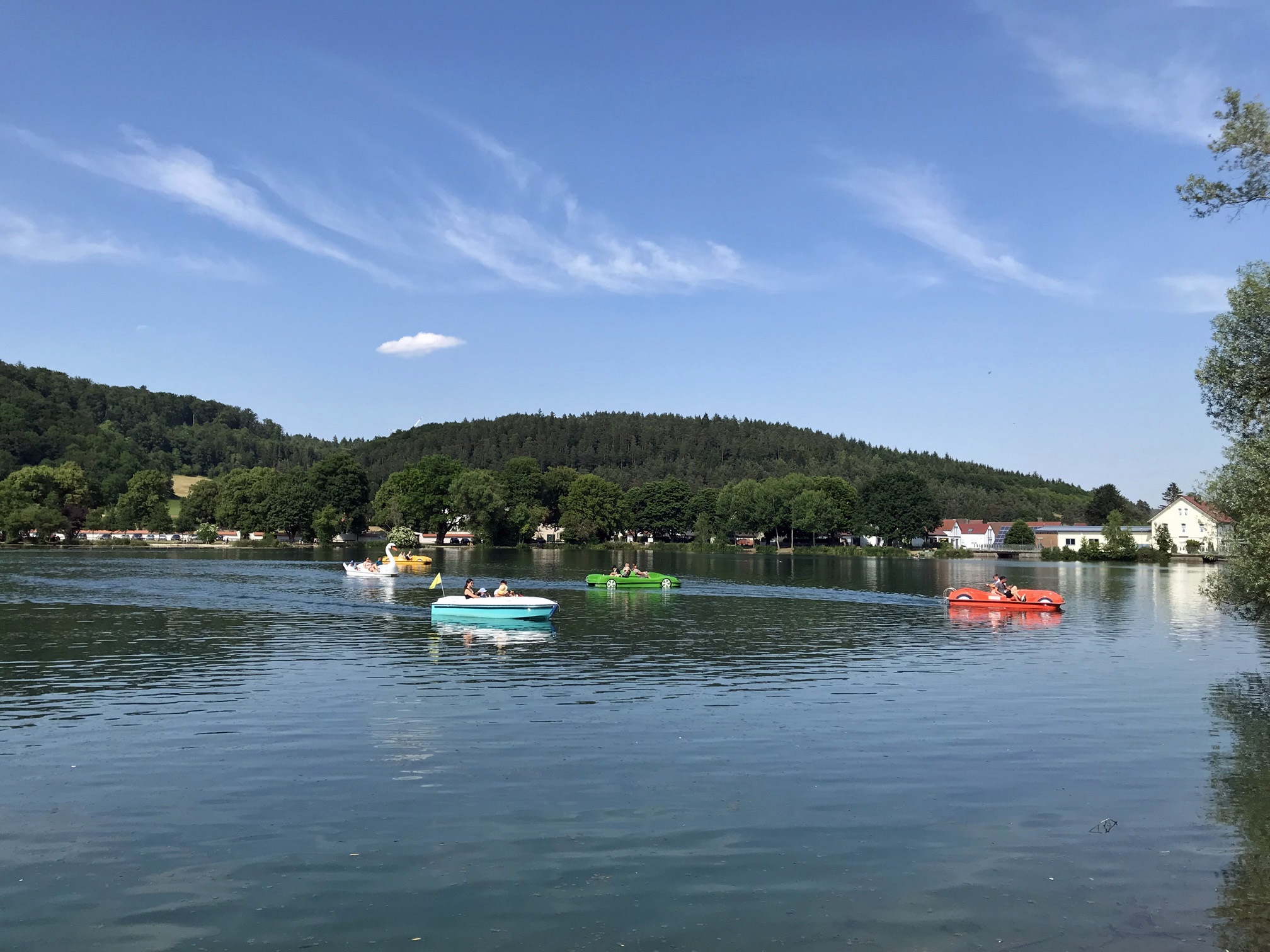
- Lake Itzelberg
- Interactive map of Lake Itzelberg
- Location: Baden-Württemberg
- Coordinates: 48.732472°N 10.133528°E
- Type: Lake
- Primary inflows: Brenz
- Primary outflows: Brenz, Danube, Black Sea
- Surface area: 8.4 hectares (21 acres)
- Max. depth: 3 m (9.8 ft)
- Surface elevation: 495.6 m (1,626 ft)
- Settlements: Königsbronn

Lake Itzelberg is located near Itzelberg, a district of the municipality of Königsbronn in the Heidenheim district, at the eastern end of the Swabian Alb in eastern Baden-Württemberg.

== Geography ==
The lake was created by damming the Brenz, which rises 1.2 kilometres upstream in the Brenztopf. At the inlet of the Brenz, there is a wetland biotope with a bird protection island. A circular hiking trail leads around the lake. Lake Itzelberg is designated as station no. 2 on the Königsbronn route of the Karst Spring Trail.

== History ==
Lake Itzelberg was likely dammed in the 14th century by the Cistercian monks from the former Königsbronn Monastery. The dam was constructed to harness water power effectively and facilitate fish farming. Between 1471 and 1479, the monks built an iron forge at the site.

After its destruction in the Thirty Years' War, reconstruction began in 1696. The operation included a hammer forge with two lauter fires, a large hammer, a stretching and zain hammer, two coal barns, and a sawmill. Previously drained, the lake was refilled during this reconstruction.

A map from the Lake Atlas by J. A. Riediger in 1737–1738 shows a hammer forge at the lake’s outlet and a "shooting gallery" used for bird hunting. Until the 19th century, Itzelberg was closely linked with the ironworks in Königsbronn, until production facilities were relocated to the new main plant (today SHW Casting Technologies).

The main pumping station of the Härtsfeld-Albuch Water Supply Association, located at the lake’s outlet, was built in 1892. The station pumps water from three deep wells in the Brenzaue between Königsbronn and Itzelberg. The karst water is transported to the plateaus of Härtsfeld and Albuch using a turbine powered by hydropower from the lake, supplying over 25,000 inhabitants with up to 5,000 m³ of drinking water per day. A cast-iron fountain, restored in 1991, commemorates the communities that founded the association in 1890. The waterworks is designated as station number 3 on the Königsbronn route of the Karst Spring Trail.

To the north of the lake lies a quarry where White Jurassic limestone was once mined. In this quarry, resistance fighter Georg Elser stole dynamite for his failed bomb attack on Adolf Hitler in 1939.

== Protected landscape area ==
In 1957, the lake was desilted, as a two-metre-thick layer of mud had accumulated, leaving water only 30 centimetres deep in some areas. Over 170,000 m³ of sludge was removed from the lake basin, and large parts of the swamp meadows were filled with the dredged mud. A two-hectare remnant of the former moor remained, from which the bird sanctuary island was created as a breeding and retreat area for birds and amphibians.

Since 1978, Lake Itzelberg has been a landscape conservation area. Species include kingfishers, mallards, tufted ducks, moorhens, mute swans, coots, Canada goose, and grey herons. In the winter months, pochards, red-crested pochards, and gulls, among others, rest on the lake before migrating to their breeding grounds in spring.

The lake is rich in fish, hosting several Central European species, including eel, grayling, brown trout, brook trout, bream, chub, pike, carp, rainbow trout, and rudd.

Since the boat and raft rental service began in 2012, a floating barrier has separated the tourist area of the lake from the bird sanctuary island.

== Recreational area ==
Lake Itzelberg is not used for bathing. Boat and raft rentals, a mini-golf course, and a pit-pat facility on the south shore operate from March to October. A restaurant and a children’s playground on the south shore are open year-round.

As a fishing location, the lake is managed by the Baden-Württemberg State Fisheries Association.

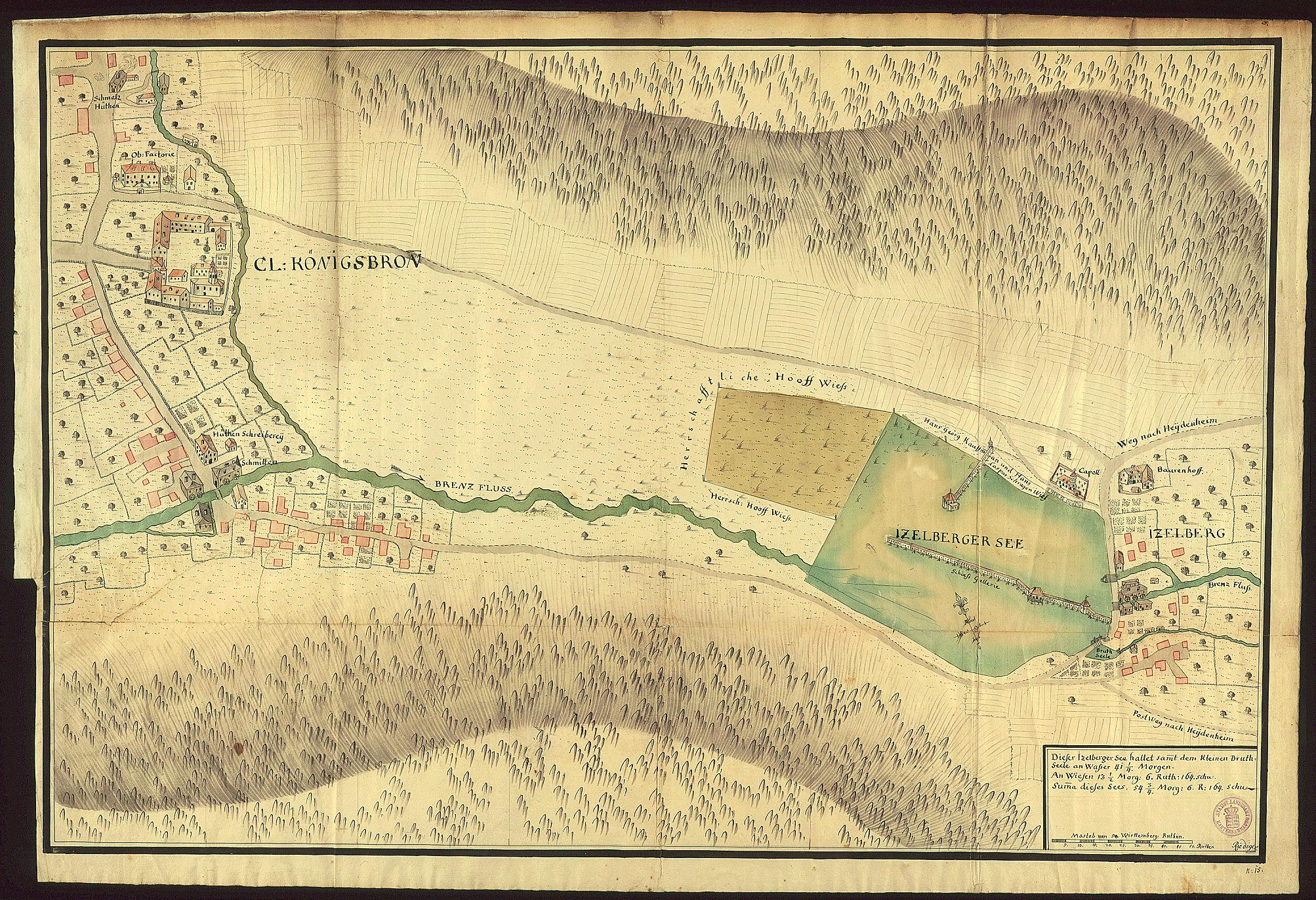
Lake Itzelberg in the lake atlas of J. A. Riediger 1737-38

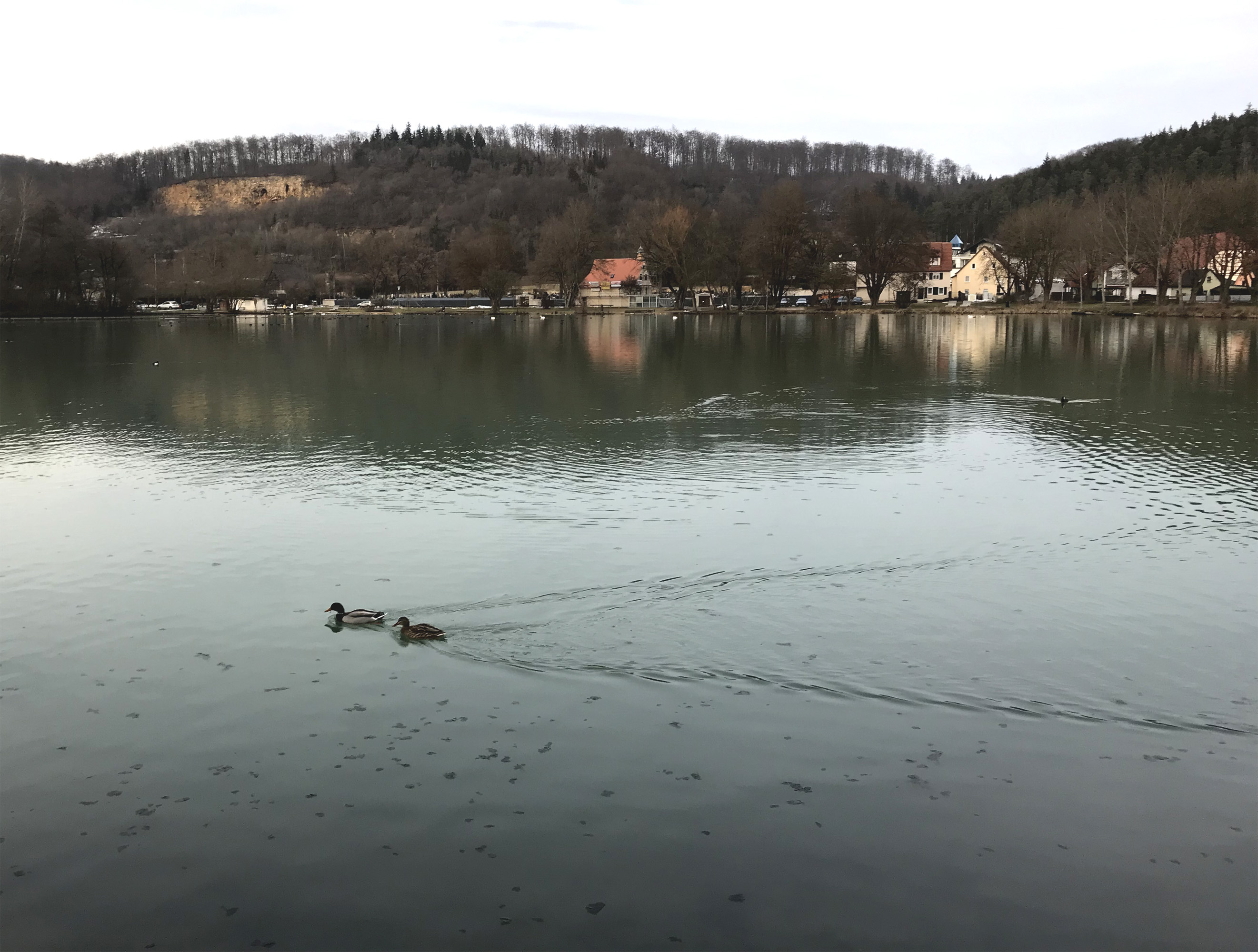
View of the north bank with quarry in the background

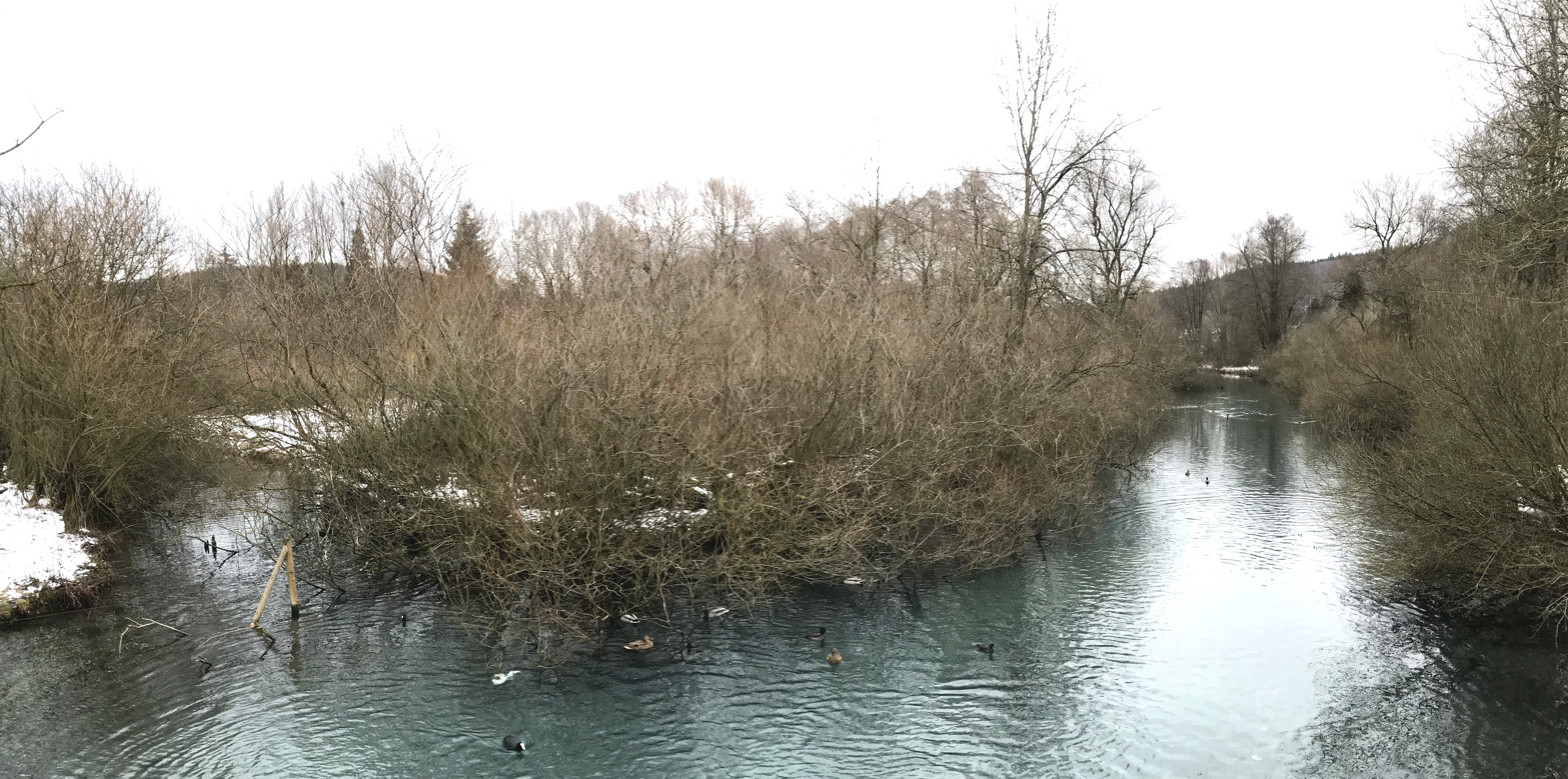
Western tip of the bird sanctuary island at the inlet of the Brenz

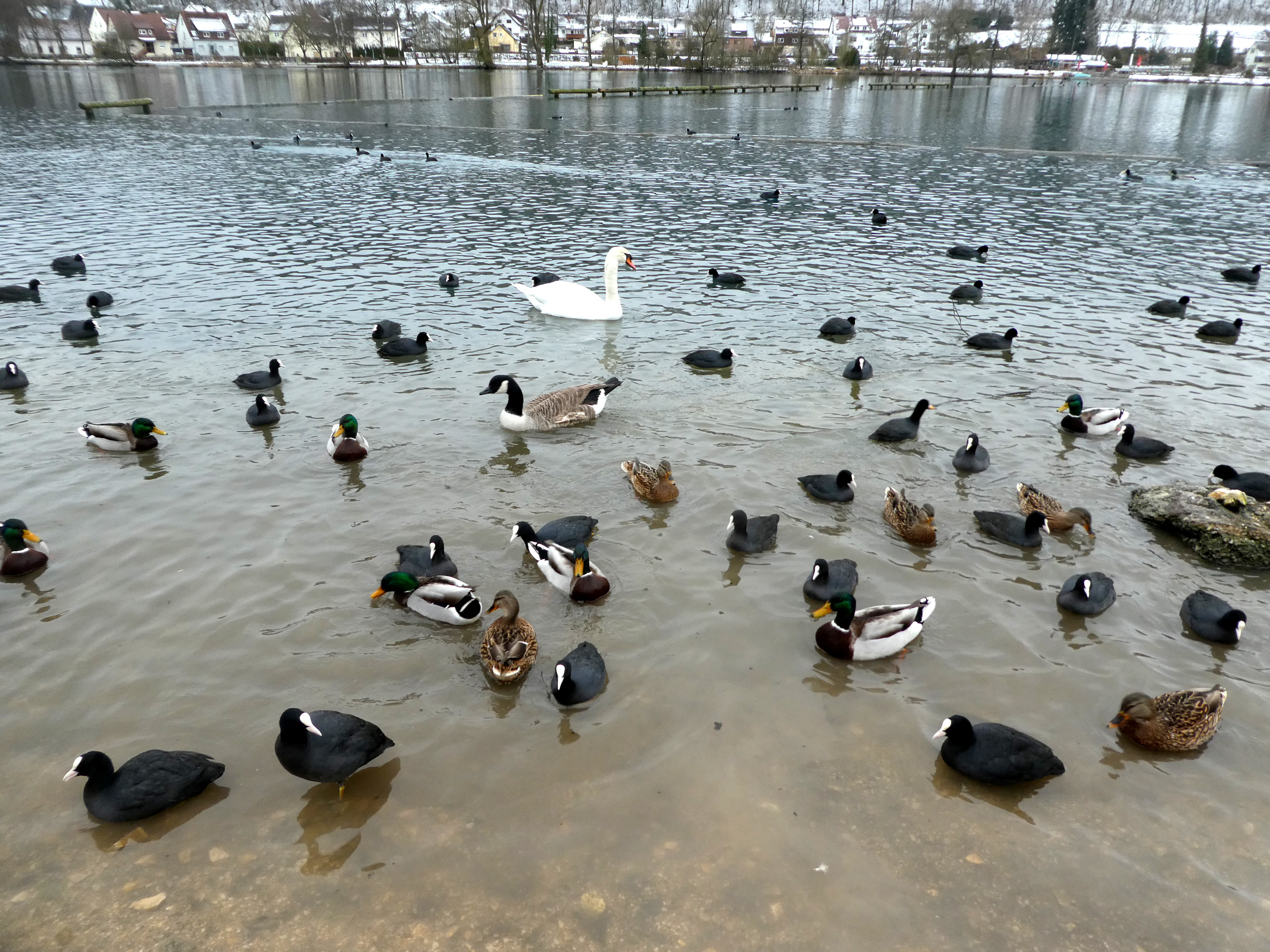
Waterbirds on the north bank

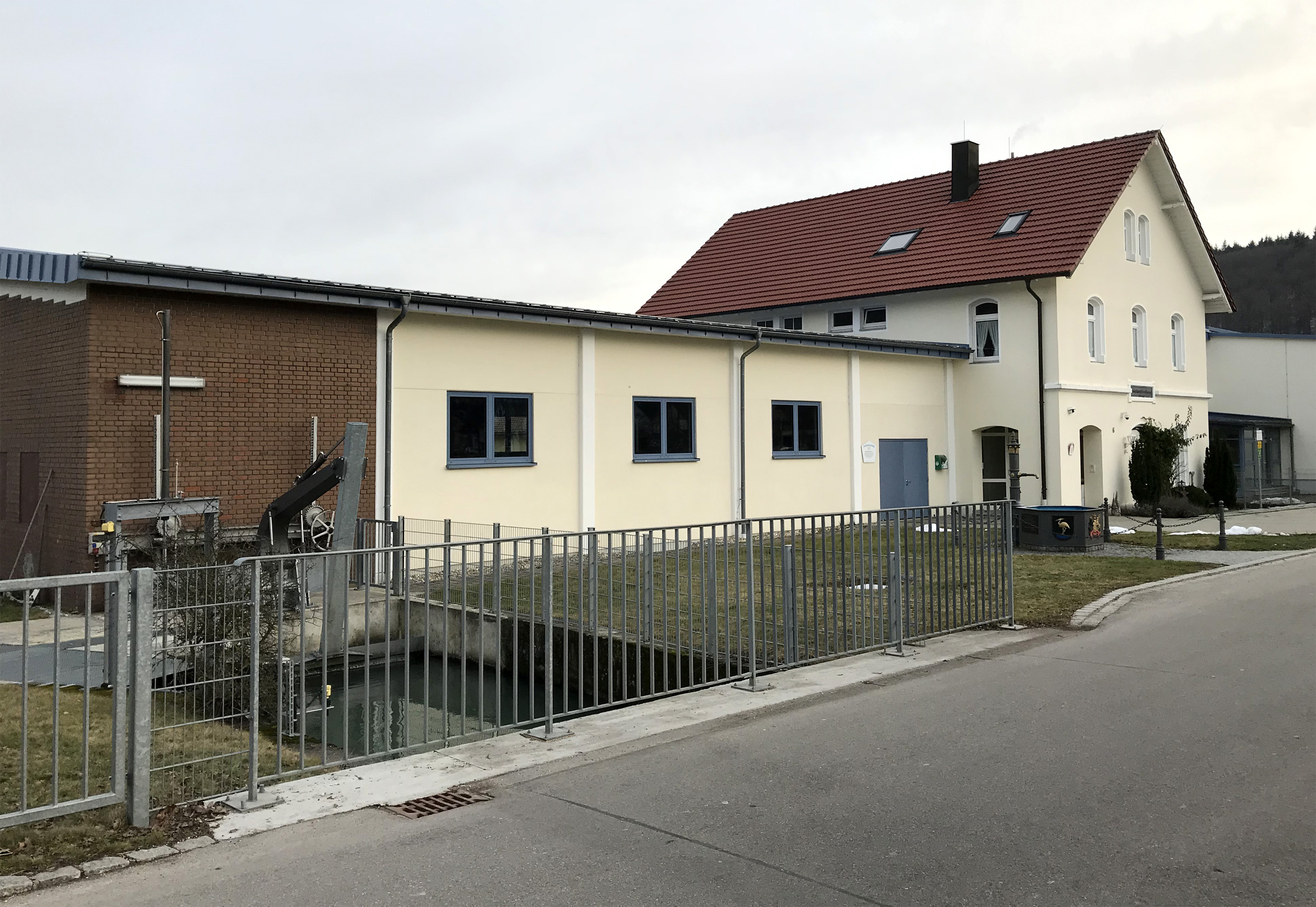
Waterworks of the Härtsfeld-Albuch water supply on the east bank
