= Daniel Maichel =

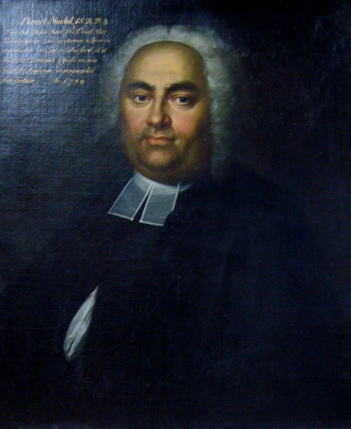
Daniel Maichel

Daniel Maichel (14 August 1693 – 20 January 1752) was a German professor of philosophy, theology, logic, physics, rights and politics. He studied protestant theology in Tübingen and earned a master's degree in 1713. Maichel was born in Stuttgart and died in Königsbronn.

He was in touch with Pierre des Maizeaux and visited him in London at the Rainbow Coffee House. He wrote to des Maiseaux "‘in the hope I have that you will still be an illustrious member of that learned Society which meets every evening at the Rainbow Café".
