= Barnaby Bernard Lintot =

17th/18th-century English publisher

Barnaby Bernard Lintot ("Lintott" before 1724, usually referred to as "Bernard" and very rarely as "Bernaby") (1 December 1675 – 9 February 1736), was an English publisher who started business in London about 1698. Born at Southwater, Sussex, Lintot was apprenticed to a bookseller in 1690 and was not officially freed of his contract until 1700, but he began selling books independently at the sign of the Cross Keys in St. Martin's Lane before that, and six plays appeared with his imprint in 1698.

By concentrating his stock primarily on literary authors, Lintot was a rival of Jacob Tonson's. In 1700, he married Catherine Langley, a widow, and moved his shop to Fleet Street at the Post House. In 1705, he moved his shop again, to its most permanent location, at the Cross Keys on Fleet Street, next to Nando's Coffee House and right by Temple Bar. From 1705 to 1712, he published all the plays put on at Theatre Royal, Drury Lane, and he was one of the leading publishers of literary authors, including the dramas of George Farquhar, John Dryden, William Congreve, Richard Steele, Susanna Centlivre, and Colley Cibber.

Lintot went into semi-retirement in 1730. From that point on, his son, Henry Lintot, ran the publishing business with him, and Lintot moved out to Sussex. During his career, Bernard purchased lands adjoining his father's lands every time he had occasion, and so he had moderate estates by the time he gave his son a role in the business. In 1735, he was High Sheriff of Sussex; he died of "an asthma" in February 1736.

== Publications ==
As a publisher, Lintott focused on works of literature, but he also published legal guides, the literary criticism of John Dennis, and the philosophical works of noted deists. He also increased the pay that he gave to authors who had proven successful and occasionally speculated on contemporary furores. He paid, for example, £105 to Colley Cibber for The Nonjuror and over £100 to John Gay for Poems on Several Occasions (after offering only £35 for Trivia). However, he also paid £130 to James Moore Smythe for The Rival Modes, primarily because of the disagreement Smythe had had with Pope.

In 1712, Lintott attempted to set up his own Miscellany series to counter Tonson's Poetical Miscellanies, which had been edited by Dryden, and so he got Alexander Pope to assemble Miscellaneous Poems and Translations. This volume contained the first version of Pope's The Rape of the Lock. Pope became a friend and author for Lintott, and many of Pope's friends began to sell their works to Lintott as well. John Gay and Nicholas Rowe, in particular, became clients of Lintott's, and Lintott published Pope's Works of 1717, Gay's Poems on Several Occasions in 1720, and Rowe's Works in 1728. Despite the early rivalry, in 1718, Lintott made an arrangement with Jacob Tonson that the two publishers would share in any future plays either house printed, and throughout his career Lintott established multiple publishing agreements with his rivals.

Lintott was the first to publish a catalogue of his holdings in 1714, with The Monthly Catalogue. He also, according to Pope, performed an early version of peer review. When he had a translation that he had purchased, he would send it out to "gentlemen" to assess its accuracy before he published it. From 1714 to 1727, he was one of the primary printers to the House of Commons.

In 1725, Pope and Lintot had a significant and complex quarrel. Lintott had paid Pope £2,201 for his translation of Homer's Iliad. Because of piracy and miscalculations, Lintott had not recouped the profit he anticipated. Thus, when Pope came to publish his translation of Odyssey, Lintot was in no mood to offer the same terms. Pope therefore went to Jacob Tonson. He offered to do an edition of Shakespeare for only £100 if Tonson would offer very good terms on Odyssey. Tonson, however, had arrangements with Lintot and declined to offer a better deal, and so Pope received only £337 from Lintot for the translation. Tonson, for his part, went ahead and advertised the new Shakespeare edition by Pope, and this infuriated Lintot, who complained in print. Pope quit Lintot at that point.

== In popular culture ==
Between 1725 and 1727, Pope referred to Lintot twice in his works. In the Narrative of Dr. Norris, Lintot is satirised lightly, and in the Full and True Account of the "poisoning" of Edmund Curll he is struck a bit more directly. However, in The Dunciad, Pope took full revenge. Satirised for being foolish enough to compete in a race for the "Phantom More" (James Moore Smythe), Lintot is given a memorable description as a "dabchick" waddling along the street (Lintot was a very large and clumsy man, according to contemporaries, with a tendency to "sputter" and to resort to exasperated profanity):

"As when a dab-chick waddles thro' the copse,
On feet and wings, and flies, and wades, and hops;
So lab'ring on, with shoulders, hands, and head,
Wide as a windmill all his figure spread . . .
Full in the middle way there stood a lake,
Which Curl's Corinna chanc'd that morn to make,
(Such was her wont, at early down to drop
Her evening cates before his neighbour's shop,)
Here fortun'd Curl to slide; loud shout the band,
And Bernard! Bernard! rings thro' all the Strand." (II 59–70)
