= Pfeffer (Brenz) =

River in Germany

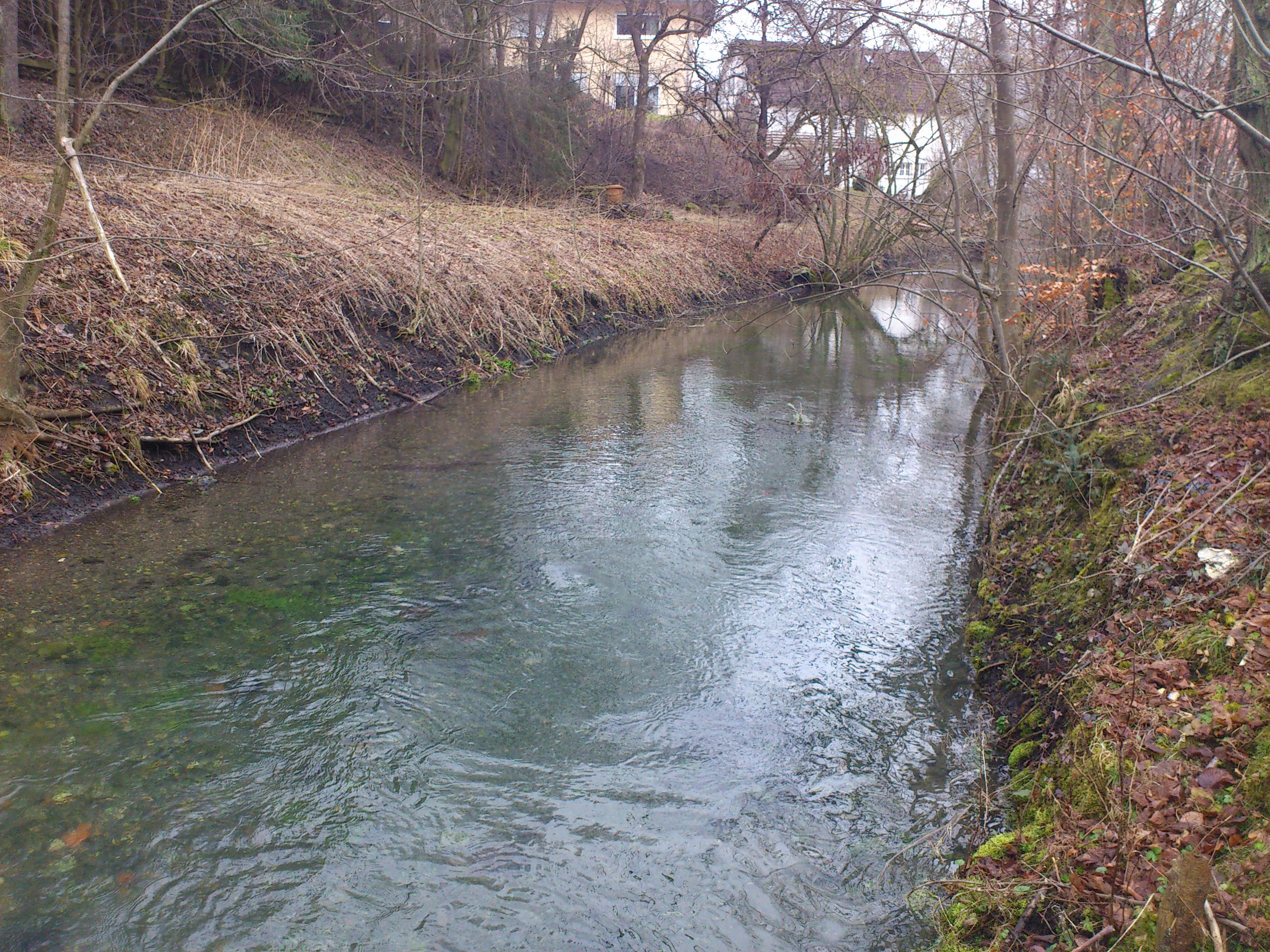
- Pfeffer close to the spring

Location
- Country: Germany
- State: Baden-Württemberg

Physical characteristics
- Mouth
  - location: Brenz
  - coordinates: 48.7375°N 10.1169°E
- Length: 450 m (1,480 ft)

Basin features
- Progression: Brenz→ Danube→ Black Sea

Pfeffer is a short river of Baden-Württemberg, Germany. It is a left tributary of the Brenz at the Königsbronn Abbey.

== See also ==
- List of rivers of Baden-Württemberg
