= Ochsenberg =

Ochsenberg may refer to:

- Ochsenberg (Königsbronn), a village of Königsbronn in Heidenheim, Baden-Württemberg, Germany
- Ochsenberg (Swabian Jura), a mountain in Baden-Württemberg, Germany

== See also ==
- Ochlenberg, a municipality in Bern, Switzerland
