= Pfeffer (disambiguation) =

Pfeffer is a German surname.

Pfeffer may also refer to:

- Pfeffer (grape), a grape variety
- Bid Euchre variant Pfeffer, a card game
- Pfeffer (Brenz), a river of Baden-Württemberg, Germany, tributary of the Brenz

== See also ==
- Pfeffer integral, in mathematics
- International Pfeffer Peace Award
