= Ochsenberg (Königsbronn) =

- Village of Königsbronn
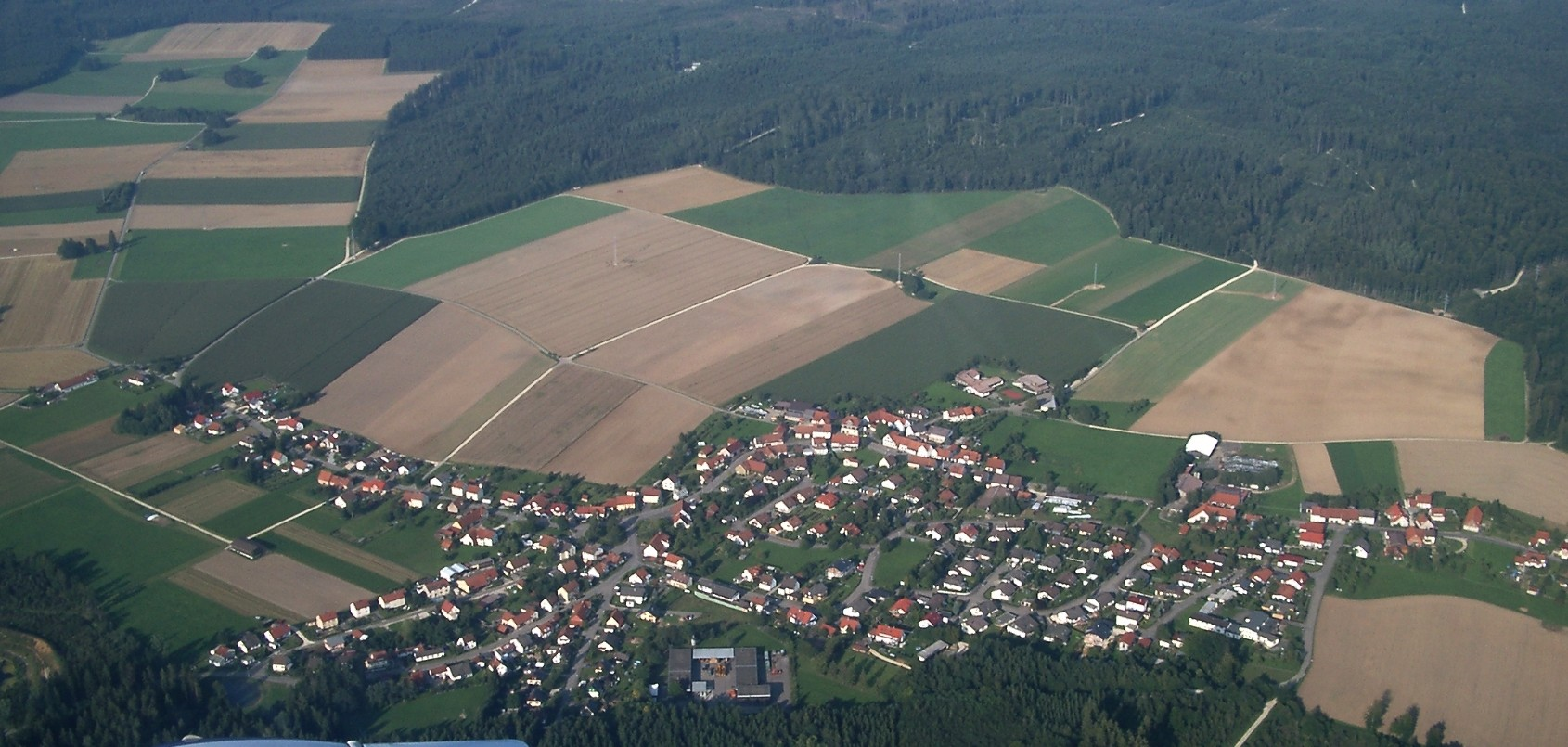
- Aerial photo 2005 (top left the land parcel Falchen)

- Coat of arms
- Interactive map of Ochsenberg
- Location within Germany Location within Baden-Württemberg
- Coordinates: 48°44′54″N 10°8′29″E
- Country: Germany
- State: Baden-Württemberg
- Admin. region: Stuttgart
- District: Heidenheim
- Town: Königsbronn
- First mentioned: 1538

Area
  - Total: 5.89 km^{2} (2.27 sq mi)
- Elevation: 617 m (2,024 ft)

Population (2024-12-31)
  - Total: 660
  - Density: 110/km^{2} (290/sq mi)
- Time zone: UTC+01:00 (CET)
  - Summer (DST): UTC+02:00 (CEST)
- Postal codes: 89551
- Dialling codes: 07328
- Vehicle registration: HDH

The village of Ochsenberg (German pronunciation: [ˈɔksn̩ˌbɛʁk]) is part of the municipality of Königsbronn in the district of Heidenheim in Baden-Württemberg, Germany.

== Geography ==
=== Situation ===
Ochsenberg is situated in the eastern part of the Swabian Jura, on the western edge of the Härtsfeld plateau at an altitude of 617 m above sea level (town hall).

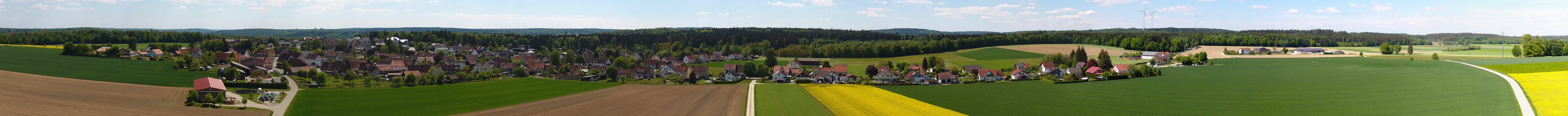
View towards the south - west - north (17 May 2020)

=== Space allocation ===
According to data from the book Der Landkreis Heidenheim, Band II, 2000.

=== Climate ===
Climate data for Ochsenberg (1991–2021)
Month	Jan	Feb	Mar	Apr	May	Jun	Jul	Aug	Sep	Oct	Nov	Dec	Year
Mean daily maximum °C (°F)	2.4 (36.3)	3.7 (38.7)	8.3 (46.9)	13.2 (55.8)	17.0 (62.6)	20.5 (68.9)	22.3 (72.1)	22.1 (71.8)	17.8 (64.0)	13.2 (55.8)	7.0 (44.6)	3.4 (38.1)	12.6 (54.7)
Daily mean °C (°F)	−0.6 (30.9)	−0.2 (31.6)	3.8 (38.8)	8.4 (47.1)	12.6 (54.7)	16.2 (61.2)	17.9 (64.2)	17.6 (63.7)	13.5 (56.3)	9.2 (48.6)	3.9 (39.0)	0.6 (33.1)	8.6 (47.5)
Mean daily minimum °C (°F)	−3.6 (25.5)	−3.8 (25.2)	−0.5 (31.1)	3.4 (38.1)	7.8 (46.0)	11.3 (52.3)	13.2 (55.8)	13.1 (55.6)	9.5 (49.1)	5.6 (42.1)	1.1 (34.0)	−1.9 (28.6)	4.5 (40.1)
Average precipitation mm (inches)	71 (2.8)	56 (2.2)	72 (2.8)	65 (2.6)	97 (3.8)	93 (3.7)	99 (3.9)	87 (3.4)	72 (2.8)	70 (2.8)	73 (2.9)	76 (3.0)	931 (36.7)
Average precipitation days (≥ 1.0 mm)	9	8	10	9	11	11	11	10	9	9	9	11	117
Average relative humidity (%)	83	81	75	68	71	69	68	69	75	81	86	84	76
Mean daily sunshine hours	3.2	4.2	5.9	8.3	9.2	10.6	10.8	9.8	6.9	4.9	3.4	3.2	6.7
Source: de.climate-data.org

== History ==
=== General ===
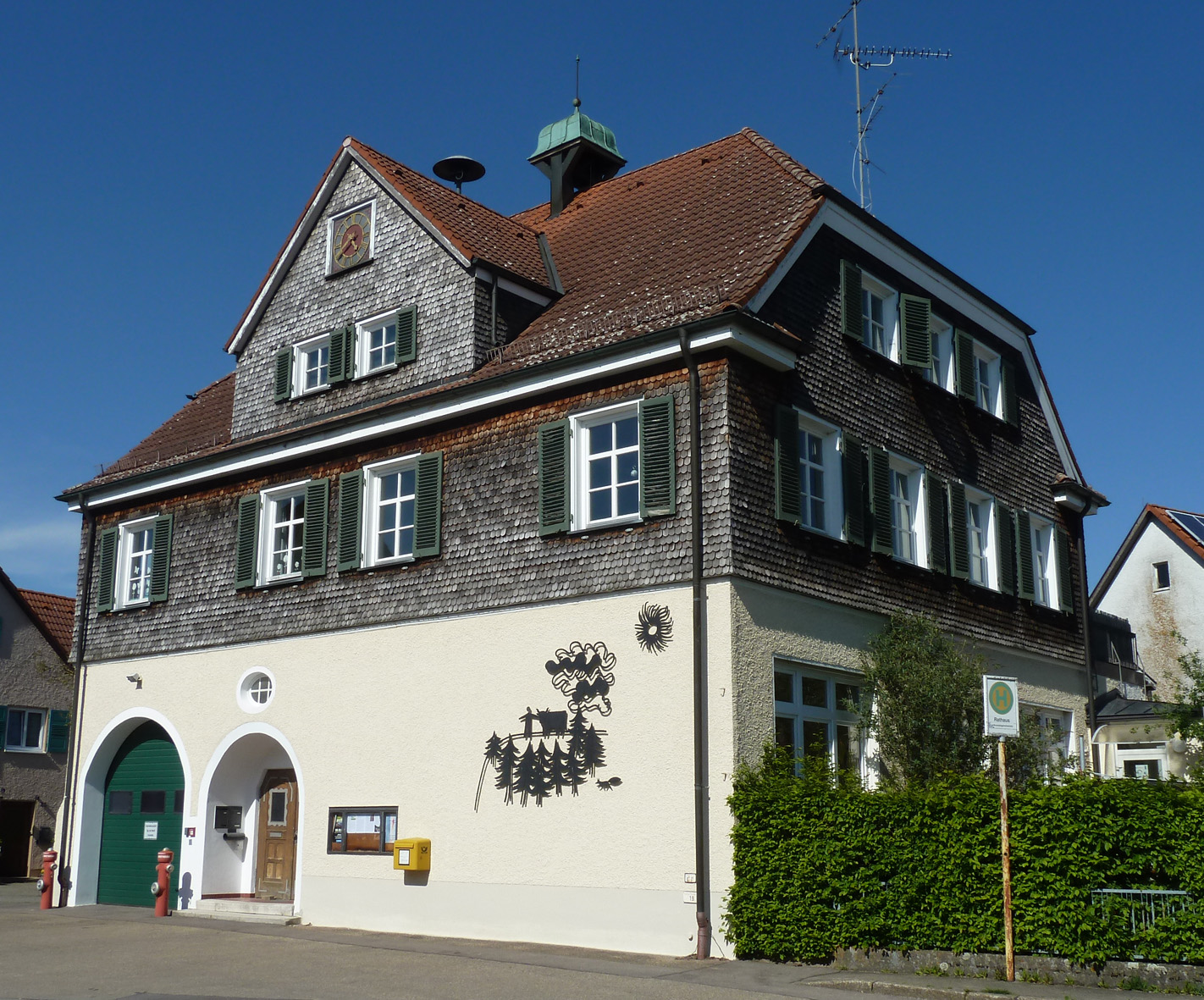
Town hall

The first documentary evidence dates back to 1538. Years before the abbot Melchior Ruff, who was active in the Königsbronn Abbey, had already settled woodworkers, charcoal burners and day labourers on a clearing in today's hamlet. The village name originates from the "oxen (Ochsen) pasture for the abbey, up on the mountain (Berg)." 1572 Ochsenberg was annexed to Königsbronn.

In the tax audit protocol of 1733 is written: "All the buildings in this hamlet are the very least in the whole monastery office, none of them is built of bricks and all of which are covered with straw".

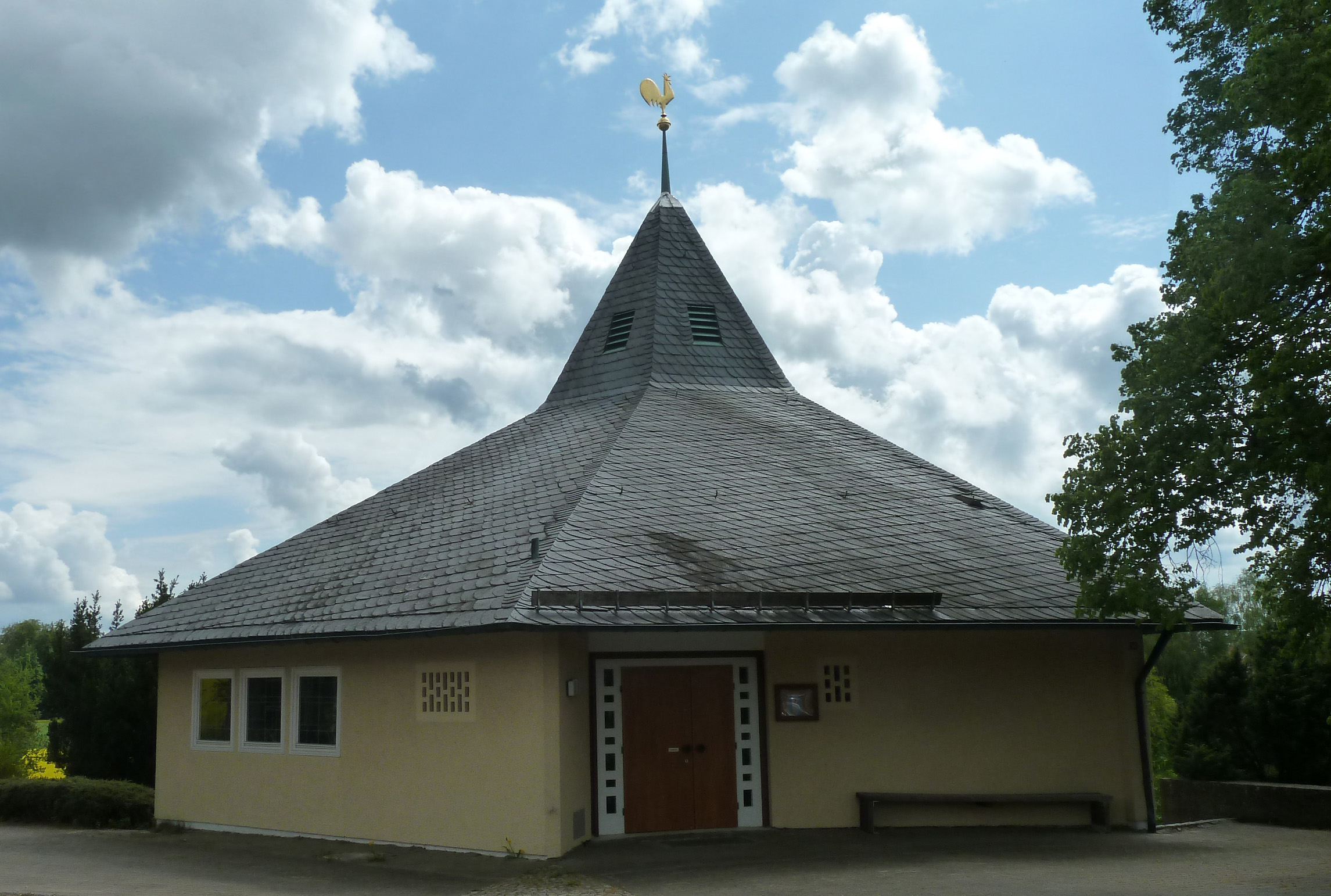
Johanneskirche (church of St. John)

Around 1800, the houses were still not made of bricks and were only covered with straw, and the water was only sparsely available from ponds or vats. In 1817 a major fire destroyed ten houses completely. 1849 Ochsenberg became an independent municipality. With the commissioning of the Härtsfeld water pipe on 11 November 1891 Ochsenberg receives a permanent drinking water supply from the wells in Itzelberg.

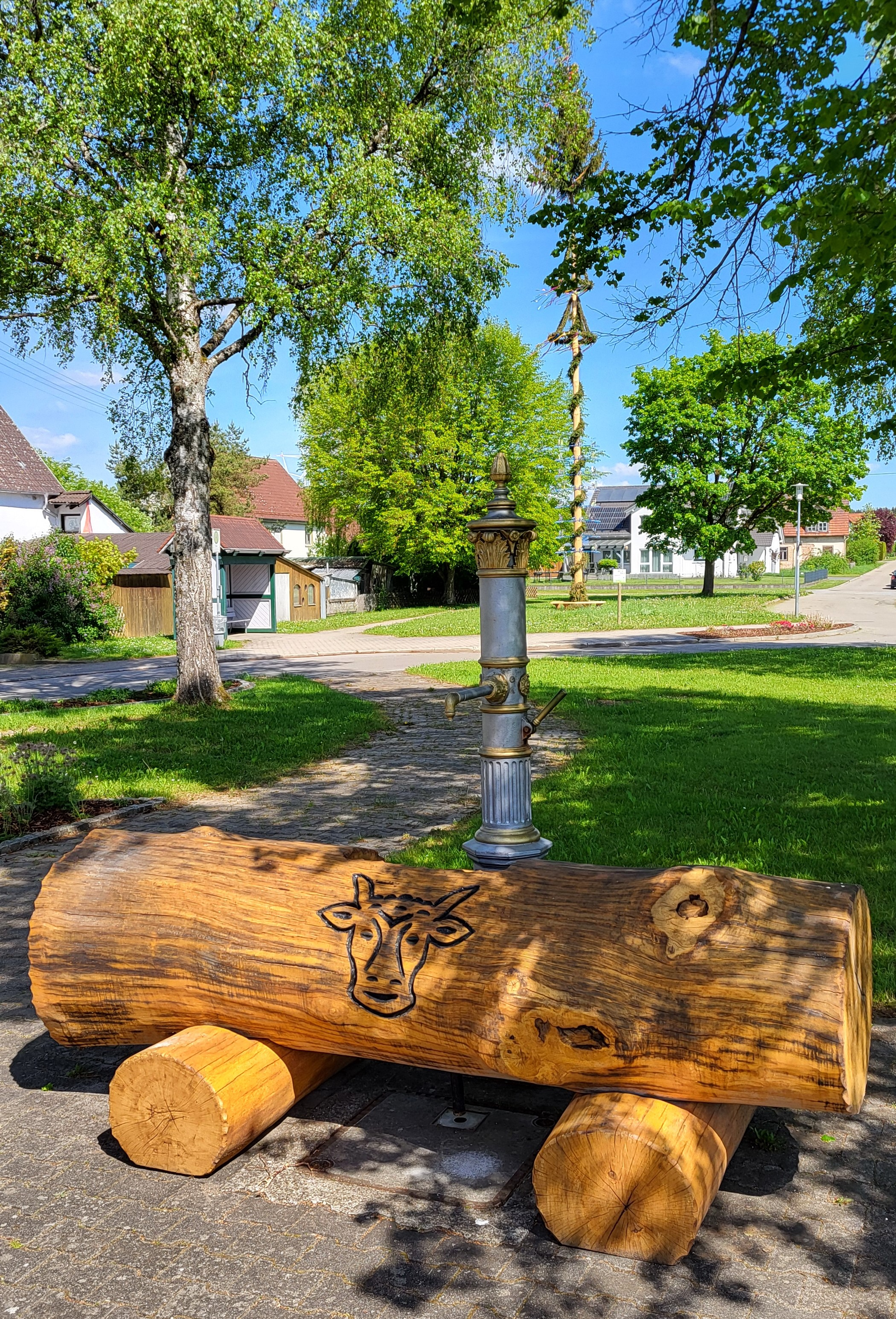
Lindenplatz (linden square) with fountain, in the background the maypole

In 1910 the construction of today's town hall took place, which also serves as a schoolhouse and fire brigade depot. The supply of electrical power is ensured by UJAG (Ueberlandwerk Jagstkreis) from 1917 onwards. The forester Wilhelm Braun from Oberkochen was shot by poachers in the Falchen forest on 1 August 1926, a memorial stone commemorates the event.

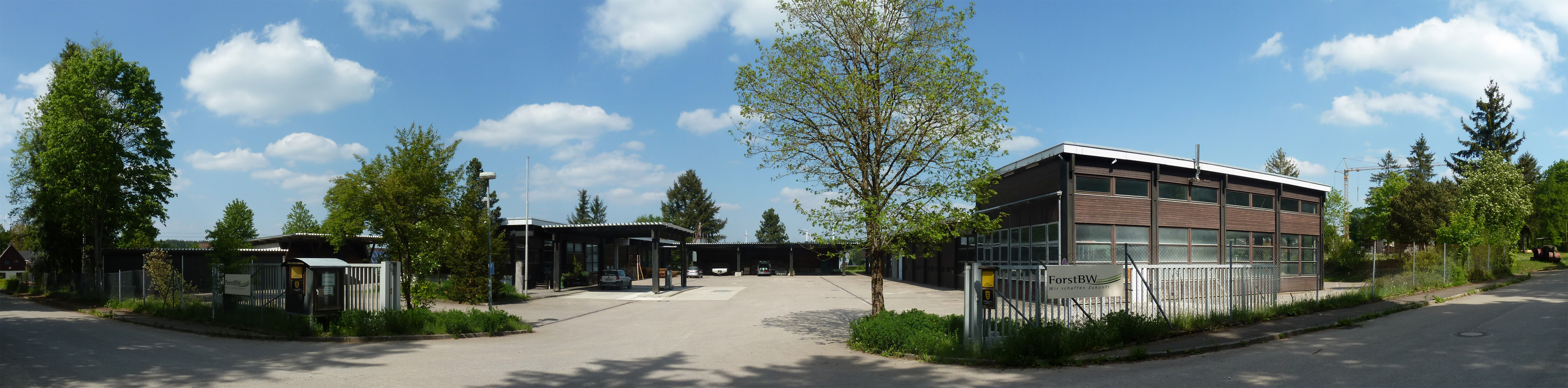
Staatliche Maschinenhof (state machinery yard)

Until 1963 the churchgoers had to walk to Königsbronn, as the Kirchenweg (church path) still bears witness to today. On 23 June of the same year, after 2 years of construction, the Johanneskirche (church of St. John) was consecrated by pastor Traugott Scheytt, the church windows were designed by Hans Bäurle. On 1 February 1972 Ochsenberg is incorporated into Königsbronn. With the age-related felling of the 175-year-old linden tree on 9 May 1974, the redesign of the Lindenplatz (linden square) began. In 1976 the village receives the collective connection to the sewage treatment plant in Itzelberg. The Staatliche Maschinenhof (state machinery yard), which was relocated from Königsbronn, was inaugurated on 20 May 1977. The newly built gym and multipurpose hall is ceremonially opened on 31 March 1979. In 1988 they celebrated 450 years of Ochsenberg.

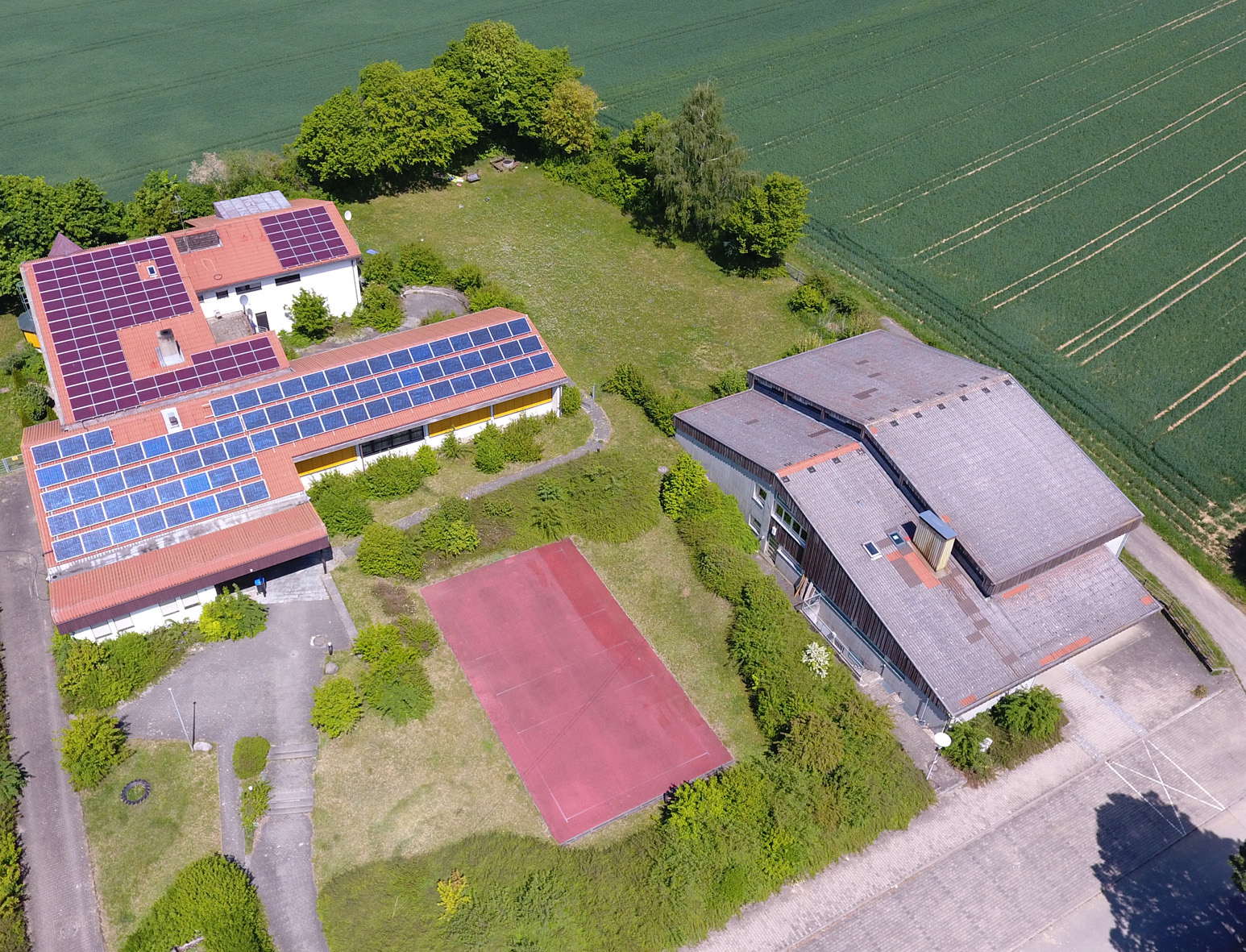
Protestant recreational home, gym and multipurpose hall

=== School, Protestant recreational home ===
Initially the school lessons were held in private rooms. From 1910 school lessons were held in the newly built town hall and schoolhouse. In 1964 a new building was erected and the old classroom in the town hall was converted into a kindergarten. For 12 years one teacher taught the 1st to 4th primary class in one room at the same time. Since 1976 the children travel by bus to the school in Königsbronn.

In 1981 the school building, which had been unused until then, was rebuilt and extended into a Protestant recreational home with 53 beds.

Due to the low occupancy rate, the complex was rented to the district of Heidenheim from the end of 2015 until autumn 2018 and refugees were accommodated there. Since autumn 2018 the municipality of Königsbronn has rented the building and uses it as a subsequent accommodation.

=== Youth hostel ===
Planned as a motel at the beginning of the 1960s, the building was abandoned as a shell at the end of the 1960s. In the mid-1970s, the building was extended and converted into a youth hostel with 110 beds, which opened in 1977. On 31 October 2005 the hostel closed, in February 2014 it was demolished.

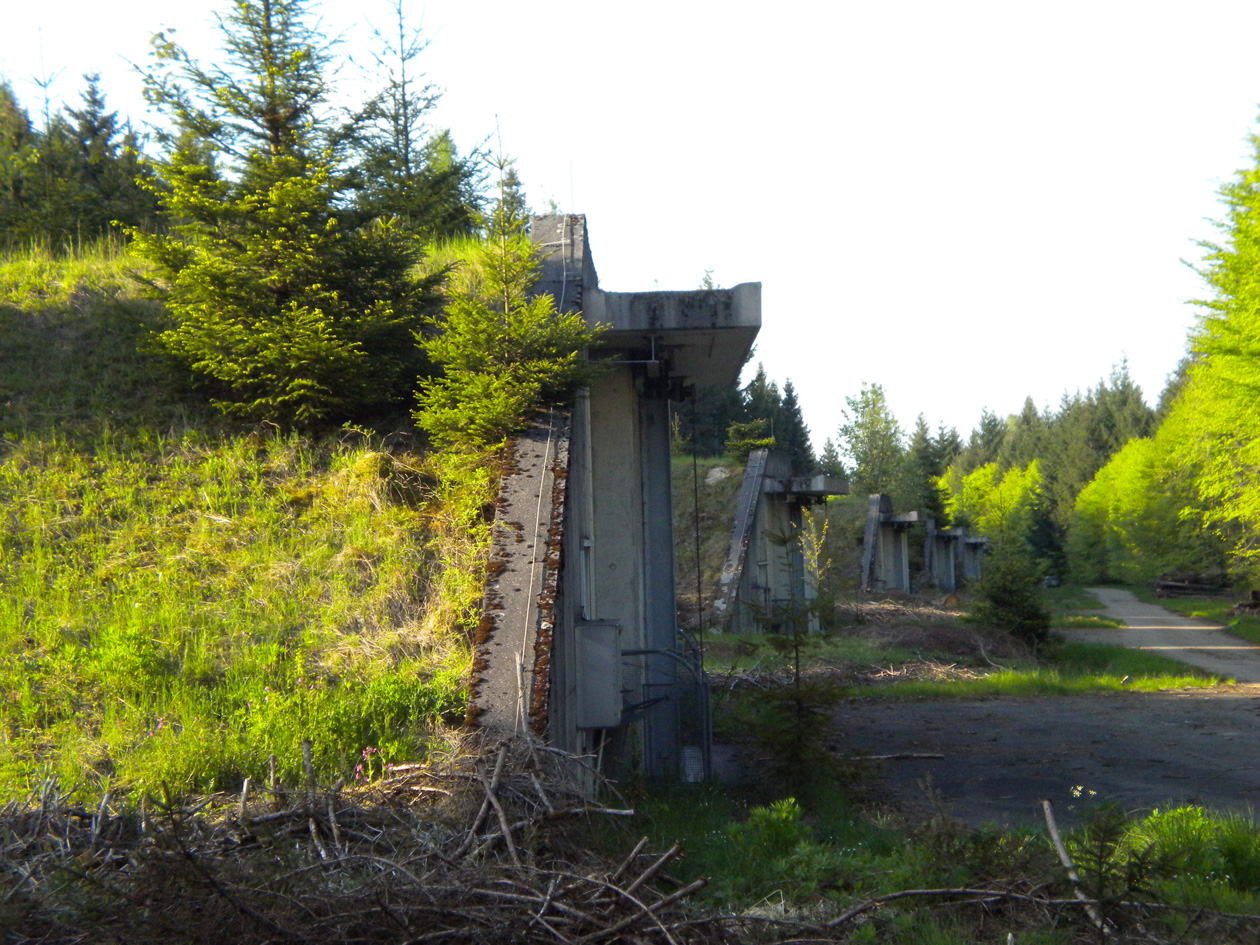
Ammunition depot 2010, bunkers ECM Stradley

=== Ammunition depot, solar park ===
For a planned ammunition depot of the Bundeswehr (Armed forces of Germany), a forest area east of the village was cleared in 1963. The construction of the 19-hectare site took place in 1964-65:

- Administrative district with guard/service building and technical area
- 11 concrete storage halls
- 29 larger and 8 smaller ECM (earth-covered magazine) Stradley ammunition storage facilities (bunkers)
- 2 small ammunition warehouses 25 m^{2} and 50 m^{2}

In December 1998 the ammunition depot closed, in 2010 the bunkers were demolished.

From February 2014, a solar park with 40,000 modules was built on the unused site, which will supply up to 3,000 households with electricity. The commissioning takes place in May.

=== Demographics ===
In 1538 there were 6 houses in the hamlet. At the beginning of the Thirty Years' War in 1618, 40 families lived in 24 houses, by 1648 it had been reduced to 10 houses with 8 families. By 1708 the village grew to 25 houses.

From the description of the district authority Heidenheim of 1844: "Hamlet with 51 thatched houses. Of the craftsmen, Ochsenberg has two potters, some weavers, and several bricklayers and carpenters who work journeymen in Königsbronn and Itzelberg. The economic conditions of the inhabitants, a very active, honest, but rather rough and coarse people, have improved noticeably by the lively haulage business, in which the transport of salt, peat, wood, iron, etc. is taken in piecework by local farmers."

World War I claims 11 dead and 6 missing soldiers, World War II 17 dead and 12 missing soldiers.

With the arrival and settlement of displaced persons after World War II, the number of inhabitants had increased noticeably.

Year	Population
1800	260
1801	250
1808	261
1810	263
1812	273
1824	288
1828	308
1831	320
1835	304
1839	329
1843	359
1844	357
1847	356
1852	318
1854	324

Year	Population
1858	324
1862	388
1866	382
1869	374
1871	347
1873	347
1877	341
1880	340
1890	335
1891	323
1900	313
1905	325
1910	340
1925	338
1933	301

Year	Population
1936	301
1939	291
1945	432
1950	448
1955	432
1956	437
1960	443
1961	451
1965	497
1969	523
1970	567
1972 ^{1}	572
1975	598
1979	650
1980	620

Year	Population
1987 ^{2}	642
1990	706
1995	720
1997	730
2001	722
2017	629
2018	631
2019	646
2020	645

^{1} Incorporation 1 February 1972

^{2} Population census 25 May 1987

Demographics with religious affiliation Einwohnerzahl = population Jahr = year Religion: ev = Protestant, rk = Roman Catholic, sonstige = misc. 1./2. Weltkrieg = World War 1/2

=== Religion ===
Until the end of World War II, Ochsenberg was Protestant. After that the number of Roman Catholic inhabitants increased considerably due to the displaced persons.

Year	Population	Pr.	RC
1831	320	313	7
1835	304	297	7
1839	329	322	7
1843	359	354	5
1844	357	353	4
1847	356	352	4
1854	324	315	9
1858	324	315	9
1862	388	387	1
1866	382	382	-

Year	Population	Pr. (%)	RC (%)	Misc. (%)
1869	374	373	1	-
1873	347	340	7	-
1877	341	334	7	-
1905	325	325	-	-
1925	338	338	-	-
1936	301	299 (99.3)	2 (0.7)	-
1950	448	347 (77.5)	100 (22.3)	1 (0.2)
1961	451	324 (71.8)	111 (24.6)	16 (3.5)
1970	567	370 (65.3)	165 (29.1)	32 (5.6)
2001	722	443 (61.4)	209 (28.9)	70 (9.7)

=== Associations ===
==== Choral society Liederlust Ochsenberg ====
At the end of 1920 the village teacher Wilhelm Heggenberger founded a girls’ choir. The conversion to a mixed choir took place on 14 January 1924 and choir is given the name Liederlust Ochsenberg. In 1931 there were 63 singers.

After World War II, the resumption of singing lessons began in October 1947 and in January 1948 the choir is newly founded. In 1994 the first performance of the children's choir took place. In the 75th anniversary year 1999 104 members were counted, 49 of them active singers.

==== Shooting club SSV Ochsenberg ====
Already in autumn 1928 11 men met with the idea to found the KK-Schützenverein 'Edelweiß' Ochsenberg. This takes place in 1929 and the practical shooting started in spring in the clay pit in the Falchen. In 1939 the club had 30 active members and 5 young shooters.

After World War II, shooting clubs were initially banned by the Allies. On 15 October 1954, an extraordinary meeting was held at the tavern Zur Linde to reestablish the club, and the name is changed to Sportschützenverein 'Edelweiß' Ochsenberg. At first a shooting room was provided in the Hirsch tavern, later there was also shooting in the private house of Heinz Elser. From 15 March 1957 on the shooting took place in the leased, municipality-owned barrack.

In 1979 the club had 115 members: 94 active shooters, 2 honorary members and 19 passive members. With the 60th anniversary in 1989 the new club flag is inaugurated, in 2004 they celebrated its 75th anniversary.

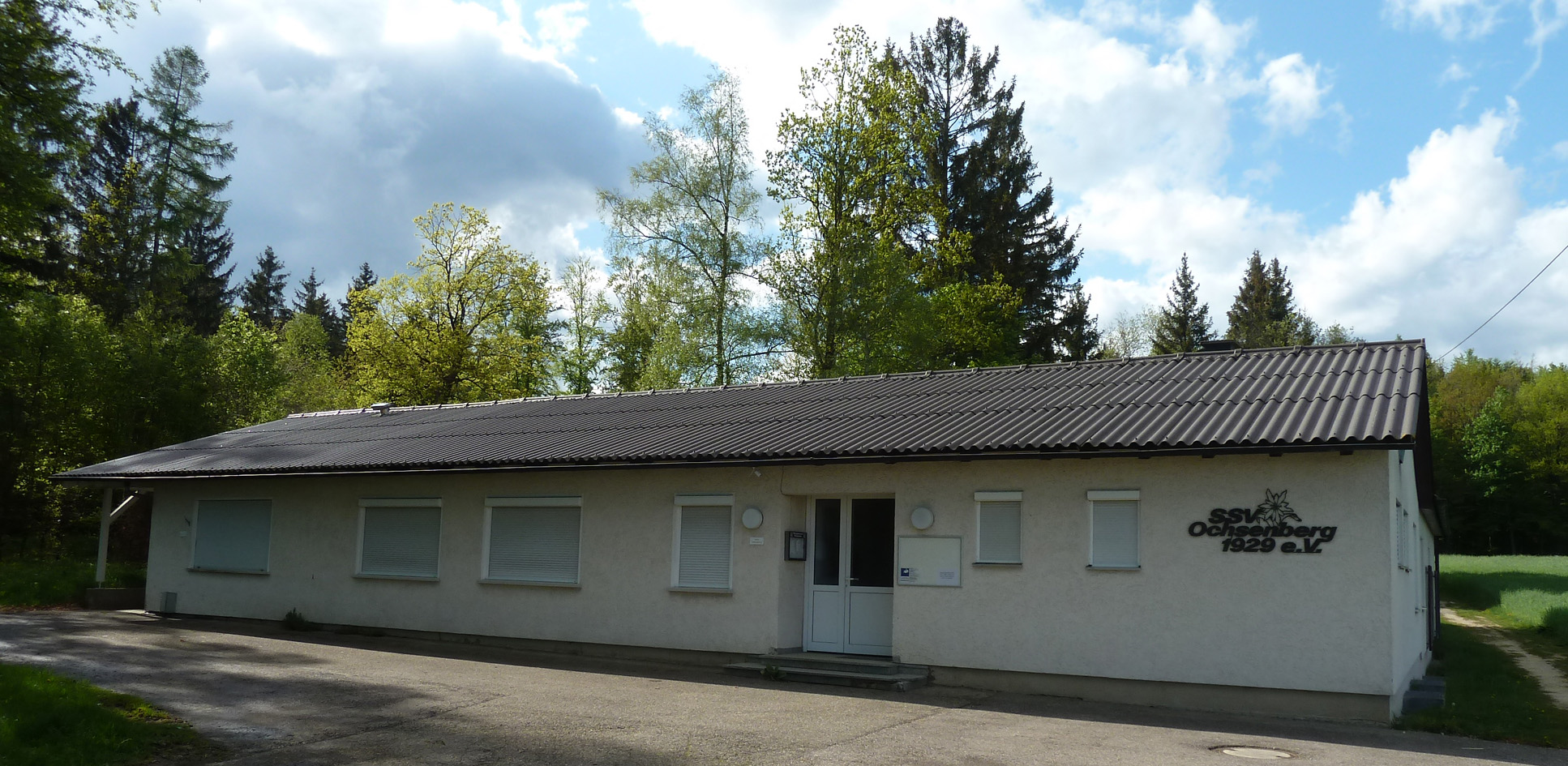
Club house

Clubhouse

From 29 July 1961 on the construction of the new clubhouse was started. After 6,000 hours of voluntary work, it is ceremonially opened on 26 October 1963. In 1972 the extension of the kitchen was built. 1988 a further extension took place (sanitary facilities, heating & evaluation room). In 1999 the clubhouse gets its present appearance by the extension of the new shooting hall.

=== Nickname ===
Steftsstecke is the historical nickname of the residents of Ochsenberg. A Steftsstecke is a strong and long stick (Stecken) equipped with an iron tip (Steft) at the lower end. People used this stick in many ways. It was useful for walking or climbing steep paths not only in winter, it also helped to push a sled. Often it was used to poke into or examine objects lying on the ground.

The advantage of the Steftstecke was proven by this historical narrative: Around 1820, Ochsenberger boys made their way to Ebnat for the church anniversary (religious festival). The bachelors from Ebnat were not happy about this, wanted to keep uninvited competition away from the dance floor and ran towards the Ochsenberg boys. The two groups already met at the boundary of the mark in the forest. After an exchange of words, a scuffle followed, which developed into a bloody quarrel. The Steftstecke they took with them proved to be a great advantage and the boys from Ochsenberg emerged as winners.

== Culture and sights ==
=== Associations, communities ===
- Liederlust Ochsenberg (choral society)
- Sportschützenverein Edelweiß (shooting club)
- Angelfreunde Ochsenberg e. V. (fishing friends), founded 2016
- Verein Waldarbeitsmeisterschaften (association of forest work championships), founded 1995 in Ochsenberg
- Voluntary fire brigade
- Red Cross community Königsbronn/Ochsenberg
- Maypole friends

=== Regular events ===
Date	Event	Location
First Saturday in January	Hiking tour shooting club SSV Ochsenberg	Start at Lindenplatz
30 April	Maypole erection	Lindenplatz
Last Saturday in June	Soccer game village youth – voluntary fire brigade	Playground (soccer field)
First Saturday in July and following Sunday	Children and forest festival	Playground
First Saturday in August and following Sunday	Summer night and forest festival with campfire	Club house of shooting club SSV Ochsenberg
Saturday before the 1st Advent	Christmas market	Lindenplatz
Every 2 years	Forest work championships of Baden-Württemberg	Playground & state machinery yard
In winter (weather-related)	Ice hockey game village youth – voluntary fire brigade	Village pond

=== Natural monuments ===
- Nature reserve Falchen with field of dolines, dry grassland and Falchensee (lake Falchen)
- Sandgrube (sand pit), sand deposits formed by the prehistoric river Urbrenz
- Judenbusch (Jewish bush). The Judenbusch is an extensive natural monument with several old European beeches. The name comes from the Jews who camped and stayed overnight there. From Nördlingen in Bavaria they crossed the Württemberg state border with their cattle, had to pay customs and moved on to the markets. By far the largest tree was colloquially called the "Judenbusch". The storms of the last decades affected the tree more and more. On the morning of 18 May 2020, the last remaining branch broke off due to its own weight. Its age was nearly 300 years, the remaining stump has a circumference of 6.35 m.
- Village pond
- Other ponds, dolines and clay pits
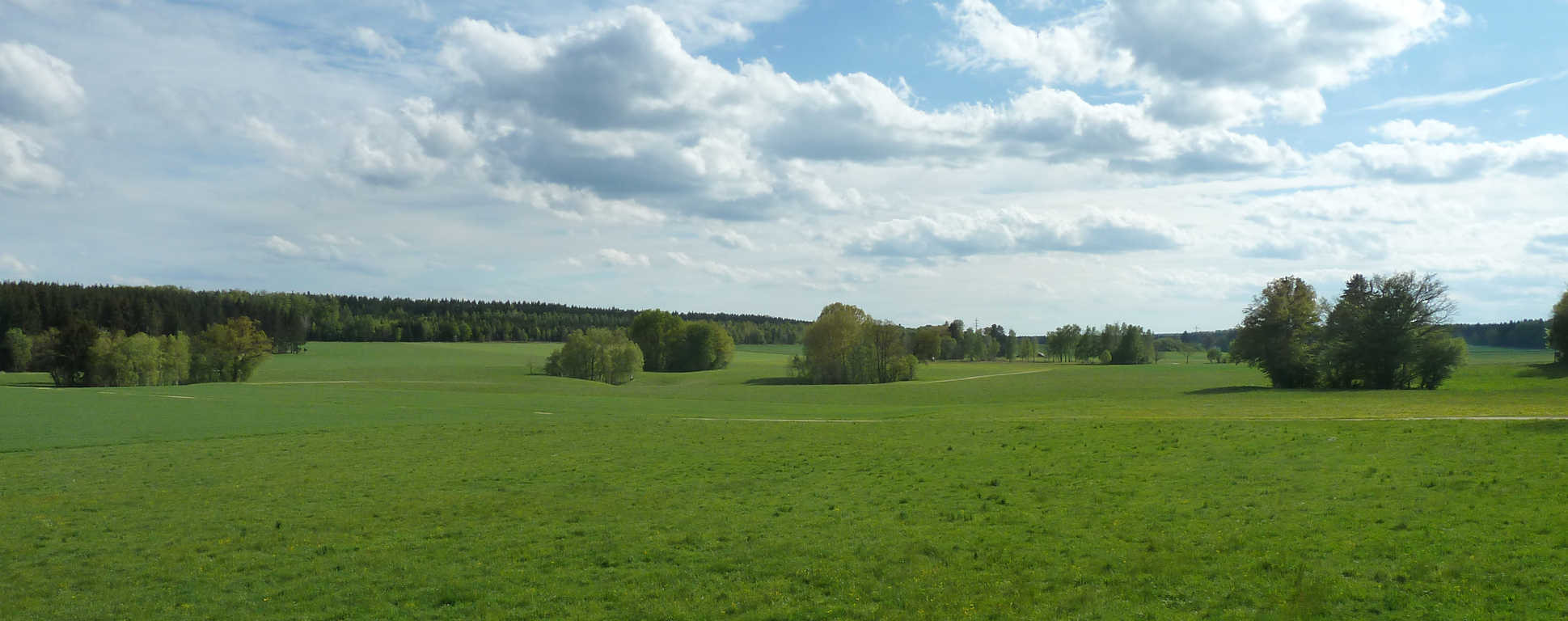
Falchen with field of dolines

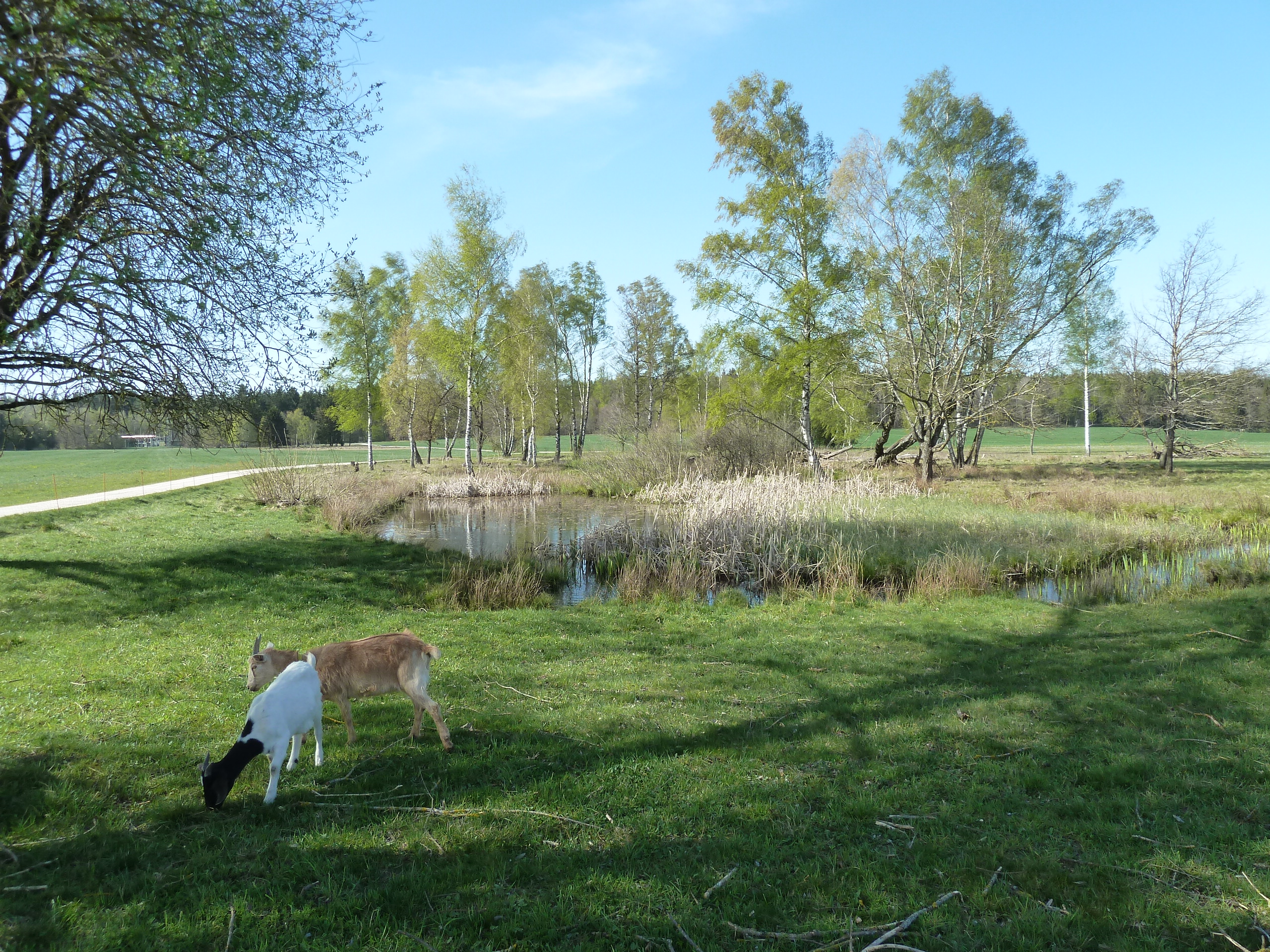
Falchensee

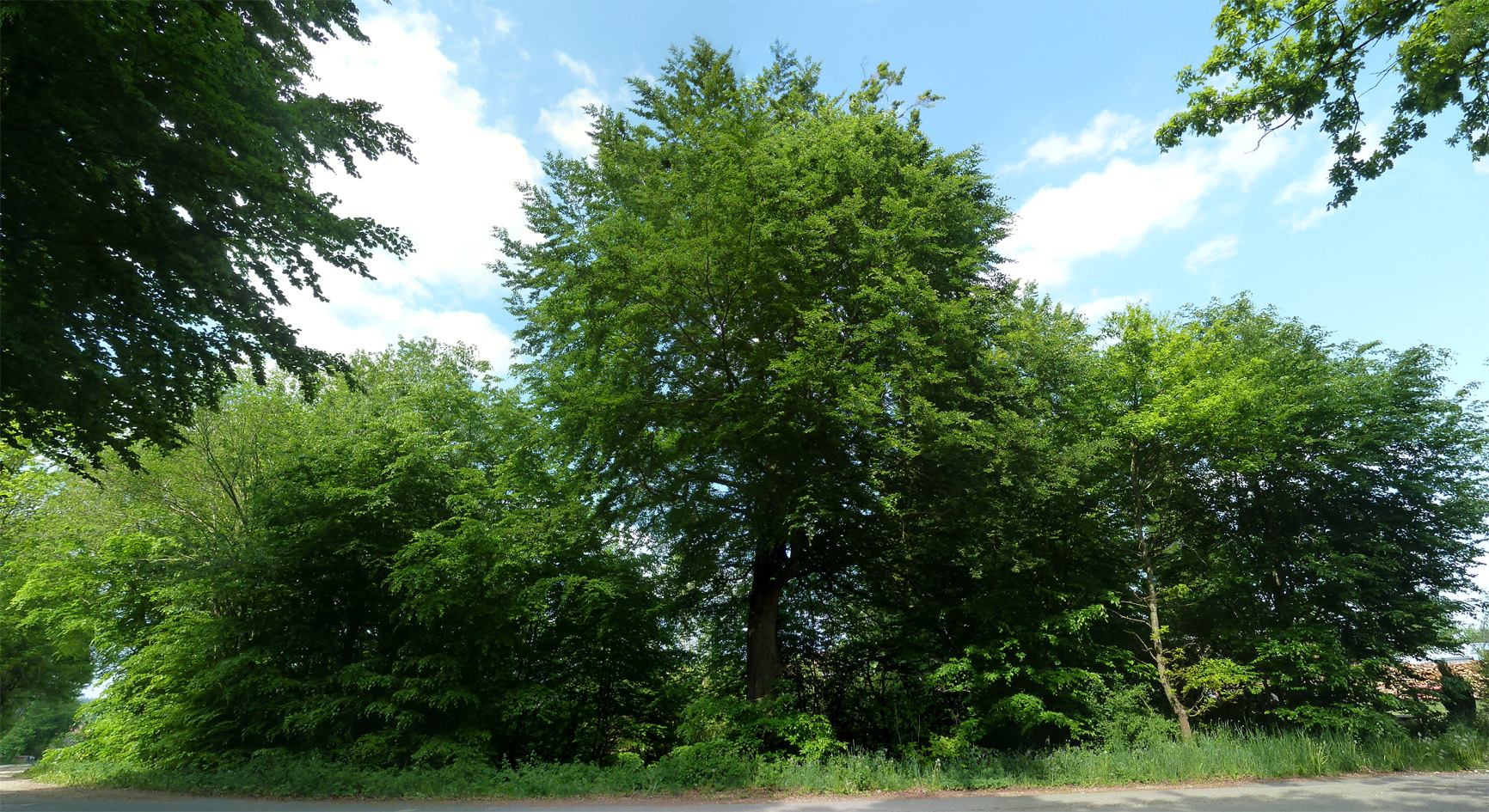
Sandgrube

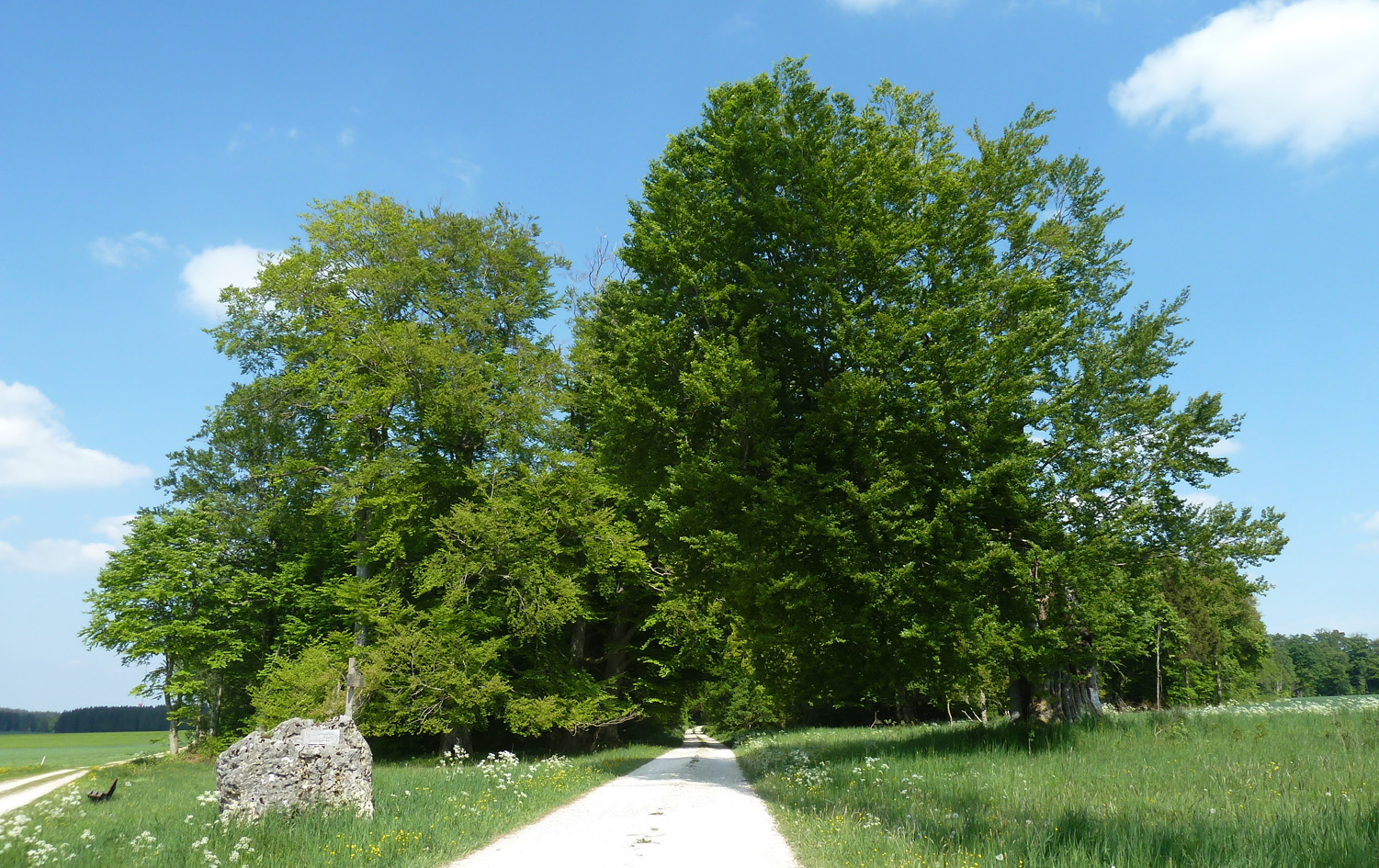
Judenbusch on 16 May 2020 (right the "Judenbusch")

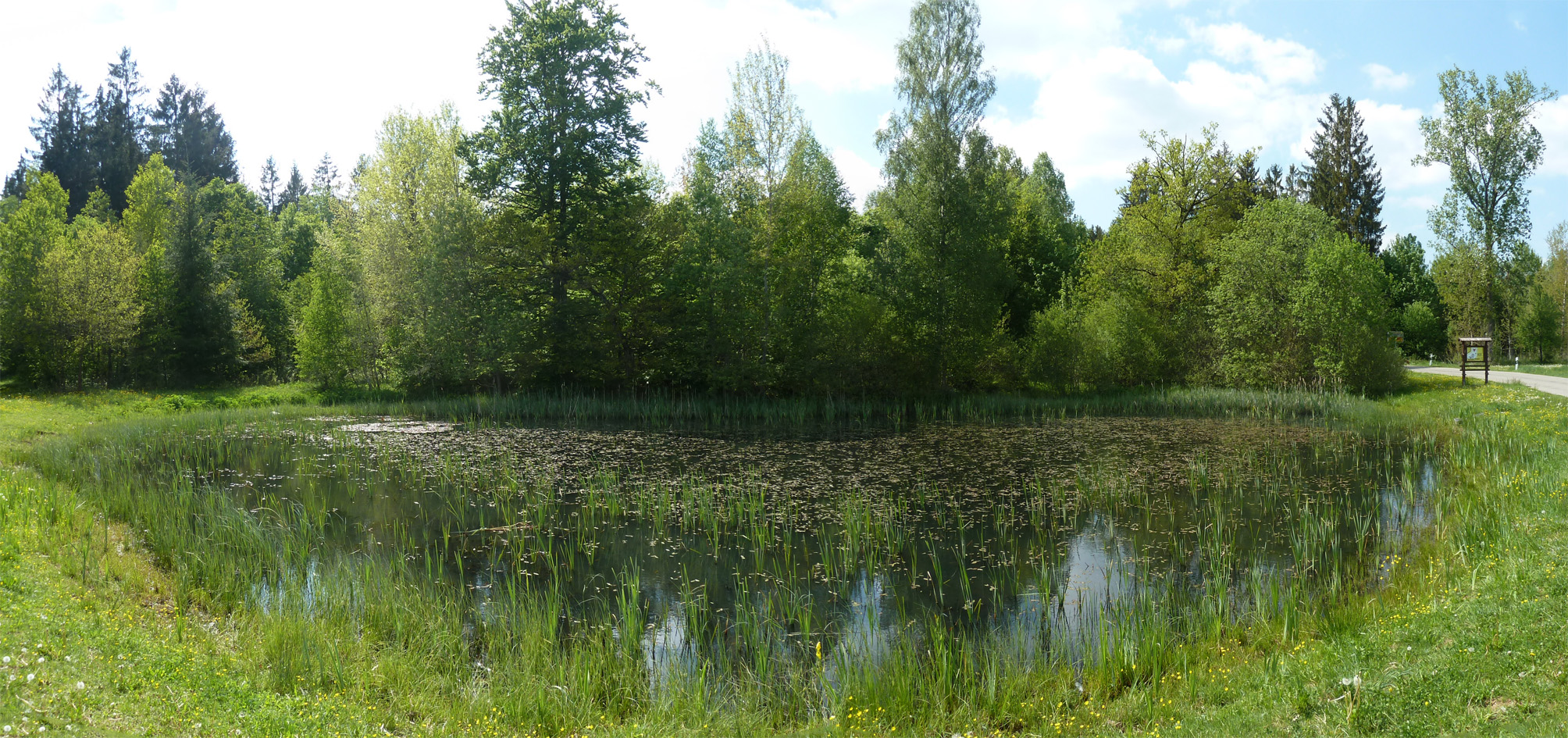
Village pond

== Economy and infrastructure ==
=== Agriculture ===
Despite the fact that the soil is very meager and mostly small farms existed, Ochsenberg was shaped by agriculture from the beginning. The owners were not able to feed themselves and also had a second job. Up to the progress of technology, the children had to do their service as well.

The number of milk suppliers decreased continuously in the course of time. In 1955 there were 29, in 1995 there were 4 and in 2026 only 2.

=== Transport ===
Ochsenberg is connected to the federal road B 19 via the district road K 3011 (Itzelberg) and also the Zahnberger Straße (Königsbronn).

The closest motorway access in 11 km distance is the federal motorway A 7 near Nattheim (junction Heidenheim/116).

The nearest railway station with hourly connections in the direction of Aalen and Heidenheim/Ulm is in Königsbronn (Brenz railway).

There is a basic public bus service through the public transport companies Heidenheimer Tarifverbund (htv) and Süddeutsche Verkehrslinien (SVL).

== Personalities ==
- Hans Bäurle (1931–2024), painter, graphic artist and sculptor
- Jörg Haug (* 1937), professor for local history and subject teaching
- Frank Pudel (* 1977), sports masseur and personality trainer
- Jörg Weiler (* 1981), mayor of Königsbronn

== Literature sources ==
- State manuals of Württemberg/Baden-Württemberg (since 1807)
- Festschriften Liederlust Ochsenberg (1974/1999): 50-/75-jähriges Jubiläum
- Festschriften SSV Ochsenberg (1979/2004): 50-/75-jähriges Jubiläum
- Festschrift of the municipality Königsbronn (1987): 700 Jahre Königsbronn
- Book by Karl Burr (1995): Chronik von Königsbronn, April 1945 – März 1995
- Article of the newspaper Heidenheimer Neue Presse by Karl Burr (27 October 1997): 70 Männer bauten einst die Hauptstrasse
- Book by Ernst Laquai (2002): Ortsfamilienbuch Königsbronn/Württemberg in 400 Jahren
- Chronicle by Roland Schmid (2011): 75 Jahre Freiwillige Feuerwehr Ochsenberg
- Festschrift Protestant parish office Königsbronn (2013): 50 Jahre Johanneskirche Ochsenberg
- Article of the newspaper Heidenheimer Neue Presse by Gerhard Stock (24 April 2014): 40.000 Module für das Solarkraftwerk
- Ortslexikon (dictionary of places) in LEO-BW

(all in German language)
