= Rainbow Coffee House =

London coffee house

Coordinates: 51.5137°N 0.1111°W

The Rainbow Coffee House was a famous coffee house located at 15 Fleet Street, London. It was opened by James Farr in 1657, becoming London's second coffee house.

The Rainbow provided a meeting place for freemasons and French refugee Huguenots who established an information centre there. The Rainbow was also featured in the furore created by Titus Oates, who accused Sir Philip Lloyd of denying the existence of a Popish Plot there, finding witnesses from amongst the coffee drinkers to testify against him

In 1719 John Woodward wrote a satire The Two Sosias: Or, the True Dr. Byfield at the Rainbow Coffee-House, to the Pretender in Jermyn-Street

David Hughson wrote in 1807 that the Rainbow was replaced by Nando's Coffee House in the same building, later in the 17th century.

== Notable people ==
Many notable Huguenots were associated with the Rainbow Coffee House. However, there were also other German and English notable people.

=== French exiles ===
- Paul Colomiès (1638–1692)
- César de Missy (1703–1775)
- John Theophilus Desaguliers (1683 – 1744)
- Pierre des Maizeaux (1673–1745)
- David Durand (1680 – 1763)
- Peter Anthony Motteux (1663 – 1718)
- Michel de La Roche (fl. 1710–1731)
- Voltaire (1694 – 1778)

=== Others ===
- Anthony Collins (1676 – 1729)
- David Hume (1711 – 1776)
- Richard Mead (1673 – 1754)
- Daniel Maichel (1693–1752)
- Thomas Sprat (1635 – 1713)
- John Toland (1670 – 1722)
