= Nando's Coffee House =

Former coffee house in London, England

Coordinates: 51.5137°N 0.1111°W

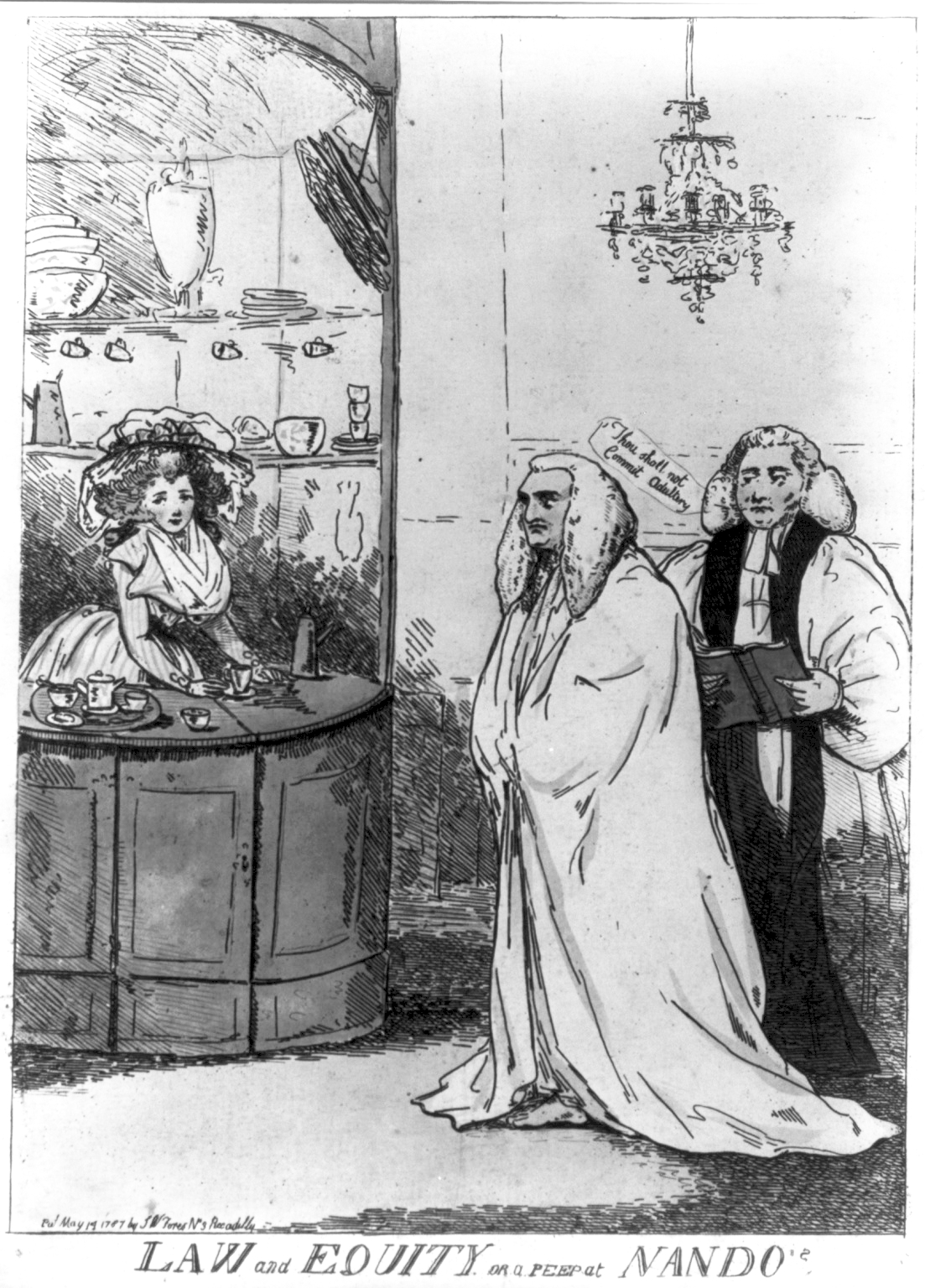
"Law and equity, or A peep at Nando's": a cartoon from 1787, depicting Edward Thurlow in his Chancellor's wig, approaching the bar at Nando's.

Nando's was a coffee house in Fleet Street in London. It was known to exist in 1696, being the subject of a conveyance, and was popular in the 18th century, especially with the legal profession in the nearby courts and chambers.

The name Nando is thought to be a short form of Ferdinando, and its exact address is given variously as somewhere between 15 and 17 Fleet Street. David Hughson wrote in 1807 that Nando's occupied the building at 15 Fleet Street which was previously the Rainbow Coffee House. However, property deeds in the Middle Temple Archive place the location of the coffee house at 14 Fleet Street.

The venue was a favourite haunt of Edward Thurlow, who became Lord Chancellor, and he was satirised as being enamoured of the landlady's attractive daughter.

Charles Lamb refers to Nando's in his essay "Detached Thoughts on Books and Reading", writing, "Newspapers always excite curiosity. No one ever lays one down without a feeling of disappointment. What an eternal time that gentleman in black, at Nando's, keeps the paper! I am sick of hearing the waiter bawling out incessantly, 'The Chronicle is in hand, Sir.'"

== See also ==
- English coffeehouses in the 17th and 18th centuries
