= Königsbronn Abbey =

Coordinates: 48°44′34″N 10°06′49″E

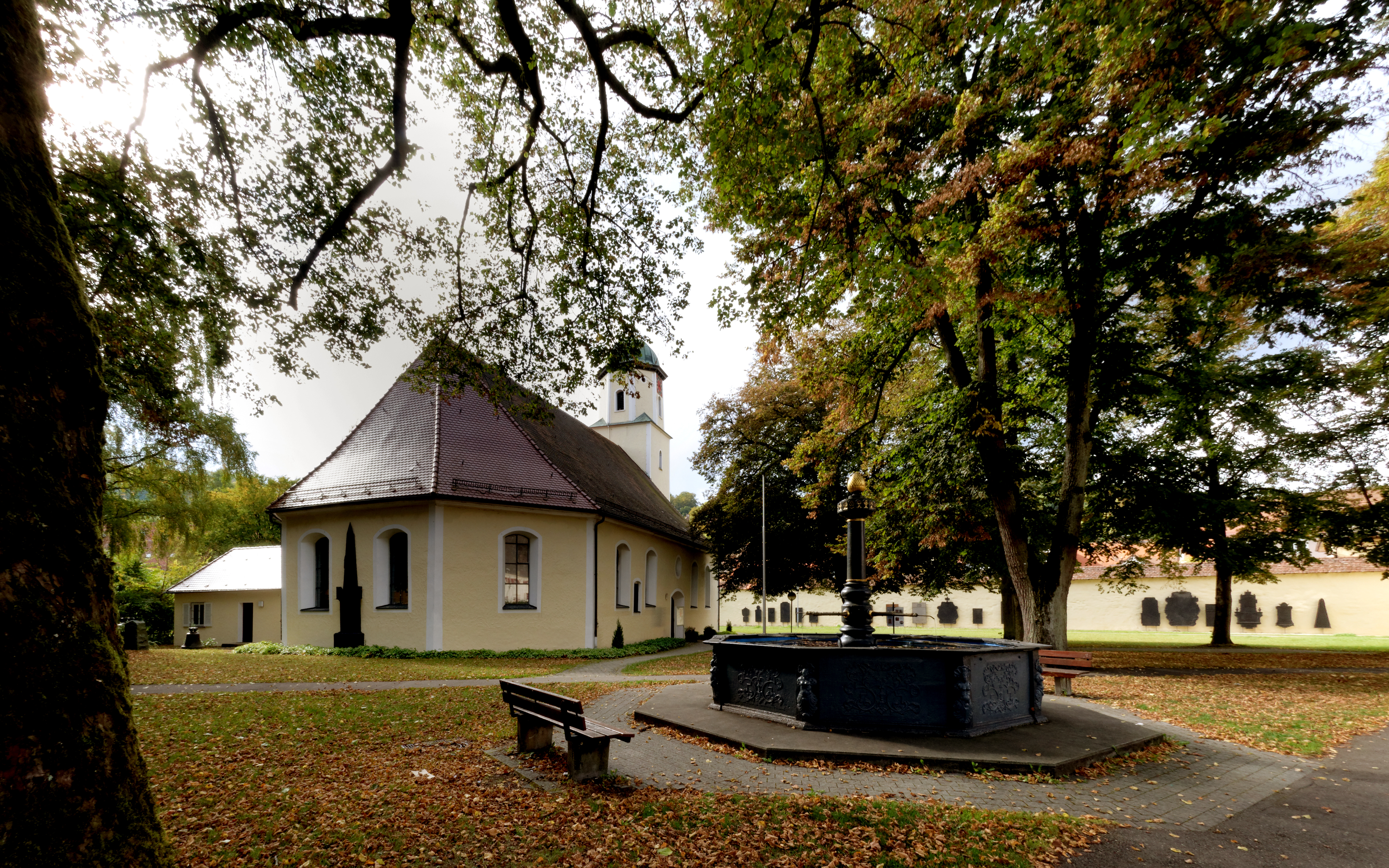
The Monastery complex in Königsbronn

Königsbronn Abbey (Kloster Königsbronn) was a Cistercian monastery in Königsbronn in the district of Heidenheim, Baden-Württemberg, Germany.

== Pre-Reformation ==
The settlement grew up round a castle of the Counts of Dillingen, the Herwartstein, which in the 13th century passed to the Counts of Helfenstein. In 1286 it was besieged by Rudolf of Habsburg, surrendered after two weeks and was demolished.

In 1303, Emperor Albert I founded a Cistercian monastery here, which was settled from Salem Abbey. When the permanent buildings were constructed between 1310 and 1325, most of the stone came from the ruined castle. The new monastery was called Königsbronn, from which the town took its name.

Albert granted it as part of its endowment the advowson of the church of Reutlingen, where the Königsbronner Klosterhof remains to this day; it is now used as the local history museum of Reutlingen.

The whole region was not only strategically situated but was also from an early period a highly productive centre for ore extraction and metal working, which made it unusually valuable. Its possession was therefore keenly sought after, and it was frequently used as a political bargaining counter.

The new monastery was thus, by virtue of its position, caught up from its inception in the political and economic conflicts of the period. Almost immediately after its foundation it was involved in the conflict between Louis of Bavaria and the papacy, in which it sided with the papacy. This then brought it into opposition to the Counter-king and later Emperor Charles IV, whose troops attacked it in 1346. In 1347 Charles not only pardoned it but compensated it for the damage by the gift of the advowson of the church of Pfullendorf.

In 1353 however Charles granted the Vogtei (advocacy, or right of protection) to the Counts of Helfenstein. From then until the early 16th century the abbey was caught up in continuing political disruption between the surrounding states and great families. At various times the monastery or the Vogtei (or both) was given, generally along with Heidenheim, to the Counts of Helfenstein or the rulers of Württemberg or Austria, and different emperors alternately granted it away in exchange for favours or mortgaged it, and then restored it to independence. On a couple of occasions it was given to the city of Ulm. It was put under Imperial protection on several occasions, and at some point during this period was granted Reichsfreiheit as an Imperial abbey in an effort to shield it.

Königsbronn was always a small community, on several occasions during the 15th century so severely reduced and demoralised that it barely survived.

In 1513 Melchior Ruff became abbot of Königsbronn and for the first time in its history was able to put it on a stable financial and political footing. In recognition of his great achievements he was granted the pontificalia by Pope Leo X.

== Reformation and after ==
On the death of Melchior Ruff in 1539 the state of Württemberg attempted to reform the monastery, but the monks were able to resist the attempt. The town of Königsbronn was destroyed in 1552 during the Schmalkaldic War and in the following year the monastery was forcibly Lutheranised; the Roman Catholic monks were expelled.

It was proposed in the Restitution Edict of 1629 that the monastery should revert to being Catholic, which it accordingly was between 1630 and 1632, and again between 1635 and 1648, but the opposition of the population of Königsbronn thwarted both attempts, and the monastery remained a Protestant establishment until it was wound up in 1710.

== Buildings ==
The monastery church and buildings on the bank of the River Brenz still stand. The church contains the monument of Anna Beatrix von Schlüsselburg (d. 1355), wife of Count Ulrich IX of Helfenstein, a great patroness and protector of the abbey.

The former abbey gatehouse is now the Torbogenmuseum, a museum of local history, and also accommodates the Baden-Württemberg State Fishing Museum .

== Brewery ==
The monastery brewery continued after 1710 as a commercial enterprise and is still in production today as the Klosterbrauerei Königsbronn AG.

== Sources ==
- (in German) Gemeinde Königsbronn official website
- (in German) Klöster in Baden-Württemberg: Königsbronn
- (in German) Klosterbrauerei Königsbronn AG
