= Pierre des Maizeaux =

French Huguenot writer (died 1745)

Pierre des Maizeaux, also spelled Desmaizeaux (c. 1666 or 1673 – June 1745), was a French Huguenot writer exiled in London, best known as the translator and biographer of Pierre Bayle.

He was born in Pailhat, Auvergne, France. His father, a minister of the reformed church, had to leave France on the revocation of the Edict of Nantes, and took refuge in Geneva, where Pierre was educated. Pierre Bayle gave him an introduction to Anthony Ashley-Cooper, 3rd Earl of Shaftesbury, with whom, in 1689, he went to England, where he engaged in literary work. He remained in close touch with the religious refugees in England and Holland, and through his involvement with the Huguenot information centre based at the masonic Rainbow Coffee House he was constantly in correspondence with the leading continental savants and writers, who were in the habit of employing him to conduct such business as they might have in England. In 1720 he was elected a fellow of the Royal Society.

He was a colleague of Anthony Collins and edited the writings of John Locke (1720). He was the translator and biographer of Pierre Bayle. One of the key figures in the eighteenth century Republic of Letters and London's Huguenot diaspora. Des Maizeaux also translated the works of Charles de Saint-Évremond in English from the French published in 1714 during his exile in England. The book also described the author's life. The work was dedicated to the Right Honourable Charles Lord Halifax. In 1700 des Maizeaux wrote a remark concerning Leibniz' 'New System' and in 1720 he edited and prefaced a French translation of the Leibniz–Clarke correspondence.

Among his works are also Vie de St Evremond (1711), Vie de Boileau-Despreaux (1712), Vie de Bayle (1730). He also took an active part in preparing the Bibliothèque raisonnée des ouvrages de l'Europe (1728–1753), and the Bibliothèque britannique (1733–1747), and edited a selection of St. Evremond's writings (1706). Part of Des Maiseaux's correspondence is preserved in the British Museum, and other letters are in the Royal Library in Copenhagen.

Des Maizeaux died in London.
