= Königsbronn =

- Municipality
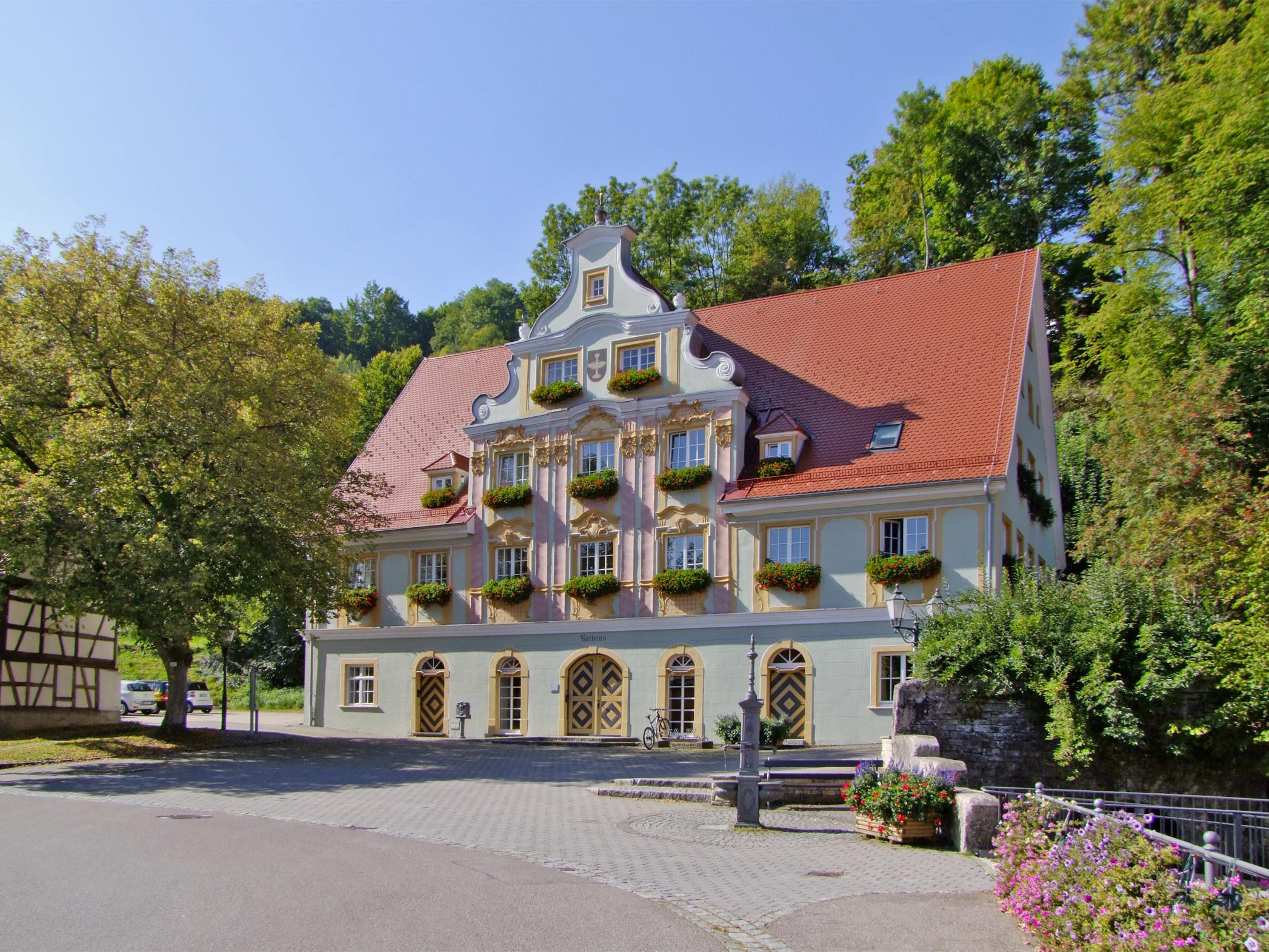
- Town hall

- Coat of arms

- Location of Königsbronn within Heidenheim district
- Interactive map of Königsbronn
- Location within Germany Location within Baden-Württemberg
- Coordinates: 48°44′34″N 10°6′49″E
- Country: Germany
- State: Baden-Württemberg
- Admin. region: Stuttgart
- District: Heidenheim

Government
  - Mayor (2022–30): Jörg Weiler (Ind.)

Area
  - Total: 45.44 km^{2} (17.54 sq mi)
- Elevation: 498 m (1,634 ft)

Population (2025-12-31)
  - Total: 6,966
  - Density: 153.3/km^{2} (397.0/sq mi)
- Time zone: UTC+01:00 (CET)
  - Summer (DST): UTC+02:00 (CEST)
- Postal codes: 89551
- Dialling codes: 07328
- Vehicle registration: HDH
- Website: www.koenigsbronn.de

Königsbronn (German pronunciation: [køːnɪçsˈbʁɔn]) is a municipality in the district of Heidenheim in Baden-Württemberg in southern Germany. Königsbronn (Koenigsbronn) as an administrative community also includes the villages of Itzelberg, Ochsenberg and Zang. It lies in the Brenz valley within the hills of the Swabian Jura, a landscape shaped by karst (limestone). A spring near the town center is the source of the Brenz, a tributary of the Danube.

== Geographical location ==
The Brenz pot Königsbronn lies at the eastern end of the Swabian Jura, the so-called Ostalb. The main town is like the suburb in Itzelberg Brenztal while the higher-lying suburb Zang on the west of the valley Albuch and Ochsenberg lying on the Härtsfeld east of the valley. In Königsbronn springs the Brenz, which opens at Lauingen into the Danube. North of the village on the border with neighboring city Oberkochen runs the European watershed separating the drainage areas towards the Rhine and the North Sea from the drainage area to the Danube and Black Sea. Geologically Königsbronn marked by the karst landscape of the Swabian Alb, on the limestone cliffs and caves and springs in the porous limestone (Jura) are characteristic.

== Municipality arrangement ==
The municipality Königsbronn with the formerly independent municipalities Itzelberg, Ochsenberg and Zang includes eleven villages, hamlets, farms and houses. The municipality area of Königsbronn (31 December 1970) included the courtyards Brenzelhof, Seegartenhof, Stürzelhof, Zahnberg, Ziegelhütte and Birkach and the dialed villages Baumgarten, Spichtsol, Springen, Steinhürn, Utzemannsweiler, Wichartsberge and Herwartstein. To Ochsenberg and Zang then belonged only each the eponymous village, to Zang the dialed villages Kerbenhof, Hermann Weiler and Strut.

== Demographics ==
Population development:

| Year | Inhabitants |
|---|---|
| 1990 | 7,501 |
| 2001 | 7,539 |
| 2011 | 7,050 |
| 2021 | 7,064 |

== History ==
There is some evidence that the area was first populated in the Stone Age.

The foundations of a castle of the early Middle Ages possibly erected around 1000 AD on the site of an even earlier castle, of robber-knights, as it is being told can be found on the rock Herwartstein overlooking the valley, which was allegedly destroyed by the son of the emperor of Holy Roman Empire of medieval Germany.

Below, in the valley, a hamlet called "Springen" was formed.

In 1303, a monastery was founded (and allegedly erected with stones from the destroyed castle) for Cistercian monks. It was to become one of the most influential and wealthiest monasteries in Southern Germany. The place was renamed "Königsbronn" which means "Kings's Spring".

In 1552, the monastery and village that had grown next to it were destroyed and a year later the area became Protestant (Lutheran). When the village was supposed to turn catholic again in 1629, the population rebelled and stayed Protestant.

The monastery had been a centre of pre-industrial-age metallurgy and in 1366 had been granted the right to mine and process iron ore from Emperor Charles IV., only one year after he had given it erroneously to a local count. The monks then started what became later the industrial company with the longest historic tradition in Germany, the Schwäbische Hüttenwerke GmbH. 1651 a furnace was lit and smelting didn't stop until 1908, when it had ceased to be profitable. However, the business was successfully shifted to finished products, especially to calender rolls for the paper industry, which made Königsbronn and SHW famous. Two out of three state of the art calender rolls in modern paper machines worldwide have been poured in the Königsbronn foundry, which today is a part of SHW Casting Technologies GmbH, a group of foundries specialized on heavy and highly precise castings.

The rococo-style (or late baroque) town hall was erected in 1765, and gives a hint of the spirits of the town at the time.

In 1864, Königsbronn got railway access (Brenz Railway). The railway line has been refurbished from 2003 to September 2007 to modern standards.

On 8 November 1939, a bomb placed by Georg Elser, who had spent much of his life in Königsbronn, detonated in Munich and missed its target Hitler only by a few minutes.

== Recent history and present ==
After the war, many some small industrial companies in the wider area had to close, but some grew to become very successful, e.g. Voith in Heidenheim. Others moved in, e.g. Zeiss in the neighbouring town of Oberkochen. Industry has switched from heavy to high-tech and the second sector of the economy remains by far the most important, whereas climate and soil have never made agriculture too attractive in this region.

== Community partnerships ==
Since 1978 there is a partnership with Reißeck in Austria.

== Transport ==
Königsbronn is tethered by the Brenz Railway Aalen-Ulm to the national rail network. Departs every hour of the Regional Express (Crailsheim-) Ellwangen-Aalen-Ulm; additionally operate daily some regional trains and a single InterRegio Express. Some of the trains also stop at the breakpoint Itzelberg.

== Educational institutions ==
The Georg-Elser-school is a primary, secondary and high school with "Primary field offices" in Itzelberg and Zang and Eichhalde primary school. In addition, in Königsbronn the "School of Forestry Königsbronn" [4] is located.

== Leisure and sports facilities ==
The biggest sports club in Königsbronn is the SVH (sports club Herwartstein) 05 Königsbronn. Approximately 1,000 members operate in 9 departments. Since 2005, the football section of the SVH has a lawn and an artificial pitch. The Tennis Club Königsbronn is located in the district Waldsiedlung and operates during the summer season eight clay courts and a clubhouse hosted. In winter, two indoor courts are available. With favorable snow conditions of the district Zang invites his Zanger trail a cross-country skiing. The ski club (SCK) also operates the Weikersberg ski lift, including a ski school. There is also a cross-country floodlit begins. In addition, the club has a ski jump facility above the town hall.

== Concerts ==
Every year on Memorial Day the school chapel of the Musikverein Königsbronn plays their annual concert. The concert takes place alternately in the church, the Marienkirche and the Hammerschmiede instead.

== Theater ==
Every summer the theater recorded playgroup Königsbronn the Freilichtbühne am Brenz origin on the Rathausvorplatz.

== Museums ==
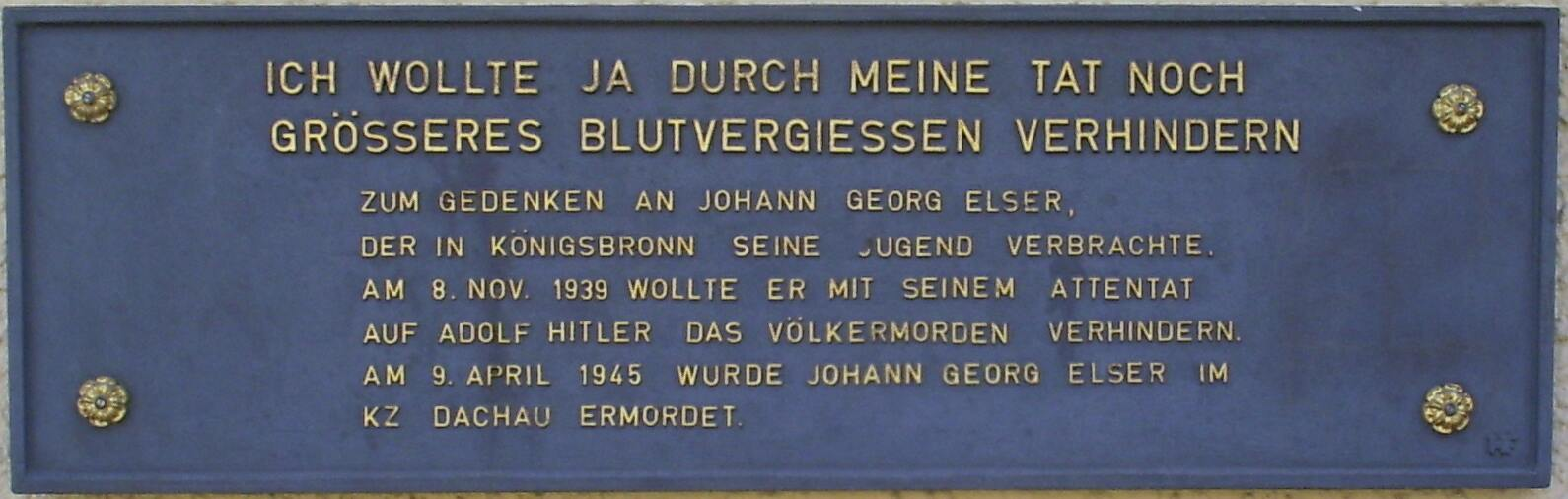
Memorial plaque at the Georg Elser museum

- Torbogenmuseum
- Georg Elser Memorial / Museum

== Buildings ==
- Georg Elser memorial
- The town hall was built in 1765 in the Rococo style.

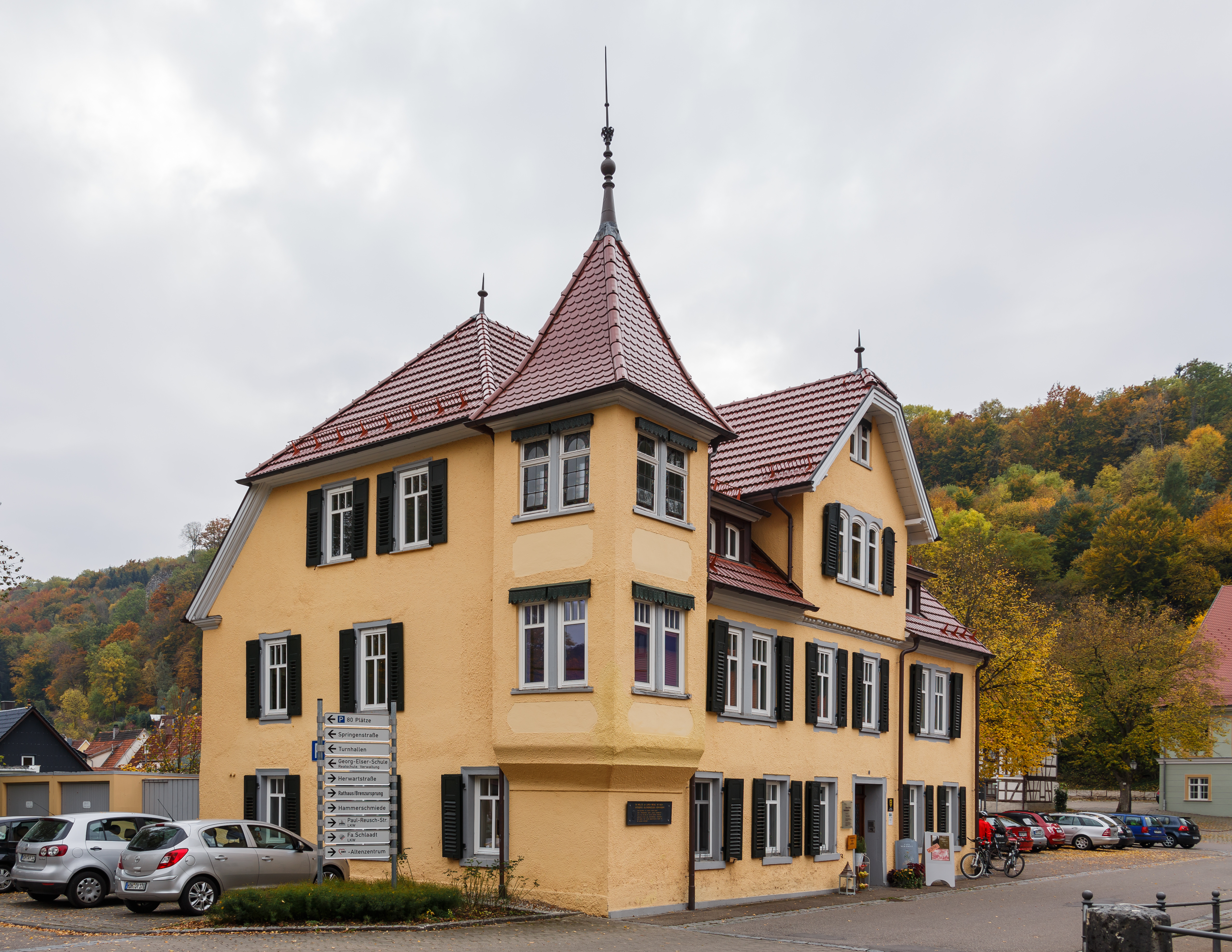
Georg Elser Museum

- An interesting industrial monument is the former, designed by Johann Georg Blezinger Hammerschmiede on Brenz origin (now a small hydroelectric power plant).
- A memorial recalls the Königsbronn Georg Elser and his failed assassination attempt on Adolf Hitler on 8 November 1939. 2010 has been revealed at the station a Georg-Elser statue.
- Monastery Königsbronn: Some buildings of the former 1553 resolved Cistercian monastery are still preserved, including the abbey church, which, however, instead of the destroyed original church only from the year 1565 comes and today is the Protestant parish church.

== Sons and daughters of the town ==
- Johann Georg Blezinger (1717–1795), restaurateur and entrepreneur
- Gottlieb Benjamin Wolf (1780-unknown), Württemberg Oberamtmann
- Karl von Cleß (1794–1874), theologian, classical scholar
- Paul Reusch (1868–1956), industrialist

== Other personalities ==
- Georg Elser (1903–1945), resistance fighter/Hitler assassin, went here to school and worked there as a carpenter.
- Otto Neubrand (born 1911 in Herbrechtingen, died 1975 in Königsbronn), painter, lived and worked in Königsbronn.
- Daniel Maichel (1693–1752), abbot of Königsbronn.
