= Brenz (river) =

River in Germany

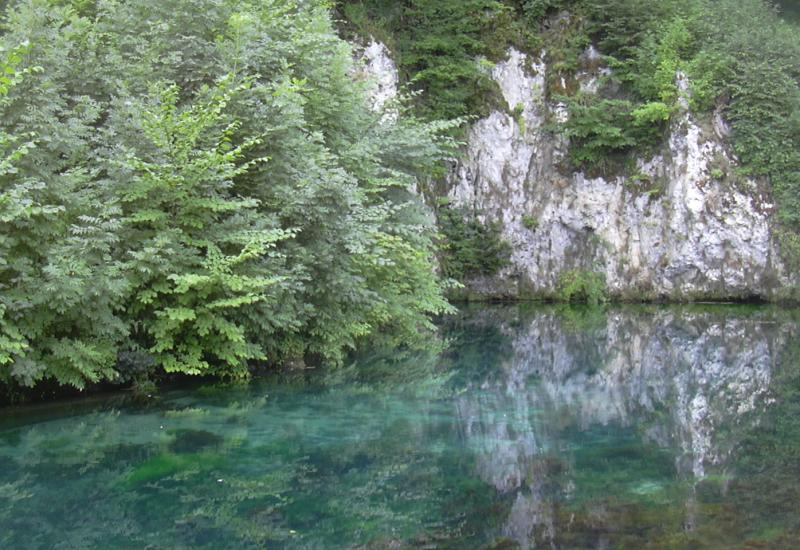
- The source of the Brenz

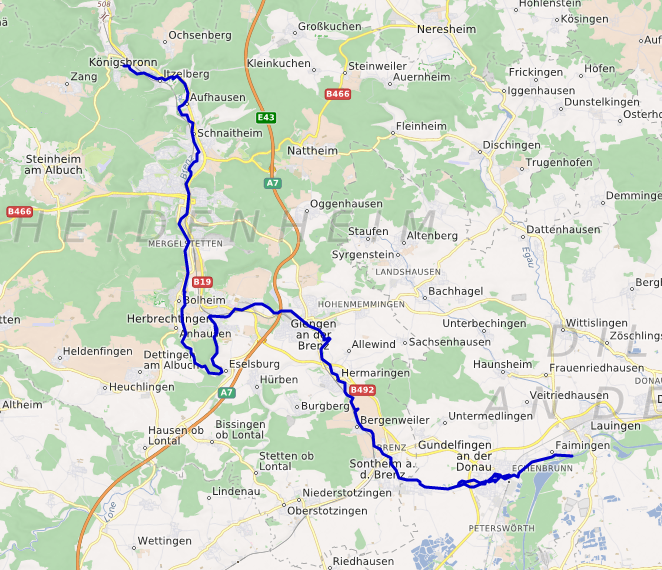

Location
- Country: Germany

Physical characteristics
- Source
  - location: Swabian Alb
- Mouth
  - location: Danube
  - coordinates: 48°33′38″N 10°25′13″E
- Length: 51.6 km (32.1 mi)
- Basin size: 876 km^{2} (338 sq mi)

Basin features
- Progression: Danube→ Black Sea

The Brenz (German pronunciation: [bʁɛnts]) is a river in Baden-Württemberg and Bavaria, Germany. It is a left tributary of the Danube. Its source is at a spring in the town of Königsbronn and it flows for 52 kilometers before meeting the Danube at Lauingen, a few kilometers west of Dillingen. It flows through the towns of Königsbronn, Heidenheim an der Brenz, Giengen and Lauingen.

== See also ==
- List of rivers of Baden-Württemberg
- List of rivers of Bavaria
